= List of Nature Research journals =

This is a list of journals published by Nature Research. These include the flagship Nature journal, the Nature Reviews series (which absorbed the former Nature Clinical Practice series in 2009), the npj series, Scientific Reports and many others.

== List ==
=== A ===
- Acta Pharmacologica Sinica

=== B ===
- BDJ In Practice
- BDJ Open
- BDJ Student
- BDJ Team
- Bioentrepreneur
- Blood Cancer Journal
- Bone Marrow Transplantation
- Bone Research
- British Dental Journal
- British Journal of Cancer

=== C ===
- Cancer Gene Therapy
- Cell Death & Disease
- Cell Death & Differentiation
- Cell Death Discovery
- Cell Discovery
- Cell Research
- Cellular & Molecular Immunology
- Communications Biology
- Communications Chemistry
- Communications Earth & Environment
- Communications Engineering
- Communications Materials
- Communications Medicine
- Communications Physics
- Communications Psychology

=== E ===
- European Journal of Clinical Nutrition
- European Journal of Human Genetics
- Evidence-Based Dentistry
- Experimental & Molecular Medicine
- Eye

=== G ===
- Gene Therapy
- Genes & Immunity
- Genetics in Medicine

=== H ===
- Heredity
- Human Genome Variation
- Humanities and Social Sciences Communications
- Hypertension Research

=== I ===
- International Journal of Impotence Research
- International Journal of Obesity
- International Journal of Obesity Supplements
- International Journal of Oral Science
- ISME Communications
- The ISME Journal

=== J ===
- The Journal of Antibiotics
- Journal of Exposure Science and Environmental Epidemiology
- Journal of Human Genetics
- Journal of Human Hypertension
- Journal of Perinatology

=== L ===
- Lab Animal
- Laboratory Investigation
- Leukemia
- Leukemia Supplements
- Light: Science & Applications

=== M ===
- Microsystems & Nanoengineering
- Modern Pathology
- Molecular Psychiatry
- Mucosal Immunology

=== N ===
- Nature
- Nature Africa
- Nature Aging
- Nature Astronomy
- Nature Biomedical Engineering
- Nature Biotechnology
- Nature Cancer
- Nature Cardiovascular Research
- Nature Catalysis
- Nature Cell Biology
- Nature Chemical Biology
- Nature Chemistry
- Nature Climate Change
- Nature Communications
- Nature Computational Science
- Nature Digest
- Nature Ecology & Evolution
- Nature Electronics
- Nature Energy
- Nature Food
- Nature Genetics
- Nature Geoscience
- Nature Human Behaviour
- Nature Immunology
- Nature India
- Nature Italy
- Nature Machine Intelligence
- Nature Materials
- Nature Medicine
- Nature Mental Health
- Nature Metabolism
- Nature Methods
- Nature Microbiology
- Nature Nanotechnology
- Nature Neuroscience
- Nature Photonics
- Nature Physics
- Nature Plants
- Nature Protocols
- Nature Structural & Molecular Biology
- Nature Sustainability
- Nature Synthesis
- Nature Water
- Neuropsychopharmacology
- NPG Asia Materials
- Nutrition & Diabetes

=== O ===
- Oncogene
- Oncogenesis

=== P ===
- Palgrave Communications
- Pediatric Research
- The Pharmacogenomics Journal
- Polymer Journal
- Prostate Cancer and Prostatic Diseases

=== S ===
- Scientific American
- Scientific American Mind
- Scientific Data
- Scientific Reports
- Signal Transduction and Targeted Therapy
- Spinal Cord
- Spinal Cord Series and Cases

=== T ===
- Translational Psychiatry

== Special series ==
=== Nature Reviews series ===
Nature Reviews is a series of review journals.

- Nature Reviews Cancer
- Nature Reviews Cardiology
- Nature Reviews Chemistry
- Nature Reviews Clinical Oncology
- Nature Reviews Disease Primers
- Nature Reviews Drug Discovery
- Nature Reviews Earth & Environment
- Nature Reviews Endocrinology
- Nature Reviews Gastroenterology & Hepatology
- Nature Reviews Genetics
- Nature Reviews Immunology
- Nature Reviews Materials
- Nature Reviews Methods Primers
- Nature Reviews Microbiology
- Nature Reviews Molecular Cell Biology
- Nature Reviews Nephrology
- Nature Reviews Neurology
- Nature Reviews Neuroscience
- Nature Reviews Physics
- Nature Reviews Psychology
- Nature Reviews Rheumatology
- Nature Reviews Urology

=== npj series ===
The Nature Partner Journals series, abbreviated npj (lowercase), is a series of online-only, open access, journals. It was launched in April 2014 with three journals: npj Primary Care Respiratory Medicine, npj Biofilms and Microbiomes, and npj Schizophrenia. Each journal in the series is published through a partnership between Springer Nature and a separate academic organization, foundation, or institution.

- npj 2D Materials and Applications
- npj Aging (formerly npj Aging and Mechanisms of Disease)
- npj Biodiversity
- npj Biofilms and Microbiomes
- npj Biological Timing and Sleep
- npj Breast Cancer
- npj Clean Water
- npj Climate and Atmospheric Science
- npj Computational Materials
- npj Digital Medicine
- npj Flexible Electronics
- npj Genomic Medicine
- npj Imaging
- npj Materials Degradation
- npj Mental Health Research
- npj Microgravity
- npj Nanophotonics
- npj Natural Hazards
- npj Ocean Sustainability
- npj Parkinson's Disease
- npj Precision Oncology
- npj Primary Care Respiratory Medicine
- npj Quantum Information
- npj Quantum Materials
- npj Regenerative Medicine
- npj Schizophrenia
- npj Science of Food
- npj Science of Learning
- npj Systems Biology and Applications
- npj Vaccines
- npj Wireless Technology
- npj Urban Sustainability

== See also ==
- Lists of academic journals
