= NSMB =

NSMB may refer to:

- NSMB (mathematics), a Navier-Stokes finite volume solver
- Nature Structural & Molecular Biology, an academic journal
- New Super Mario Bros. (series), a series of 2D platform games by Nintendo consisting of new revivals of classic Mario platformers
  - New Super Mario Bros., the first game in the series, released in 2006 for the Nintendo DS
- nsmb(4), Server Message Block implementation on [FreeBSD and other BSD systems including macOS
