= Ruth March =

British genomic scientist

Ruth Eleanor March OBE FMedSci
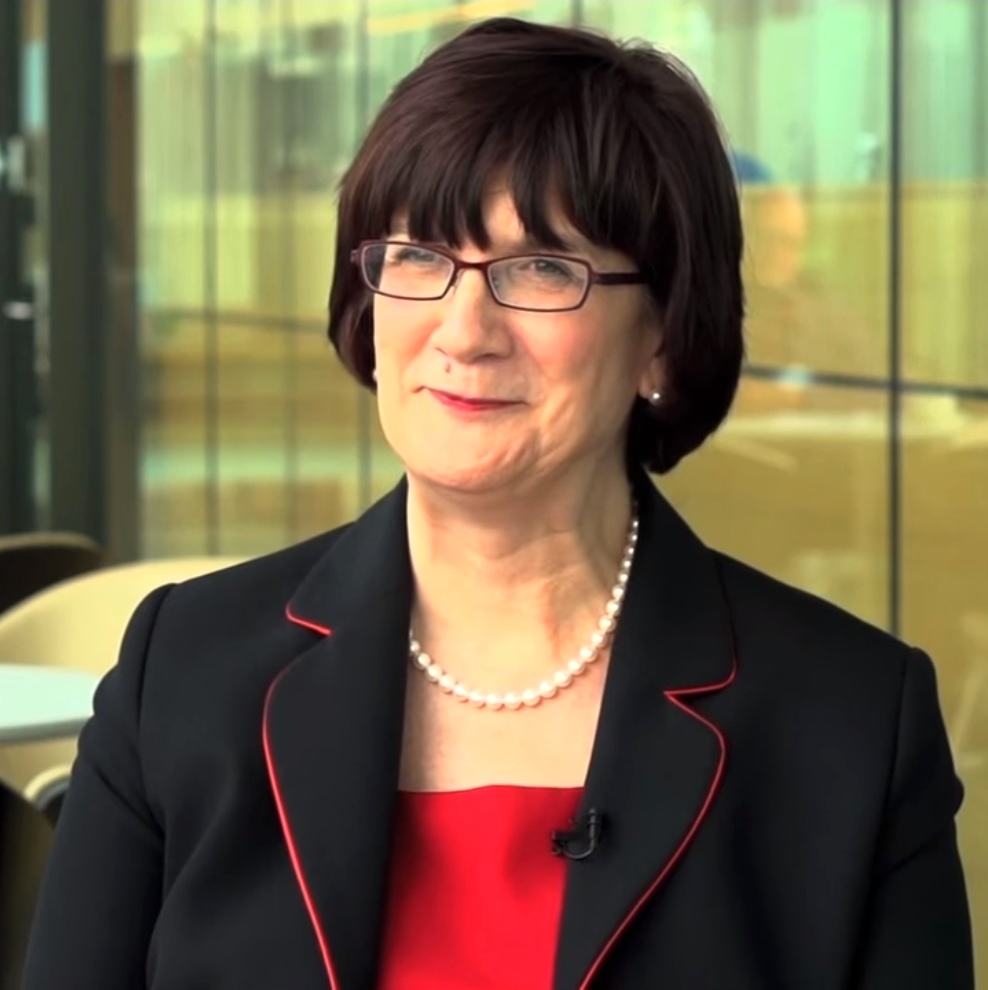
- March interviewed by Pharmaphorum in 2013
- Education: University of London
- Scientific career
- Workplaces: Brunel University London; University of Oxford; AstraZeneca
- Thesis: Properties of normal and rheumatoid antiglobulins : implications for the pathogenesis of rheumatoid arthritis (1983)

Ruth Eleanor March OBE FMedSci is a British genomic scientist who was senior vice president of precision medicine at AstraZeneca from 2019 to 2026. She specialises in precision medicine and oncology. During the COVID-19 pandemic, March developed a diagnostic test for COVID-19.

== Early life and education ==
March started her scientific career at the London Hospital Medical College. She was a graduate student at the University of London, where she studied immunology. In particular, she studied the properties of rheumatoid anti globulins and their role in the pathogenesis of rheumatoid arthritis.

After earning her doctorate, she joined the Medical Research Council Immunochemistry Unit at the University of Oxford, where she trained in genomic science and gene mapping. Her research contributed to the first genome-wide single-nucleotide polymorphism analysis of a biomarker to be submitted to the Food and Drug Administration. In 1997, she moved to Brunel University London, where she spent a year as a university lecturer.

== Research and career ==
In 1998, March joined AstraZeneca as a principal scientist in pharmacogenomics. She initiated the AstraZeneca genomics initiative, and became interested in personalised healthcare. She argued that this approach would lead to more predictable outcomes for patients. She worked on the expansion of precision medicine AstraZeneca, which now accounts for over ninety per cent of AstraZeneca's effort in clinical therapeutics. These efforts have transformed the drug development process. Before AstraZeneca starts clinical trials, March investigates biomarkers for particular drugs. These biomarkers can then be used to select patients for clinical trials.

March is part of the AstraZeneca research and development team for oncology. She is also interested in innovations in diagnostics, and has developed several industry firsts in the diagnosis of inflammation and BRCA mutations.

In 2014, March partnered with Roche and Qiagen to create tests based on circulating tumor DNA (ctDNA). These tests can isolate specific signals from the background of DNA noise. They can be used to identify small quantities of the tumour DNA when it is circulating in the blood of cancer patients. She was elected Fellow of the Academy of Medical Sciences in 2019. In 2021, she announced a partnership with Thermo Fisher Scientific to develop next-generation sequencing-based companion diagnostics.

In the early days of the COVID-19 pandemic, March started working on a diagnostic test for COVID-19. She was appointed Officer of the Order of the British Empire (OBE) in the 2022 New Year Honours for services to UK science and the Covid-19 response.

== Selected publications ==
- David Cook; Dearg Brown; Robert Alexander; Ruth March; Paul Morgan; Gemma Satterthwaite; Menelas N. Pangalos (16 May 2014). "Lessons learned from the fate of AstraZeneca's drug pipeline: a five-dimensional framework" (PDF). Nature Reviews Drug Discovery. 13 (6): 419–431. doi:10.1038/nrd4309. ISSN 1474-1776. PMID 24833294. Wikidata Q38212169.
- Edmund Lee; Stephen Ryan; Bruce Birmingham; et al. (1 October 2005). "Rosuvastatin pharmacokinetics and pharmacogenetics in white and Asian subjects residing in the same environment". Clinical Pharmacology & Therapeutics. 78 (4): 330–341. doi:10.1016/j.clpt.2005.06.013. ISSN 0009-9236. PMID 16198652. Wikidata Q34561428.
- Kindmark A; Jawaid A; Harbron CG; et al. (15 May 2007). "Genome-wide pharmacogenetic investigation of a hepatic adverse event without clinical signs of immunopathology suggests an underlying immune pathogenesis". The Pharmacogenomics Journal. 8 (3): 186–195. doi:10.1038/sj.tpj.6500458. ISSN 1470-269X. PMID 17505501. Wikidata Q61781514.
