= Nature Reviews Chemistry =

- Discipline: Chemistry
- Language: English
- Edited by: Stephen Davey

Publication details
- History: 2017–present
- Publisher: Nature Portfolio
- Frequency: Monthly
- Impact factor: 51.7 (2024)

Standard abbreviations
- ISO 4: Nat. Rev. Chem.

Indexing
- CODEN: NRCAF7
- ISSN: 2397-3358
- LCCN: 2020204269
- OCLC no.: 979416438

Links
- Journal homepage; Online archive

Nature Reviews Chemistry is monthly online-only peer-reviewed scientific journal published by Nature Portfolio. It was established in 2017. The journal contains reviews, perspectives and comments in all disciplines within chemistry. The editorial team consists of Stephen Davey who is the editor-in-chief, Stephanie Greed, and Alexander Rosu-Finsen.

== Abstracting and indexing ==
The journal is abstracted and indexed in:

- Science Citation Index Expanded
- Scopus
- Medline

According to the Journal Citation Reports, the journal has a 2024 impact factor of 51.7, ranking it 2nd out of 230 journals in the category "Chemistry, Multidisciplinary".
