= Nature Protocols =

- Language: English
- Edited by: Melanie Clyne

Publication details
- History: 2006–present
- Publisher: Nature Publishing Group
- Impact factor: 18.4 (2025)

Standard abbreviations
- ISO 4: Nat. Protoc.

Indexing
- ISSN: 1754-2189 (print); 1750-2799 (web)

Links
- Journal homepage

Nature Protocols, published by the Nature Publishing Group, is an on-line scientific journal publishing methods in a recipe-style format. The journal was launched in June 2006 and the content includes both classical methods and cutting-edge techniques relevant to the study of biological problems. The content on this site is divided into "Nature Protocols" and the "Protocol Exchange".

Initially, all "Nature Protocols" were commissioned by editors, but it is now possible for authors to upload pre-submission enquiries. All Nature Protocols are peer-reviewed, fully edited and styled prior to publication. New protocols are added to the site on a weekly basis.

== Published protocols ==
Published protocols are sorted into the following categories:

- Biochemistry
- Cell and tissue culture
- Cell biology and developmental biology (includes detection of apoptosis and others)
- Computational biology and theoretical biology (includes bioinformatics)
- Genetic analysis (includes classical genetics, reverse genetics, mutation detection and others)
- Genetic modification (includes transgenes, transfection, transformation (genetics) and other gene delivery techniques)
- Genomics and proteomics (includes microarrays and others)
- Imaging (includes microscopy, MRI, SPECT and PET)
- Immunological techniques
- Isolation and Purification (includes cell fractionation and others)
- Microbiology and virology
- Molecular biology (includes PCR, cloning, Southern blot and other DNA and RNA based techniques)
- Model organisms (includes Drosophila, C. elegans, Xenopus, zebrafish, mouse, Arabidopsis, Aspergillus, Dictyostelium and others )
- Neuroscience
- Pharmacology and toxicology
- Plant biology
- Spectroscopy and structural analysis (includes protein mass spectrometry and nuclear magnetic resonance)
- Synthetic chemistry, chemical modifications, nanotechnology

== Participation ==
Scientists can participate directly in the Protocol Exchange section of this site. The Protocol Exchange replaced the Protocols Network in December 2010; all content from the Protocols Network was transferred to the Exchange. It is an open-access, online resource that allows researchers to share their detailed experimental know-how. All uploaded protocols are made freely available, assigned DOIs for ease of citation and fully searchable through nature.com. These protocols are not further styled, peer-reviewed or copy edited, but posted live soon after submission. Protocols can be linked to any publications in which they are used. Each Lab Group can establish a dedicated page to collect their lab Protocols. By uploading Protocols to Protocol Exchange, scientists can enable other researchers to more readily reproduce or adapt the methodology they use, as well as increasing the visibility of their protocols and papers.

== See also ==
- Nature
- Protocol (natural sciences)
