= Jeffrey V. Lazarus =

Jeffrey V. Lazarus (born 1969) is a professor of global health at the CUNY Graduate School of Public Health and Health Policy and head of the Public Health Liver Group at the Barcelona Institute for Global Health in Barcelona.

His work focuses on global health policy, viral hepatitis, and steatotic liver disease, and he has been interviewed in international media on public health issues.

== Early life and education ==
Lazarus earned a Bachelor of Arts in Latin American Studies and Romance Languages from New York University, a Master of Arts in Latin American Studies from Georgetown University, and a Master of International Health from the University of Copenhagen. He received a PhD in public health from Lund University.

== Career ==
Lazarus has held positions in international health organizations, including the World Health Organization Regional Office for Europe and the Global Fund to Fight AIDS, Tuberculosis and Malaria.

He contributed to the establishment of a WHO Collaborating Centre on HIV and Viral Hepatitis at the University of Copenhagen and co-founded Health Systems Global.

He chaired the Healthy Livers, Healthy Lives initiative and serves as director of the Global Think-Tank on Steatotic Liver Disease.

The Global Think-Tank on Steatotic Liver Disease has convened international experts and produced policy recommendations published in The Lancet Regional Health - Europe.

He has also collaborated with clinical and research institutions and participated in public health initiatives on steatotic liver disease, including the MASH Cities initiative with the Mount Sinai Health System and expert debates organized by the Fundación ”la Caixa”.

== Research and impact ==
Lazarus's research focuses on global health policy, viral hepatitis, and liver disease prevention, with an emphasis on public health approaches to diagnosis, treatment, and care.

He was a co-author of a consensus statement on non-alcoholic fatty liver disease (NAFLD) published in Nature Reviews Gastroenterology & Hepatology.

He was also a co-author of a Commission on viral hepatitis elimination published in The Lancet Gastroenterology & Hepatology.

His work has also contributed to international efforts on viral hepatitis elimination, including policy discussions associated with the World Health Organization.

Research on fatty liver disease and metabolic dysfunction–associated steatotic liver disease (MASLD) has been widely covered in international media.

He has authored or co-authored hundreds of peer-reviewed publications.

== Awards and honors ==
- Distinguished Scientific Achievement Award, American Liver Foundation (2023)
- Eugene T. Davidson Public Service Award, American Association of Clinical Endocrinology (2025)
