= John Beard (professor) =

Australian physician (born 1955)

John Beard (born 1955) is an academic and health professional known for his work in the fields of healthy ageing and longevity. He previously served as the Director of the Department of Ageing and Life Course at the World Health Organisation, Geneva (2009 - 2018), where he was lead author and editor of the World Report on Ageing and Health and the Global Strategy and Action Plan on Ageing and Health. He is currently Irene Diamond Professor and Director International Longevity Center USA at Columbia University Mailman School of Public Health. His research focuses on the concept of intrinsic capacity as a measure of healthy ageing and in 2026 he received the ICFSR Jeremy Walston Lifetime Achievement Award for this work.

== Early life ==
Beard graduated with a Bachelor of Medicine and Bachelor of Surgery from the University of Adelaide in 1979, and began his career in clinical medicine before moving into public health.

== Career ==
In 2000, he coordinated the public health response as Manager of Public Health for the Sydney Olympic Games.

In 2006, Beard worked as Senior Advisor on Academic Affairs and Senior Epidemiologist at the New York Academy of Medicine. He was appointed as WHO Director of Ageing and Life Course in 2009. During this time he helped launch the Global Network for Age-friendly Cities and Communities, which included New York City as its first participant.

Beard's research advocates for healthy ageing and emphasises understanding health through functional capabilities, or intrinsic capacity, rather than merely the presence or absence of disease. He recently led a longitudinal study that was published in Nature Aging, which found that older adults in England and China today show markedly improved physical and mental functioning compared with earlier generations at similar ages — for example, an English person born in 1950 showed higher intrinsic capacity at age 68 than someone born in 1940 did at age 62.

In 2026, Beard received the ICFSR Jeremy Walston Lifetime Achievement Award for his "contribution in the area of understanding the concept of intrinsic capacity and developing the Integrated Care for Older People program".

== Healthy ageing ==
Beard was the lead author and editor for the World report on ageing and health, published by WHO in 2015, which underpins the 2021–2030 UN Decade of Healthy Ageing. He was also lead editor of the Global Strategy and Action Plan on Ageing and Health. adopted by World Health Organization member states in May 2016 to coordinate global action on ageing. Beard's intrinsic capacity framework has attracted both endorsement and critical scrutiny. Some have described the concept as giving clinicians a way to identify and track the underlying drivers of functional ability in later life, while also cautioning that the care interventions built around it under the WHO's Integrated Care for Older People programme had not yet been rigorously tested for effectiveness.
