= Nature Reviews Nephrology =

- Discipline: Nephrology
- Language: English
- Edited by: Susan Allison

Publication details
- History: 2005–present
- Publisher: Nature Portfolio
- Frequency: Monthly
- Impact factor: 42.439 (2021)

Standard abbreviations
- ISO 4: Nat. Rev. Nephrol.

Indexing
- CODEN: NRNABO
- ISSN: 1759-5061 (print); 1759-507X (web)
- OCLC no.: 370683352

Links
- Journal homepage; Online archive

Nature Reviews Nephrology is a monthly peer-reviewed review journal published by Nature Portfolio. It was established as Nature Clinical Practice Nephrology in 2005, but change name in 2009. The editor-in-chief is Susan Allison.

Coverage includes prevention, diagnosis, and treatment of disorders of the kidney in the adult and child, including hypertension, infection/inflammation, dialysis/chronic uremia, renal failure, transplantation, applied physiology, epidemiology, pathology, immunology, cancer, and genetics.

== Abstracting and indexing ==
The journal is abstracted and indexed in:

- PubMed/MEDLINE
- Science Citation Index Expanded
- Scopus

According to the Journal Citation Reports, the journal has a 2021 impact factor of 42.439, ranking it 1st out of 90 journals in the category "Urology & Nephrology".
