= Nature Electronics =

- Discipline: Electronics
- Language: English
- Edited by: Owain Vaughan

Publication details
- History: 2018–present
- Publisher: Nature Portfolio
- Frequency: Monthly
- Open access: Hybrid
- Impact factor: 34.3 (2022)

Standard abbreviations
- ISO 4: Nat. Electron.

Indexing
- ISSN: 2520-1131
- LCCN: 2018229712
- OCLC no.: 1020171475

Links
- Journal homepage; Online archive

Nature Electronics is a monthly peer-reviewed scientific journal published by Nature Portfolio. It was established in 2018. The editor-in-chief is Owain Vaughan.

== Abstracting and indexing ==
The journal is abstracted and indexed in:

- Science Citation Index Expanded
- Scopus

According to the Journal Citation Reports, the journal has a 2022 impact factor of 34.3.
