= Katrina Ray =

British biologist

Katrina Ray is an English biologist and the chief editor of Nature Reviews Gastroenterology & Hepatology.

== Education ==
Ray has a bachelor's degree in microbiology from the University of Manchester and a PhD from Imperial College London where she studied Shigella flexneri.

== Career ==
Ray has worked at the Institut Pasteur, the Max Planck Institute for Infection Biology, and the Karolinska Institutet. She started working at Nature Reviews in 2010 and has worked in Nature Reviews Rheumatology and also Nature Reviews Gastroenterology & Hepatology where she became the chief editor in 2014.

Her research focusses on gastroenterology, infection, microbiota, neurogastroenterology, and viral hepatitis. She has advocated for people to consider gut microbes as a "human microbial organ."

=== Selected publications ===
- Gut microbiota: married to our gut microbiota Nature Reviews Gastroenterology & Hepatology. 2012 Oct;9(10):555. doi: 10.1038/nrgastro.2012.165. PMID 23034427.
- Mapping the Cells in the Liver — Unchartered Subtypes and Heterogeneity, Nature Reviews Gastroenterology & Hepatology, July 30, 2019 doi 10.1038/s41575-019-0192-0

== Personal life ==
Ray lives in London, England.
