= ResearchSat =

ResearchSat - Australian space biotechnology company

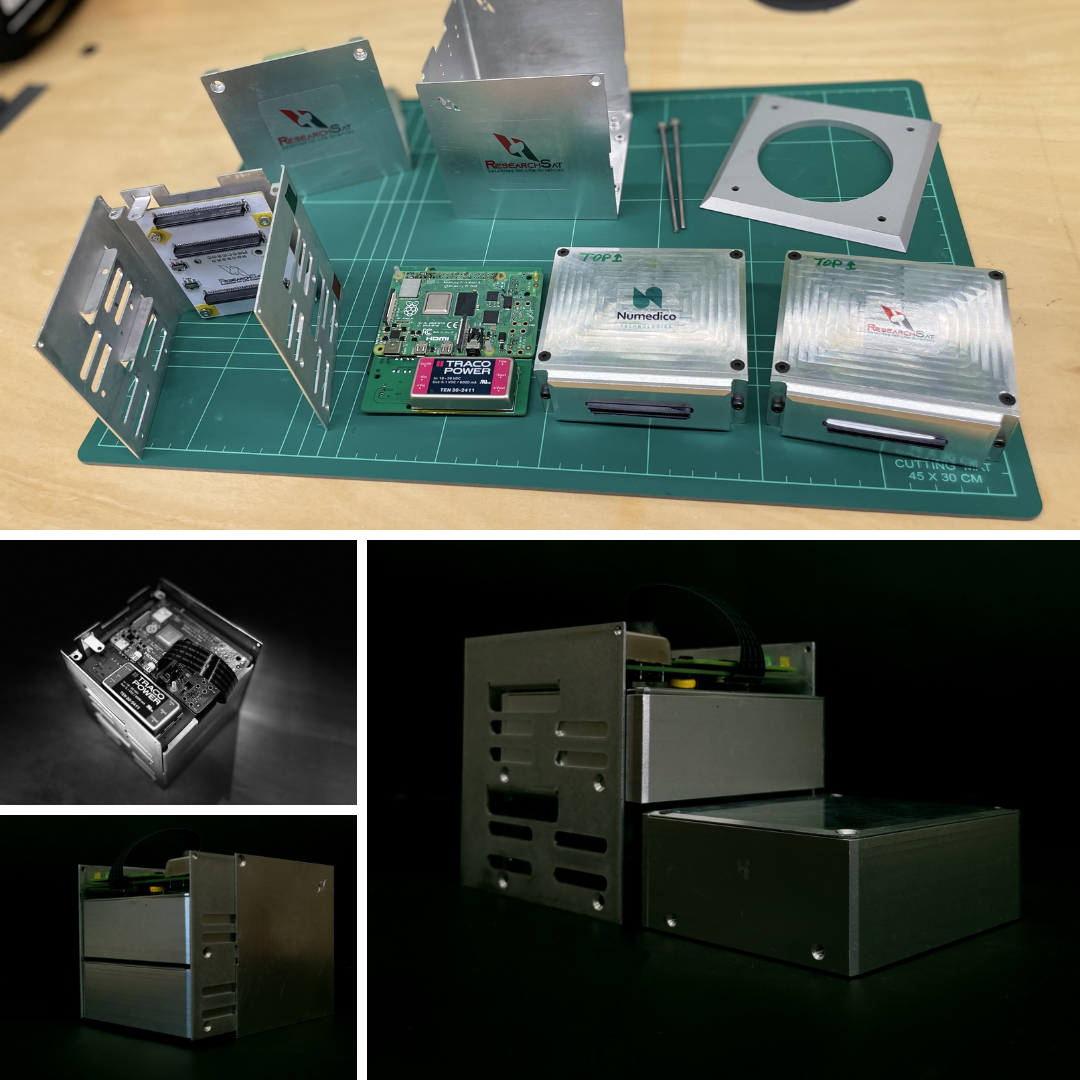
ResearchSat ADI Alpha Satellite Payload launched in 2022

ResearchSat Pty Ltd is an Australian space biotechnology company that develops payloads and experiment platforms for biological research in microgravity. Established in 2018, the company has conducted suborbital experiments and contributed hardware to research with RMIT University.

== History ==
ResearchSat was founded in 2018 by aerospace engineers Raviteja Duggineni and Jibin Jeffrey Dhanaraj. The company was initially bootstrapped and later developed a modular research payload intended to host biological experiments during spaceflight. In 2023, ResearchSat acquired South Australian high-altitude balloon operator Up&Up Space. The acquisition added a lower-cost platform for testing components in near-space conditions before suborbital or orbital missions.

== Missions and research ==
In November 2022, ResearchSat launched its ADI-Alpha payload aboard a sounding rocket from the Esrange Space Center in Sweden. The payload reached an altitude of approximately 260 km (160 mi) and experienced about six minutes of microgravity before returning to Earth.

ResearchSat later collaborated with RMIT University on a study of Bacillus subtilis spores exposed to launch acceleration, short-duration microgravity and re-entry deceleration. ResearchSat and RMIT developed a custom three-dimensional-printed sample holder for the flight. The study, published in npj Microgravity in 2025, found no observable change in the spores' growth or structure after the flight.

In February 2024, two payloads delivered by ResearchSat flew on the German Aerospace Center's MAPHEUS-14 sounding rocket. The Australian Space Agency described the payloads as a biological-cell monitoring experiment and a contingency communications unit for small satellites. The rocket reached approximately 265 km (165 mi) during the flight.

In 2026, a ResearchSat-led project with AltData and AICRAFT received A$150,000 from the South Australian Space Collaboration and Innovation Fund. The project was funded to combine microgravity experiment data with artificial-intelligence models for pharmaceutical research.
