= Npj Quantum Materials =

Academic journal

npj Quantum Materials
- Discipline: Quantum materials
- Language: English
- Edited by: Sang-Wook Cheong, Steven Kivelson

Publication details
- History: 2016-present
- Publisher: Nature Publishing Group
- Frequency: Continuous
- Open access: Yes
- License: CC-BY
- Impact factor: 5.4 (2023)

Standard abbreviations
- ISO 4: npj Quantum Mater.

Indexing
- ISSN: 2397-4648

Links
- Journal homepage; Online archive

npj Quantum Materials is a peer-reviewed open-access scientific journal covering the properties, fabrication techniques and applications of quantum materials. This includes superconducting and topological materials, correlation phenomena, and quantum effects in materials and systems for energy generation.

Founded in 2016, it is published by the Nature Publishing Group in cooperation with Nanjing University. Sang-Wook Cheong and Steven Kivelson act as editors in chief.

== Abstracting and indexing ==
The journal is abstracted and indexed in major indexing services like Science Citation Index Expanded (SCI-E), Current Contents, Scopus and the Directory of Open Access Journals (DOAJ).
