= Signal Transduction and Targeted Therapy =

- Discipline: Biomedicine; Pharmacology
- Language: English
- Edited by: David J. Kerr; Kang Zhang; Yu-Quan Wei

Publication details
- History: 2016–present
- Publisher: Nature Research
- Frequency: Continuous
- Open access: Yes
- Impact factor: 81.2 (2025)

Standard abbreviations
- ISO 4: Signal Transduct. Target. Ther.

Indexing
- ISSN: 2095-9907 (print); 2059-3635 (web)
- LCCN: 2016243461
- OCLC no.: 1026877558

Links
- Journal homepage; Online archive

Signal Transduction and Targeted Therapy (STTT) is a multidisciplinary, peer-reviewed, open access scientific journal covering biomedical research with a particular focus on signal transduction and its application to the drug development process. It was established in 2016 and is published by Nature Research. The editors-in-chief are David J. Kerr (Oxford University), Kang Zhang (Macau University of Science and Technology), and Yu-Quan Wei (West China Medical Center). According to the Journal Citation Reports, the journal has a 2025 impact factor of 81.2.

== Abstract & Indexing ==
- Science Citation Index Expanded
- BIOSIS
- Open Access Journals (DOAJ)
- MEDLINE
- PubMed Central (PMC)
- Scopus

== Sponsoring ==
The Journal is sponsored by West China Medical Center.
