= Silvana Botti =

Professor of physics

Academic background
- Education: University of Pavia

Academic work
- Discipline: Physics
- Sub-discipline: Theoretical spectroscopy
- Institutions: Ruhr University Bochum

Silvana Botti is a full professor for Theory of Excited States of Integrated Solid State Systems at the Ruhr University Bochum. She is an expert in the development of first-principles methods for electronic excitations and methods for theoretical spectroscopy.

== Education and professional life ==
She did her PhD at the University of Pavia in 2002. After her PhD, she was a Marie-Curie Fellow at the University of Paris-Saclay. She was also appointed CNRS Research Scientist there in 2004. In 2008, she moved to University of Lyon where she habilitated in 2010. In 2014, she became a full professor for physics at the University of Jena. Her research group was a member of the European Theoretical Spectroscopy Facility. Since 2023, she has been a full professor for Theory of Excited States of Integrated Solid State Systems at Ruhr University Bochum.

== Research ==
Her research focuses on theoretical spectroscopy and the development of first-principles methods for electronic excitations based on (time-dependent) density functional theory and many-body perturbation theory. She edited the book "First Principles Approaches to Spectroscopic Properties of Complex Materials". She is an associate editor of npj Computational Materials. Botti was part of an international research collaboration on a silicon-based direct bandgap light emitter, which was announced to be the "Breakthrough of the Year" by Physics World in 2020.
