= Nature Cancer =

- Discipline: Oncology
- Language: English
- Edited by: Alexia-Ileana Zaromytidou

Publication details
- History: 2020-present
- Publisher: Nature Portfolio
- Frequency: Monthly
- Open access: Hybrid
- Impact factor: 23.177 (2021)

Standard abbreviations
- ISO 4: Nat. Cancer

Indexing
- CODEN: NCAADQ
- ISSN: 2662-1347
- OCLC no.: 1251782751

Links
- Journal homepage; Online archive

Nature Cancer is a monthly peer-reviewed academic journal published by Nature Portfolio. It was established in 2020. The editor-in-chief is Alexia-Ileana Zaromytidou.

== Abstracting and indexing ==
The journal is abstracted and indexed in:

- PubMed
- MEDLINE
- Science Citation Index Expanded
- Scopus

According to the Journal Citation Reports, the journal has a 2021 impact factor of 23.177, ranking it 11th out of 245 journals in the category "Oncology".
