= Nature Metabolism =

- Discipline: Metabolism
- Language: English
- Edited by: Christoph Schmitt

Publication details
- History: 2019–present
- Publisher: Nature Portfolio
- Frequency: Monthly
- Open access: Hybrid
- Impact factor: 20.8 (2022)

Standard abbreviations
- ISO 4: Nat. Metab.

Indexing
- CODEN: NMAED6
- ISSN: 2522-5812
- LCCN: 2019243063
- OCLC no.: 1082146181

Links
- Journal homepage; Online archive

Nature Metabolism is a monthly peer-reviewed academic journal published by Nature Portfolio. It was established in 2019. The editor-in-chief is Christoph Schmitt.

== Abstracting and indexing ==
The journal is abstracted and indexed in:

- PubMed/MEDLINE
- Science Citation Index Expanded
- Scopus

According to the Journal Citation Reports, the journal has a 2022 impact factor of 20.8, ranking it 4th out of 146 journals in the category "Endocrinology & Metabolism".
