= Joseph J. Berry =

American scientist

- Education: Pennsylvania State University; Goshen College
- Scientific career
- Workplaces: National Renewable Energy Laboratory; National Institute of Standards and Technology
- Thesis: Magnetism, semiconductors and spins : hybrid ferromagnetic semiconductor and semiconductor (2001)

Joseph J. Berry is an American scientist who is principal scientist at National Renewable Energy Laboratory. He leads the United States Department of Energy Solar Energy Technology Office program on perovskite solar cells, and is director of the U.S. Manufacturing of Advance Perovskites consortium.

== Early life and education ==
Berry was an undergraduate student in physics at Goshen College. For his doctoral studies, Berry studied spin transport in semiconductor heterostructures at Pennsylvania State University. He was particularly interested in coherent spin transport across interfaces and spin polarized transport in two-dimensional electron gasses. He moved to the National Institute of Standards and Technology for his postdoctoral studies, where he developed narrow band spectroscopy for III-V quantum dots.

== Research and career ==
Berry is a principal scientist at National Renewable Energy Laboratory, where he develops photovoltaics and semiconductor materials. He concentrates on interfacial engineering as a strategy to improve device efficiency. Berry has focused on hybrid photovoltaic materials, including perovskite solar cells. He was promoted to senior research fellow in 2014.

Berry leads the United States Department of Energy Solar Energy Technology Office program on perovskite solar cells, is director of the U.S. Manufacturing of Advance Perovskites consortium, and is principal investigator on the National Renewable Energy Laboratory Center for Hybrid Organic Inorganic Semiconductors for Energy Energy Frontier Research Center. In 2020 he coordinated an effort to boost the production of perovskite solar cells. In 2022, NREL demonstrated a 24% efficient perovskite solar cell that remained functional for over 2,400 hours.

== Selected publications ==
- Zhen Li; Mengjin Yang; Ji-Sang Park; Su-Huai Wei; Joseph J. Berry; Kai Zhu (30 December 2015). "Stabilizing Perovskite Structures by Tuning Tolerance Factor: Formation of Formamidinium and Cesium Lead Iodide Solid-State Alloys". Chemistry of Materials. 28 (1): 284–292. doi:10.1021/acs.chemmater.5b04107. ISSN 0897-4756. Wikidata Q115170652.
- Jeffrey A. Christians; Philip Schulz; Jonathan S. Tinkham; et al. (January 2018), Tailored interfaces of unencapsulated perovskite solar cells for >1,000 hour operational stability, vol. 3, pp. 68–74, doi:10.1038/s41560-017-0067-y, Wikidata Q58073356
- Zhen Li; Talysa R. Klein; Dong Hoe Kim; Mengjin Yang; Joseph J. Berry; Maikel F. A. M. van Hest; Kai Zhu (27 March 2018). "Scalable fabrication of perovskite solar cells". Nature Reviews Materials. 3 (4): 18017. doi:10.1038/natrevmats.2018.17. ISSN 2058-8437. Wikidata Q61863949.
