= Principles of Biology =

College level electronic textbook

- Subject: Biology
- Genre: Textbook
- Publisher: Nature Publishing
- Publication date: 2011

Principles of Biology is a college level biology electronic textbook published by Nature Publishing in 2011. The book is not a digitally reformatted version of a paper book. The book, the first in a projected series, is Nature Publishing's first foray into textbook publishing.

== Format ==
Principles is composed of 200 modules, which can be customized by the instructor. The modules combine text, images, simulations, interactive exercises, self-tests, and formal tests. The book draws on the science journal Nature's archive of research papers. It was created by a group of more than 100 scientists, instructors, scientific illustrators, interaction designers, and faculty reviewers. It is available in formats for computers, tablets, and smartphones. No traditional paper edition is available. The book is purchased on a one-time payment subscription basis, with the purchase covering all future updates or supplements.

== Reception ==
The book has been adopted for use at California State University. One favorable reviewer described the text as "post-Gutenberg", referring to the Printing Revolution that occurred upon the development of the movable type printing press by Johannes Gutenberg ca 1439. The book, and its umbrella textbook publishing division, has been described as potentially breaking down the traditional textbook publishing business model. The work has been compared with other publishers' electronic textbook experiments, including Wolfram Research.
