= Nature (journal) =

British scientific journal

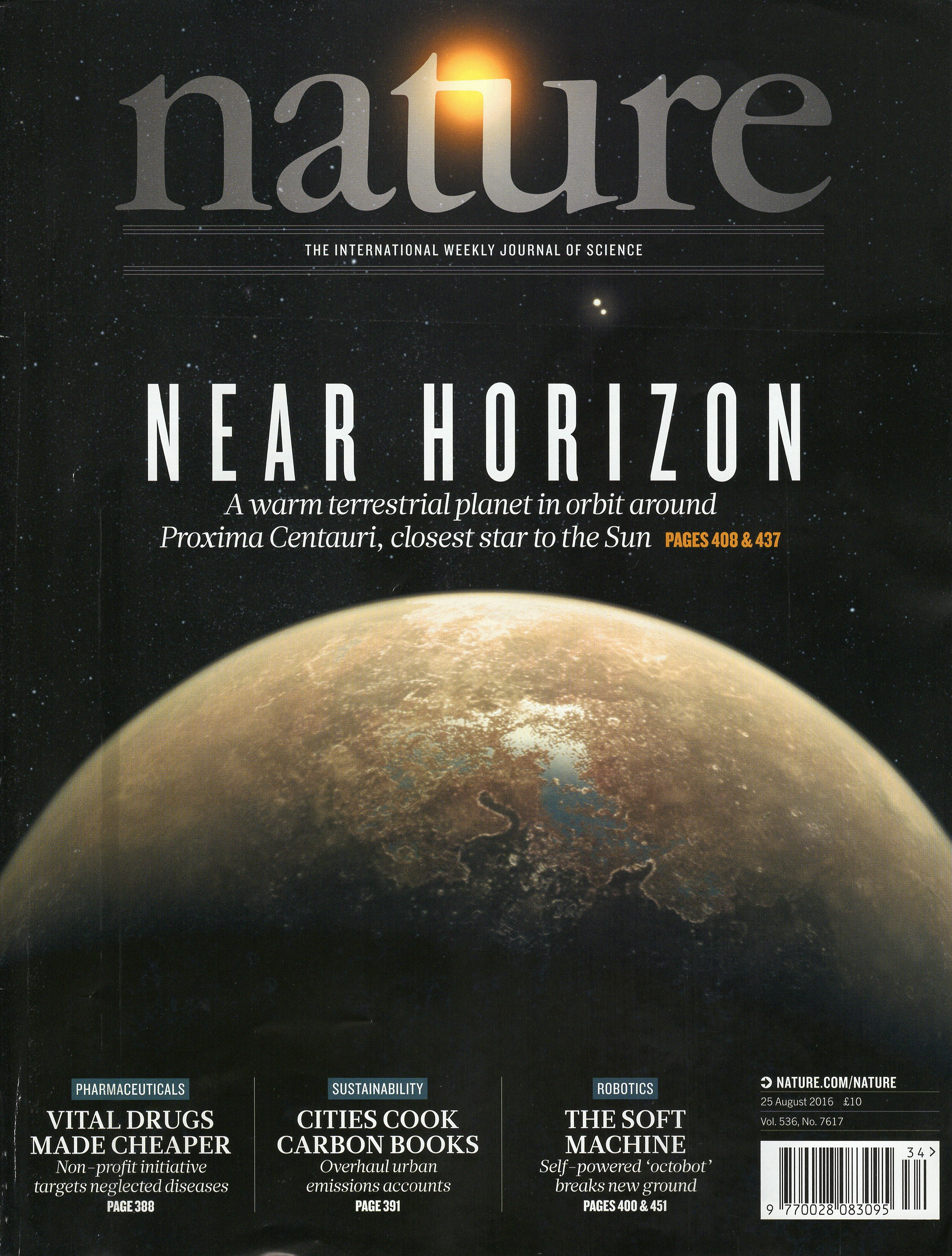
- Cover of a 2016 issue of Nature featuring artistic representation of Proxima Centauri and its planet Proxima Centauri b
- Discipline: Natural sciences
- Language: English
- Edited by: Magdalena Skipper

Publication details
- History: 4 November 1869 – present
- Publisher: Nature Portfolio (subsidiary of Springer Nature) (United Kingdom)
- Frequency: Weekly
- Open access: Hybrid
- Impact factor: 56.1 (2025)

Standard abbreviations
- ISO 4: Nature

Indexing
- CODEN: NATUAS
- ISSN: 0028-0836 (print); 1476-4687 (web)
- LCCN: 12037118
- OCLC no.: 01586310

Links
- Journal homepage; Online access; Online archive

Nature is a British weekly international scientific journal publishing peer-reviewed research across the natural sciences, including biology, physics, chemistry, the earth sciences, and related interdisciplinary fields. It operates editorial offices in London, the United States, continental Europe, and Asia under the international scientific publishing company Springer Nature. According to the 2022 Journal Citation Reports, Nature had one of the highest impact factors among multidisciplinary science journals (50.5), reflecting its strong citation influence within the scientific literature; some commentators also regard it as among the most influential scientific journals worldwide. In 2007, Nature (together with Science) received the Prince of Asturias Award for Communications and Humanity. As of 2012, it claimed an online readership of about three million unique readers per month.

Founded in the autumn of 1869, Nature was first circulated by Norman Lockyer and Alexander MacMillan as a public forum for scientific innovations. The mid-20th century facilitated an editorial expansion for the journal; Nature redoubled its efforts in explanatory and scientific journalism. The late 1980s and early 1990s saw the creation of a network of editorial offices outside of Britain and the establishment of ten new supplementary, specialty publications (e.g. Nature Materials). Since the late 2000s, dedicated editorial and current affairs columns have been created weekly, and electoral endorsements are featured. The primary source of the journal remains, as established at its founding, research scientists; editing standards are primarily concerned with technical readability.

The main research published in Nature consists mostly of papers (articles or letters) in lightly-edited form. They are highly technical and dense, but, due to imposed text limits, they are typically summaries of larger works. Fewer than 8% of submitted papers are accepted for publication. Nature’s research articles are widely cited and often attract international attention, and the journal has occasionally been involved in disputes and academic controversies, such as debates over retractions, peer-review processes, and methodological standards.

In addition to primary research papers, Nature publishes commentary, analysis, news, and features on topics such as research funding, science policy, ethical issues in science, and notable scientific developments; there are also sections on books, arts, and short science fiction stories. Innovations or breakthroughs in any scientific or technological field are featured in the journal as spotlight articles, which are news or magazine-style papers and therefore do not receive similar recognition as research articles. Some spotlight articles are also funded by partners or sponsors.

== History ==
=== Background ===
The huge progress in science and mathematics during the 19th century was recorded in journals written mostly in German or French, as well as in English. Britain underwent enormous technological and industrial changes and advances, particularly in the latter half of the 19th century. The most respected scientific journals of this time were the refereed journals of the Royal Society, which had published many of the great works from Isaac Newton and Michael Faraday to Charles Darwin. In addition, the number of popular science periodicals doubled from the 1850s to the 1860s. According to the editors of these popular science magazines, the publications were designed to serve as "organs of science", in essence, a means of connecting the public to the scientific world.

Nature, first created in 1869, was not the first magazine of its kind in Britain. One journal to precede Nature was Recreative Science: A Record and Remembrancer of Intellectual Observation, which, founded in 1859, began as a natural history magazine and progressed to include more physical observational science and technical subjects and less natural history. The journal's name changed from its original title to Intellectual Observer: A Review of Natural History, Microscopic Research, and Recreative Science and then to the Student and Intellectual Observer of Science, Literature, and Art. While Recreative Science had attempted to include more physical sciences such as astronomy and archaeology, the Intellectual Observer broadened itself further to include literature and art as well. Similar to Recreative Science was the scientific journal Popular Science Review, created in 1862, which covered different fields of science by creating subsections titled "Scientific Summary" or "Quarterly Retrospect", with book reviews and commentary on the latest scientific works and publications. Two other journals produced in England prior to the development of Nature were the Quarterly Journal of Science and Scientific Opinion, established in 1864 and 1868, respectively. The journal most closely related to Nature in its editorship and format was The Reader, created in 1863; the publication mixed science with literature and art in an attempt to reach an audience outside of the scientific community, similar to Popular Science Review.

These similar journals all ultimately failed. The Popular Science Review survived longest, lasting 20 years and ending its publication in 1881; Recreative Science ceased publication as the Student and Intellectual Observer in 1871. The Quarterly Journal, after undergoing a number of editorial changes, ceased publication in 1885. The Reader terminated in 1867, and finally, Scientific Opinion lasted a mere 2 years, until June 1870.

=== Creation ===
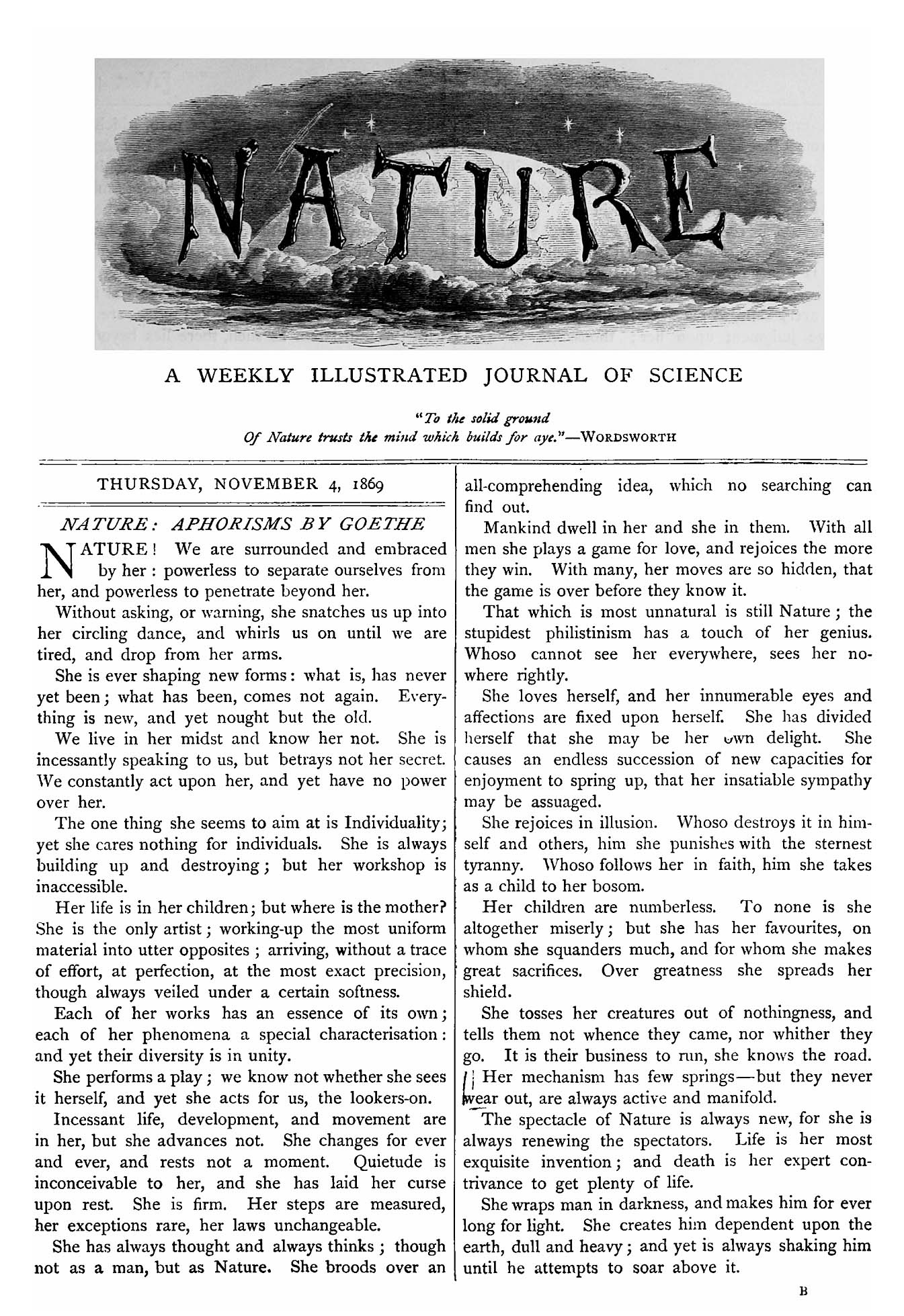
First title page, 4 November 1869

Not long after the conclusion of The Reader, a former editor, Norman Lockyer, decided to create a new scientific journal titled Nature, taking its name from a line by William Wordsworth: "To the solid ground of nature trusts the Mind that builds for aye". First owned and published by Alexander Macmillan, Nature was similar to its predecessors in its attempt to "provide cultivated readers with an accessible forum for reading about advances in scientific knowledge." Janet Browne has proposed that "far more than any other science journal of the period, Nature was conceived, born, and raised to serve polemic purpose." Many of the early editions of Nature consisted of articles written by members of a group that called itself the X Club, a group of scientists known for having liberal, progressive, and somewhat controversial scientific beliefs for their time. Initiated by Thomas Henry Huxley, the group consisted of such important scientists as Joseph Dalton Hooker, Herbert Spencer, and John Tyndall, along with another five scientists and mathematicians; these scientists were all avid supporters of Darwin's theory of evolution as common descent, a theory which, during the latter half of the 19th century, received a great deal of criticism among more conservative groups of scientists. Perhaps it was in part its scientific liberality that made Nature a longer-lasting success than its predecessors. John Maddox, editor of Nature from 1966 to 1973 and from 1980 to 1995, suggested at a celebratory dinner for the journal's centennial edition that perhaps it was the journalistic qualities of Nature that drew readers in; "journalism" Maddox states, "is a way of creating a sense of community among people who would otherwise be isolated from each other. This is what Lockyer's journal did from the start." In addition, Maddox mentions that the financial backing of the journal in its first years by the Macmillan family also allowed the journal to flourish and develop more freely than scientific journals before it.

==== Editors ====
Norman Lockyer, the founder of Nature, was a professor at Imperial College. He was succeeded as editor in 1919 by Sir Richard Gregory. Gregory helped to establish Nature in the international scientific community. His obituary by the Royal Society stated: "Gregory was always very interested in the international contacts of science, and in the columns of Nature, he always gave generous space to accounts of the activities of the International Scientific Unions." During the years 1945 to 1973, editorship of Nature changed three times, first in 1945 to A. J. V. Gale and L. J. F. Brimble (who in 1958 became the sole editor), then to John Maddox in 1965, and finally to David Davies in 1973. In 1980, Maddox returned as editor and retained his position until 1995. Philip Campbell became editor-in-chief of all Nature publications until 2018. Magdalena Skipper has since become editor-in-chief.

==== Expansion and development ====
In 1970, Nature first opened its Washington office; other branches opened in New York in 1985, Tokyo and Munich in 1987, Paris in 1989, San Francisco in 2001, Boston in 2004, and Hong Kong in 2005. In 1971, under John Maddox's editorship, the journal split into Nature Physical Sciences (published on Mondays), Nature New Biology (published on Wednesdays), and Nature (published on Fridays). In 1974, Maddox was no longer editor, and the journals were merged into Nature. Starting in the 1980s, the journal underwent a great deal of expansion, launching over ten new journals. These new journals comprise Nature Research, which was created in 1999 under the name Nature Publishing Group and includes Nature, Nature Research Journals, Stockton Press Specialist Journals and Macmillan Reference (renamed NPG Reference). In 1996, Nature created its own website and in 1999 Nature Publishing Group began its series of Nature Reviews. Some articles and papers are available for free on the Nature website, while others require the purchase of premium access to the site. As of 2012, Nature claimed an online readership of about 3 million unique readers per month.

On 30 October 2008, Nature endorsed an American presidential candidate for the first time when it supported Barack Obama during his campaign in America's 2008 presidential election. In October 2012, an Arabic edition of the magazine was launched in partnership with King Abdulaziz City for Science and Technology. As of the time it was released, it had about 10,000 subscribers. On 2 December 2014, Nature announced that it would allow its subscribers and a group of selected media outlets to share links allowing free, "read-only" access to content from its journals. These articles are presented using the digital rights management system ReadCube (which is funded by the Macmillan subsidiary Digital Science), and does not allow readers to download, copy, print, or otherwise distribute the content. While it does, to an extent, provide free online access to articles, it is not a true open access scheme due to its restrictions on re-use and distribution. On 15 January 2015, details of a proposed merger with Springer Science+Business Media were announced.

In May 2015, it came under the umbrella of Springer Nature, by the merger of Springer Science+Business Media and Holtzbrinck Publishing Group's Nature Publishing Group, Palgrave Macmillan, and Macmillan Education. Since 2011, the journal has published Nature's 10 "people who mattered" during the year, as part of their annual review.

== Publication in Nature ==
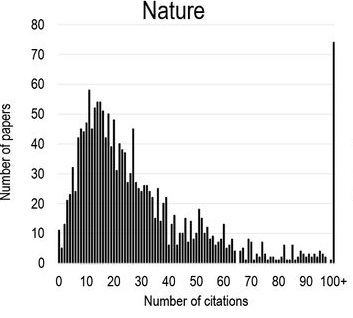
Skewed curve of citations per article in 2015 to Nature articles from 2013 to 2014

According to Science, another academic journal, being published in Nature has been known to carry a certain level of prestige in academia. In particular, empirical papers are often highly cited, which can lead to promotions, grant funding, and attention from the mainstream media. Because of these positive feedback effects, competition among scientists to publish in high-level journals like Nature and its closest competitor, Science, can be very fierce. Nature's impact factor, a measure of how many citations a journal generates in other works, was 42.778 in 2019 (as measured by Thomson ISI). However, as with many journals, most papers receive far fewer citations than the impact factor would indicate. Nature's journal impact factor carries a long tail.

Studies of methodological quality and reliability have found that some high-prestige journals, including Nature, "publish significantly substandard structures", and overall "reliability of published research works in several fields may be decreasing with increasing journal rank".

As with most other professional scientific journals, papers undergo an initial screening by the editor, followed by peer review. In this process, the editor selects several other scientists to read and critique articles, based on their expertise with the subject matter but who have no connection to the research under review. These critiques are then given to the original author, who makes revisions based on feedback. In the case of Nature, articles are generally sent for peer review if it is decided that they deal with a topical subject and are sufficiently ground-breaking in that particular field. As a consequence, the majority of submitted papers are rejected without peer review.

According to Nature's original mission statement:

It is intended, FIRST, to place before the general public the grand results of Scientific Work and Scientific Discovery; and to urge the claims of Science to a more general recognition in Education and in Daily Life; and, SECONDLY, to aid Scientific men themselves, by giving early information of all advances made in any branch of Natural knowledge throughout the world, and by affording them an opportunity of discussing the various Scientific questions which arise from time to time.

This was later revised to:

First, to serve scientists through prompt publication of significant advances in any branch of science, and to provide a forum for the reporting and discussion of news and issues concerning science. Second, to ensure that the results of science are rapidly disseminated to the public throughout the world, in a fashion that conveys their significance for knowledge, culture and daily life.

=== Landmark papers ===
Many of the most significant scientific breakthroughs in modern history have been first published in Nature. The following is a selection of scientific breakthroughs published in Nature, all of which had far-reaching consequences, and the citation for the article in which they were published.

- Wave nature of particles (Davisson–Germer experiment) — C. Davisson and L. H. Germer (1927). "The scattering of electrons by a single crystal of nickel" (PDF). Nature. 119 (2998): 558–560. Bibcode:1927Natur.119..558D. doi:10.1038/119558a0. S2CID 4104602.
- The neutron — J. Chadwick (1932). "Possible existence of a neutron". Nature. 129 (3252): 312. Bibcode:1932Natur.129Q.312C. doi:10.1038/129312a0. S2CID 4076465.
- Nuclear fission — L. Meitner and O. R. Frisch (1939). "Disintegration of uranium by neutrons: a new type of nuclear reaction". Nature. 143 (3615): 239–240. Bibcode:1939Natur.143..239M. doi:10.1038/143239a0. S2CID 4113262.
- The structure of DNA — J. D. Watson and F. H. C. Crick (1953). "Molecular structure of Nucleic Acids: A structure for deoxyribose nucleic acid". Nature. 171 (4356): 737–738. Bibcode:1953Natur.171..737W. doi:10.1038/171737a0. PMID 13054692. S2CID 4253007.
- First molecular protein structure (myoglobin) — J. C. Kendrew; G. Bodo; H. M. Dintzis; R. G. Parrish; H. Wyckoff; D. C. Phillips (1958). "A three-dimensional model of the myoglobin molecule obtained by X-ray analysis". Nature. 181 (4610): 662–666. Bibcode:1958Natur.181..662K. doi:10.1038/181662a0. PMID 13517261. S2CID 4162786.
- Plate tectonics — J. Tuzo Wilson (1966). "Did the Atlantic close and then re-open?". Nature. 211 (5050): 676–681. Bibcode:1966Natur.211..676W. doi:10.1038/211676a0. S2CID 4226266.
- Pulsars — Hewish, A.; Bell, S. J.; Pilkington, J. D. H.; Scott, P. F.; Collins, R. A. (1968). "Observation of a Rapidly Pulsating Radio Source". Nature. 217 (5130): 709–713. Bibcode:1968Natur.217..709H. doi:10.1038/217709a0. S2CID 4277613.
- The ozone hole — J. C. Farman, B. G. Gardiner and J. D. Shanklin (1985). "Large losses of total ozone in Antarctica reveal seasonal ClOx/NOx interaction". Nature. 315 (6016): 207–210. Bibcode:1985Natur.315..207F. doi:10.1038/315207a0. S2CID 4346468.
- First cloning of a mammal (Dolly the sheep) — Wilmut, I.; Schnieke, A. E.; McWhir, J.; Kind, A. J.; Campbell, K. H. S. (1997). "Viable offspring derived from fetal and adult mammalian cells". Nature. 385 (6619): 810–813. Bibcode:1997Natur.385..810W. doi:10.1038/385810a0. PMID 9039911. S2CID 4260518.
- The human genome — International Human Genome Sequencing Consortium (2001). "Initial sequencing and analysis of the human genome". Nature. 409 (6822): 860–921. Bibcode:2001Natur.409..860L. doi:10.1038/35057062. hdl:2027.42/62798. PMID 11237011.

=== Controversies ===
Nature has famously rejected papers that later became foundational to modern science. For example, Enrico Fermi's breakthrough paper on the weak interaction theory of beta decay was rejected by Nature because it was considered too remote from reality. (Fermi's paper was instead published by Zeitschrift für Physik in 1934.) In another example, Nature initially rejected Paul Lauterbur and Peter Mansfield's research on MRI, which would later win them the Nobel Prize in Medicine. Only after Lauterbur appealed the rejection did Nature publish their work.

In a 2003 editorial, "Coping with Peer Rejection", Nature acknowledged several other rejection missteps:

[T]here are unarguable faux pas in our history. These include the rejection of Cherenkov radiation, Hideki Yukawa's meson, work on photosynthesis by Johann Deisenhofer, Robert Huber and Hartmut Michel, and the initial rejection (but eventual acceptance) of Stephen Hawking's black-hole radiation.

The journal has also faced scrutiny for not following editorial procedure. For example, before publishing Watson and Crick's 1953 paper on the structure of DNA, Nature did not send the paper to peer review. John Maddox, Nature's editor, stated: "The Watson and Crick paper was not peer-reviewed by Nature ... the paper could not have been refereed: its correctness is self-evident. No referee working in the field ... could have kept his mouth shut once he saw the structure."

In June 1988, Nature published a controversial and seemingly anomalous paper detailing Jacques Benveniste and his team's work studying water memory. The paper concluded that less than a single molecule of antibody diluted in water could trigger an immune response in human basophils, defying the physical law of mass action. The paper gained substantial media attention in Paris, France, chiefly because their research sought funding from homeopathic medicine companies. Public inquiry prompted Nature to mandate an extensive and stringent experimental replication in Benveniste's lab, through which his team's results were refuted.

The journal has also been criticised for its social stances. In 2017, Nature published an editorial entitled "Removing Statues of Historical Figures Risks Whitewashing History: Science Must Acknowledge Mistakes as it Marks its Past". The article argued against removing monuments to scientists with controversial legacies. Specifically, the editorial cited examples of J. Marion Sims, the 'Father of gynecology', who experimented on African American female slaves who were unable to give informed consent, and Thomas Parran Jr., who oversaw the Tuskegee Syphilis Experiment. The editorial made the case that removing monuments could result in "whitewashing history" and stated, "Instead of removing painful reminders, perhaps these should be supplemented." The article drew condemnation, particularly on social media, and was quickly modified by Nature. Nature acknowledged that the article, as originally written, was "offensive and poorly worded" and published selected letters of response. The controversy was intensified as the editorial was published shortly after the violent Unite the Right rally in Charlottesville, Virginia. In response, several scientists called for a boycott. On 18 September 2017, the editorial was updated and edited by Philip Campbell, the editor of the journal.

In April 2020, the journal apologized for its initial coverage of the COVID-19 pandemic in which it linked China and the city of Wuhan with the outbreak, which may have led to racist attacks.

Before the election for the 46th President of the United States, Nature published an editorial entitled "Why Nature Supports Joe Biden for US President". Political scientists Floyd Jiuyun Zhang found that this decreased trust in Nature and in the institution of science more broadly. Philosopher of science Byron Hyde argues that repeated presidential endorsements since 2012 were a mistake and that any benefits are overshadowed by the loss of public trust.

==== Retractions ====
From 2000 to 2001, a series of five fraudulent papers by Jan Hendrik Schön were published in Nature. The papers, about semiconductors, were revealed to contain falsified data and other scientific fraud. In 2003, Nature retracted the papers. The Schön scandal was not limited to Nature; other prominent journals, such as Science and Physical Review, also retracted papers by Schön.

In 2024, a paper titled "Pluripotency of Mesenchymal Stem Cells Derived from Adult Marrow", published in 2002, was retracted due to concerns raised regarding some of the panels shown in a figure, making it the most-cited retracted paper ever.

== Science fiction ==
In 1999, Nature began publishing science fiction short stories. The brief "vignettes" are printed in a series called "Futures". The stories appeared in 1999 and 2000, again in 2005 and 2006, and have appeared weekly since July 2007. Sister publication Nature Physics also printed stories in 2007 and 2008. In 2005, Nature was awarded the European Science Fiction Society's Best Publisher award for the "Futures" series. One hundred of the Nature stories between 1999 and 2006 were published as the collection Futures from Nature in 2008. Another collection, Futures from Nature 2, was published in 2014.

== Publication ==
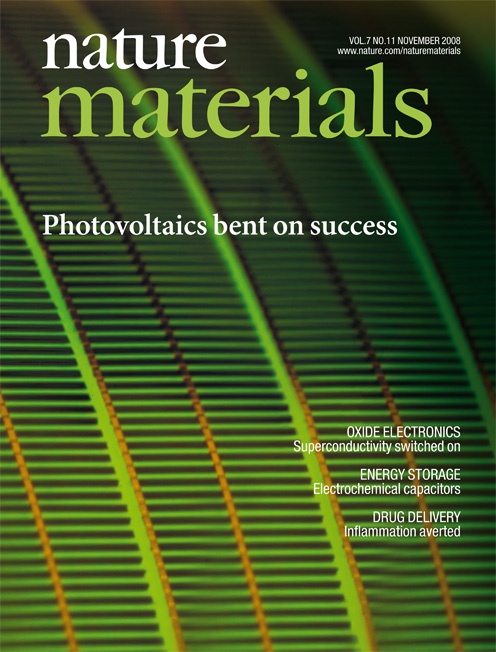
Nature Materials, a specialized journal from Nature Portfolio, 2018

Nature is edited and published in the United Kingdom by a division of the international scientific publishing company Springer Nature that publishes academic journals, magazines, online databases, and services in science and medicine. Nature has offices in London, New York City, San Francisco, Washington, D.C., Boston, Tokyo, Hong Kong, Paris, Munich, and Basingstoke. Nature Portfolio also publishes other specialized journals, including Nature Neuroscience, Nature Biotechnology, Nature Methods, the Nature Clinical Practice series of journals, Nature Structural & Molecular Biology, Nature Chemistry, and the Nature Reviews series of journals.

Since 2005, each issue of Nature has been accompanied by a Nature Podcast featuring highlights from the issue and interviews with the articles' authors and the journalists covering the research. It is presented by Kerri Smith and features interviews with scientists on the latest research, as well as news reports from Nature's editors and journalists. The Nature Podcast was founded – and the first 100 episodes were produced and presented – by clinician and virologist Chris Smith of Cambridge and The Naked Scientists.

Nature Portfolio actively supports the self-archiving process and, in 2002, was one of the first publishers to allow authors to post their contributions on their personal websites by requesting an exclusive licence to publish, rather than requiring authors to transfer copyright. In December 2007, Nature Publishing Group introduced the Creative Commons attribution-non-commercial-share alike unported licence for those articles in Nature journals that are publishing the primary sequence of an organism's genome for the first time.

In 2008, a collection of articles from Nature was edited by John S. Partington under the title H. G. Wells in Nature, 1893–1946: A Reception Reader and published by Peter Lang.

== Communications journals ==
Nature also publishes a number of journals in different disciplines, all prefixed with "Communications", which complement their other journals. These include:

- Communications Biology
- Communications Chemistry
- Communications Earth & Environment
- Communications Engineering
- Communications Materials
- Communications Medicine
- Communications Physics
- Communications Psychology

== General bibliography ==
- Baldwin, Melinda (2016). Making Nature: The History of a Scientific Journal. Chicago, Illinois: University of Chicago Press. ISBN 9780226261454.
- Barton, R. (1996). "Just Before Nature: The Purposes of Science and the Purposes of Popularization in Some English Popular Science Journals of the 1860s". Annals of Science. 55 (1): 1–33. doi:10.1080/00033799800200101. PMID 11619805.
- Browne, J. (2002). Charles Darwin: The Power of Place. New York: Alfred A. Knopf, Incorporated. ISBN 978-0691114392.
