= Alexandra Flemming =

German biologist

Alexandra Flemming is a German biologist, academic, and the editor in chief of Nature Reviews Immunology.

== Education ==
Flemming studied molecular biology at the University of Freiburg before moving to South Africa to study infectious immunology at the University of Cape Town.

She obtained her PhD at the University of Freiburg's Max-Planck Institute for Immunology and won awards for her thesis about the role of the B cell signaling protein SLP‑65 in the malignant transformation of B cells. She continued studying as a European Molecular Biology Organization fellow and as a Human Frontiers Science Programme fellow, seconded to Cancer Research UK in London.

== Career ==
Flemming is employed in the department of molecular immunology in the faculty of biology at the University of Freiburg.

She joined Nature Reviews Drug Discovery as an associate editor before becoming the editor in chief of Nature Reviews Immunology in 2017.
