= NPG Asia Materials =

- Discipline: Materials science
- Language: English
- Edited by: Martin Vacha

Publication details
- History: 2009–present
- Publisher: Nature Publishing Group
- Frequency: Continuous
- Open access: Yes
- License: Creative Commons Attribution 4.0 International License
- Impact factor: 9.7 (2022)

Standard abbreviations
- ISO 4: NPG Asia Mater.

Indexing
- CODEN: NAMPCE
- ISSN: 1884-4057
- OCLC no.: 861209929

Links
- Journal homepage; Online archive

NPG Asia Materials is a peer-reviewed open access scientific journal focusing on materials science. It was established in 2009 and is published by the Nature Publishing Group. The founding editor-in-chief was Hideo Takezoe (Tokyo Institute of Technology); the current editor-in-chief is Martin Vacha (Tokyo Institute of Technology).

== Abstracting and indexing ==
The journal is abstracted and indexed in:

- Chemical Abstract Services
- Science Citation Index Expanded
- Scopus

According to the Journal Citation Reports, the journal has a 2021 impact factor of 10.990.
