= Nature Reviews Immunology =

- Discipline: Immunology
- Language: English
- Edited by: Alexandra Flemming

Publication details
- History: 2001–present
- Publisher: Nature Portfolio
- Frequency: Monthly
- Impact factor: 100.3 (2022)

Standard abbreviations
- ISO 4: Nat. Rev. Immunol.

Indexing
- CODEN: NRIABX
- ISSN: 1474-1733 (print); 1474-1741 (web)

Links
- Journal homepage; Online archive

Nature Reviews Immunology is a monthly review journal covering the field of immunology. The journal also publishes "Research highlight" articles, which are short summaries written by the editors that describe recent hot research papers. The editor-in-chief is Alexandra Flemming.

According to the Journal Citation Reports, the journal has a 2022 impact factor of 100.7, ranking it 1st in the category "Immunology".
