= Nature Machine Intelligence =

- Discipline: Artificial Intelligence, Machine Learning, and Robotics
- Language: English
- Edited by: Liesbeth Venema

Publication details
- History: 2019–present
- Publisher: Nature Portfolio (UK)
- Frequency: Monthly
- Open access: Hybrid
- Impact factor: 25.898 (2021)

Standard abbreviations
- ISO 4: Nat. Mach. Intell.

Indexing
- ISSN: 2522-5839
- OCLC no.: 1083291798

Links
- Journal homepage; Online archive

Nature Machine Intelligence is a monthly peer-reviewed scientific journal published by Nature Portfolio covering machine learning and artificial intelligence. The editor-in-chief is Liesbeth Venema.

== History ==
The journal was created in response to the machine learning explosion of the 2010s. It launched in January 2019, and its opening was met with controversy and boycotts within the machine learning research community due to opposition to Nature publishing the journal as closed access. To address this issue, now Nature Machine Intelligence gives authors an option to publish open access papers for an additional fee, and "authors remain owners of the research reported, and the code and data supporting the main findings of an article should be openly available. Moreover, preprints are allowed, in fact encouraged, and a link to the preprint can be added below the abstract, visible to all readers."

== Abstracting and indexing ==
According to the Journal Citation Reports, the journal has a 2021 impact factor of 25.898, ranking it 1st out of 144 journals in the category "Computer Science, Artificial intelligence" and first out of 113 journals in the category "Computer Science, Interdisciplinary Applications".
