= Nature Photonics =

Scientific journal on photonics

- Discipline: Photonics
- Language: English
- Edited by: Oliver Graydon and Rachel Pei Chin Won

Publication details
- History: 2007-present
- Publisher: Nature Publishing Group (United Kingdom)
- Frequency: Monthly
- Impact factor: 38.1 (2025)

Standard abbreviations
- ISO 4: Nat. Photonics

Indexing
- ISSN: 1749-4885 (print); 1749-4893 (web)
- LCCN: 2007212985
- OCLC no.: 78160603

Links
- Journal homepage

Nature Photonics is a peer-reviewed scientific journal published by the Nature Publishing Group. The editor-in-chief is Oliver Graydon. The journal covers research related to optoelectronics, laser science, imaging, communications, and other aspects of photonics and was established in January 2007. Nature Photonics publishes review articles, research papers, News and Views pieces, and research highlights summarizing the latest scientific findings in optoelectronics. This is complemented by a mix of articles dedicated to the business side of the industry covering areas such as technology commercialization and market analysis. The papers that have been published in this journal are internationally acclaimed for maintaining high research standards. The journal is regarded as top-ranking in the field of photonics.

Nature Photonics is indexed in the NASA Astrophysics Data System and Science Citation Index.
