= Nature Computational Science =

Scientific journal

- Discipline: Computational science
- Language: English
- Edited by: Fernando Chirigati

Publication details
- History: 2021—present
- Publisher: Nature Portfolio (subsidiary of Springer Nature)
- Frequency: Monthly
- Impact factor: 18.3 (2024)

Standard abbreviations
- ISO 4: Nat. Comput. Sci.

Indexing
- CODEN: NCSACD
- ISSN: 2662-8457

Links
- Journal homepage; Online access; Online archive

Nature Computational Science is a peer-reviewed scientific journal published monthly by Nature Portfolio. Established in 2021, it covers research on the development and use of computational techniques and mathematical models. Its current editor-in-chief is Fernando Chirigati.

== Abstracting and indexing ==
The journal is abstracted and indexed in:

- Current Contents/Engineering, Computing & Technology
- Current Contents/Physical, Chemical & Earth Sciences
- Ei Compendex
- MEDLINE
- Science Citation Index Expanded
- Scopus

According to the Journal Citation Reports, the journal has a 2024 impact factor of 18.3.
