= Nature Reviews Clinical Oncology =

- Discipline: Oncology
- Language: English
- Edited by: Diana Romero

Publication details
- Former name(s): Nature Clinical Practice Oncology
- History: 2004–present
- Publisher: Nature Portfolio
- Frequency: Monthly
- Impact factor: 65.011 (2021)

Standard abbreviations
- ISO 4: Nat. Rev. Clin. Oncol.

Indexing
- CODEN: NRCOAA
- ISSN: 1759-4774 (print); 1759-4782 (web)
- OCLC no.: 416086382

Links
- Journal homepage; Online archive

Nature Reviews Clinical Oncology is a monthly peer-reviewed academic journal published by Nature Portfolio. The journal was renamed from Nature Clinical Practice Oncology in April 2009. Nature Reviews Clinical Oncology is one of eight Clinical Review journals published by Nature Portfolio. It covers research developments and clinical practice in oncology. The editor-in-chief is Diana Romero.

== Abstracting and indexing ==
The journal is abstracted and indexed in:

- PubMed/MEDLINE
- Science Citation Index Expanded
- Scopus

According to the Journal Citation Reports, the journal has a 2021 impact factor of 65.011, ranking it 3rd out of 245 journals in the category "oncology".
