= Nature Reviews Disease Primers =

- Discipline: Medicine
- Language: English
- Edited by: Clemens Thoma

Publication details
- History: 2015–present
- Publisher: Nature Portfolio
- Frequency: Continuous
- Impact factor: 81.5 (2022)

Standard abbreviations
- ISO 4: Nat. Rev. Dis. Primers

Indexing
- ISSN: 2056-676X
- LCCN: 2016247750
- OCLC no.: 927001897

Links
- Journal homepage; Online archive

Nature Reviews Disease Primers is a peer-reviewed medical journal published by Nature Portfolio. It was established in 2015. The editor-in-chief is Clemens Thoma. The journal publishes broad review articles about disease areas, offering a global overview of the field and outlining "key open research questions". Each "Primer" is accompanied by a "PrimeView" summary poster containing accessible artwork and highlighting key points from the review. The journal's five-year anniversary was celebrated in April 2020, and noted that 225 primers had been published on medical topics.

== Abstracting and indexing ==
The journal is abstracted and indexed in Index Medicus/MEDLINE/PubMed.

According to the Journal Citation Reports, the journal has a 2022 impact factor of 81.5.
