= International Journal of Obesity =

- Discipline: Nutrition, dietetics
- Language: English
- Edited by: R.L. Atkinson, I. Macdonald

Publication details
- Former names: International Journal of Obesity; International Journal of Obesity and Related Metabolic Disorders
- History: 1977–present
- Publisher: Nature Publishing Group
- Frequency: Monthly
- Open access: Hybrid
- Impact factor: 5.095 (2020)

Standard abbreviations
- ISO 4: Int. J. Obes. (Lond.)

Indexing
- ISSN: 0307-0565 (print); 1476-5497 (web)
- LCCN: 2005243855
- OCLC no.: 26074170

Links
- Journal homepage; Online archive

The International Journal of Obesity (abbreviated as IJO) is a peer-reviewed medical journal published by the Nature Publishing Group. It was established in 1977 as International Journal of Obesity by Newman Pub. in collaboration with the Association for the Study of Obesity and the North American Association for the Study of Obesity. In 1992, the journal change its name to International Journal of Obesity and Related Metabolic Disorders upon acquisition by the Nature Publishing Group. In 2005, the journal returned to its original name.

== Aims and scope ==
The journal addresses the development and treatment of obesity, and the functional impairments associated with the obese state. It publishes basic science and clinical studies that address the biochemical, epidemiological, genetical, molecular, metabolic, nutritional, physiological, psychological and sociological aspects of obesity.

== Abstracting and indexing ==
International Journal of Obesity is indexed in the following databases:

- Elsevier BIOBASE
- BIOSIS
- Chemical Abstracts
- CINAHL
- Current Contents/Clinical Medicine
- Current Contents/Life Sciences
- EMBASE
- MEDLINE
- SciSearch

According to the Journal Citation Reports, the journal had a 2020 impact factor of 5.095, ranking it 23rd out of 89 journals in the category "Nutrition & Dietetics" and 38th out of 145 journals in the category "Endocrinology & Metabolism".

== See also ==
- List of medical journals
