= Cell Discovery =

- Discipline: Cell biology, Molecular biology
- Language: English
- Edited by: Lin Li

Publication details
- History: 2015–present
- Publisher: Springer Nature (United Kingdom)
- Frequency: Continuous
- Open access: Yes
- License: Creative Commons Attribution License
- Impact factor: 12.5 (2024)

Standard abbreviations
- ISO 4: Cell Discov.

Indexing
- ISSN: 2056-5968
- OCLC no.: 915037241

Links
- Journal homepage

Cell Discovery is a peer-reviewed open-access scientific journal covering research in cell biology and molecular biology. It is published continuously by Springer Nature with the Chinese Academy of Sciences Center for Excellence in Molecular Cell Science. The journal was established in 2015 as a sister journal to Cell Research. The Editor-in-Chief is Lin Li from Chinese Academy of Sciences.

The journal publishes original research articles, reviews, and reports on topics such as gene expression, cell signaling, development, and disease mechanisms.

== Abstracting and indexing ==
The journal is indexed in major bibliographic databases, including:

- Science Citation Index Expanded (Clarivate)
- Scopus
- DOAJ
- EMBASE
- MEDLINE
- BIOSIS

According to the Journal Citation Reports, the journal has a 2024 impact factor of 12.5.
