= Journal of Human Hypertension =

- Discipline: Cardiology
- Language: English
- Edited by: Michael Stowasser

Publication details
- History: 1987-present
- Publisher: Nature Publishing Group
- Frequency: Monthly
- Impact factor: 3.012 (2020)

Standard abbreviations
- ISO 4: J. Hum. Hypertens.

Indexing
- CODEN: JHHYE
- ISSN: 0950-9240 (print); 1476-5527 (web)
- LCCN: 89656504
- OCLC no.: 18713785

Links
- Journal homepage; Online archive

The Journal of Human Hypertension is a monthly peer-reviewed medical journal covering research into hypertension. It was established in 1987 and is published by Nature Publishing Group. The editor-in-chief is Michael Stowasser (University of Queensland). According to the Journal Citation Reports, the journal had a 2020 impact factor of 3.012, ranking it 33rd out of 65 journals in the category "Peripheral Vascular Disease".
