= Bone Marrow Transplantation (journal) =

Peer-reviewed medical journal published by Nature Research

- Discipline: Hematology, oncology
- Language: English
- Edited by: Hillard M. Lazarus and Mohamad Mohty

Publication details
- History: 1986–present
- Publisher: Nature Research
- Frequency: Monthly
- Impact factor: 5.483 (2020)

Standard abbreviations
- ISO 4: Bone Marrow Transplant.

Indexing
- CODEN: BMTRE9
- ISSN: 0268-3369 (print); 1476-5365 (web)
- OCLC no.: 14220154

Links
- Journal homepage; Online archive

Bone Marrow Transplantation is a peer-reviewed medical journal covering transplantation of bone marrow in humans. It is published monthly by Nature Research. The scope of the journal includes stem cell biology, transplantation immunology, translational research, and clinical results of specific transplant protocols.

According to the Journal Citation Reports, Bone Marrow Transplantation has a 2020 impact factor of 5.483.

== Abstracting and indexing ==
Bone Marrow Transplantation is abstracted and indexed in BIOBASE/Current Awareness in Biological Sciences, BIOSIS, Current Contents/Clinical Medicine, Current Contents/Life Sciences, EMBASE/Excerpta Medica, MEDLINE/Index Medicus, and Science Citation Index.
