= Jean-Pierre Boissel =

French researcher

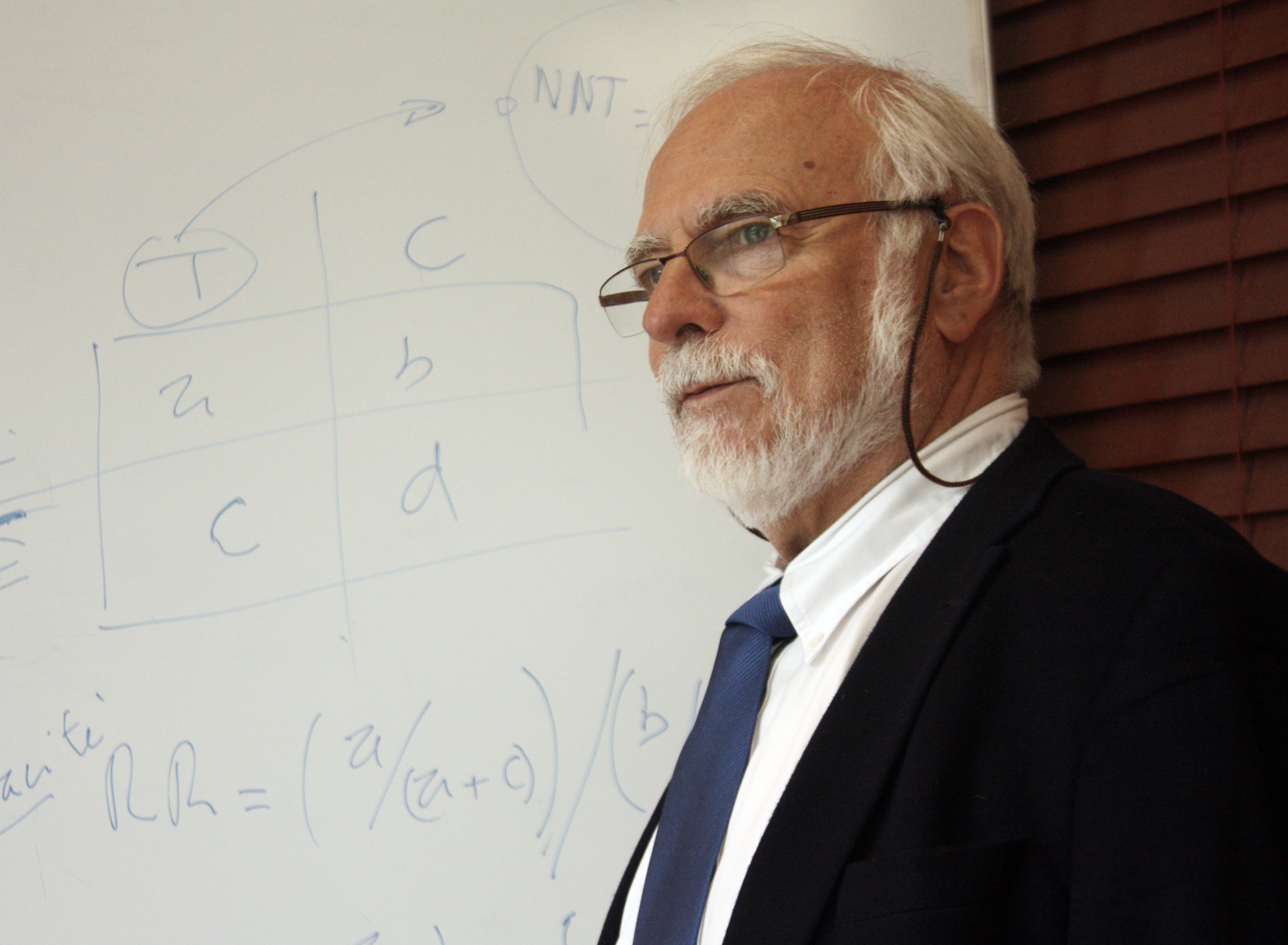
- Pr. Jean-Pierre Boissel
- Born: July 20, 1939; France
- Known for: Effect Model law, Meta-analysis, Clinical trial methodology
- Awards: Officier des Palmes Académiques, Chevalier de l'Ordre National du Mérite
- Scientific career
- Fields: Systems medicine, Pharmacology, Cardiology
- Institutions: Novadiscovery

Jean-Pierre Boissel (born July 20, 1939) is the co-founder and Chief Scientific Officer of Novadiscovery. He is an internationally recognized researcher in the field of therapeutic evaluation, cardiology and systems medicine. Emeritus Professor of Clinical Pharmacology, he is considered one of the founding fathers of systems medicine alongside Prof. Leroy Hood (US), Prof. Denis Noble (UK) and Prof. Charles Auffray (France).

== History ==
Author of over 300 articles in peer-reviewed journals, Jean-Pierre Boissel has, throughout his career, formulated and contributed to the implementation of innovative solutions to many a scientific and methodological hurdle healthcare players are customarily faced with. In the 1970s, he designed and directed the first randomized multicenter clinical trial with a control group in France in cardiology for the assessment of aspirin in secondary prevention. During the same period, he sets up the first European lab mastering animal and human arterial smooth muscle cell line culture.

A decade later, he convinced Jacques Delors, then President of the European Commission, to fund a clinical trial of early thrombolysis in patients suspected to develop an acute myocardial infarction, at home or in the ambulance. He got the Soviet Union to participate in this trial, which would be a double first: the first randomized double blind clinical trial supported by the European Commission and the first in the USSR. Among the innovations applied during this trial, a mini-“computer” used onboard ambulances to enable randomization of and allocation of compared treatments to patients. With the emergence of the French "Minitel" in the 1980s, he uses this tool to capture and control on-site data collected by physicians involved in clinical trials.

He directly contributes to the establishment of the standard in methodological design and implementation of clinical trials, pushing for the establishment of double blind randomized trials with control groups as the gold standard.

Faced with the exponential increase in biomedical knowledge, he proved existing systems to transfer knowledge from bench to bedside wholly inadequate. He publishes the first French work in this area in 1980, funded by INSERM. He therefore researches methodological approaches to address this issue. On the subject of knowledge transfer, well before the term "translational" research was coined, he sets up and leads a European project funded by DG XII. He summarizes the results of this work in a collaborative book called "Information thérapeutique", which lays the foundations for personalized medicine.

One of the pioneers in meta-analyses to evaluate therapeutic efficacy, he was the first to demonstrate the efficacy of an anti-aggregating agent, ticlopidine, to prevent clinical events in patients with lower-limb atherosclerosis. This demonstration led to the development of clopidogrel by the French pharmaceutical company Sanofi.

He was approached in the late 1980s by the French Ministry of Research to "spin off" a portion of his academic research unit, well before the creation of technology transfer offices. The resulting company, RCTs SA, is the first academic spinoff in France and one of the first CROs in Europe. RTCs currently employs forty full-time employees.

In 1999, he is appointed Chief Scientific Officer to the Director General of the National Institute of Health and Medical Research (Inserm), responsible for Therapeutic Research, a position he holds until 2001. He then becomes special advisor to the new Head of Inserm and focuses on rare diseases, clinical trials and biological resources centers. During his time with Inserm, he launches several programs with the support of the CNRS and the French Ministry of Research, including one designed to identify tools created by researchers for their needs and that could be industrialized.

He was also advisor to the Director of Health from 1995 to 1998. He represents France at the European Commission during the preparatory sessions of the 5th Framework Program for Research and Development. He is also president of the "Quality of Life and Living Resources Program Impact Committee", European Commission (1999-2003). From 2004 to 2011, he is a member of the Public Health Impact group at the French “Haute Autorité de Santé” (HAS).

He founded a second company in 1998, ClinInfo, which provides data management solutions for clinical trials. The company currently has a dozen employees and a branch in the United States.

In the 1990s, confronted with the ever-decreasing number of new drugs introduced on the market at a time when biomedical knowledge produced and widely available in the scientific literature grows at an exponential pace, Boissel decided to address the central question of the productivity of pharmaceutical R&D. He made the assumption that only the formal mathematical language can ensure the optimal use of available knowledge to describe the different biological mechanisms involved in the development and treatment of a disease. He discovered the Effect Model law, which is central to the approach developed by Novadiscovery.

In 2004, he founded the Institute for Theoretical Medicine to lay the conceptual foundations for what he calls systems pathophysiology, an extension on systems biology, which incorporates all the levels of life organization from genes to populations.

He has also been involved in the management of ethical issues in medicine and medical research. He has been active in several ethical boards. He fostered the concept of registration of clinical trials. Since 2009, he chairs the International Agency for Research on Cancer (IARC) Ethical Committee. Boissel has also been policy representative for the French Ministry of Foreign Affairs in Iran, Afghanistan and Bolivia.
