= Npj 2D Materials and Applications =

npj 2D Materials and Applications
- Discipline: materials science
- Language: English
- Edited by: Andras Kis

Publication details
- Publisher: Nature Publishing Group
- Impact factor: 8.8 (2024)

Standard abbreviations
- ISO 4: npj 2D Mater. Appl.

Indexing
- ISSN: 2397-7132

Links
- Journal homepage

npj 2D Materials and Applications, is an open access peer-reviewed scientific journal published by Nature Publishing Group. It focuses on 2D materials (such as thin films), including fundamental behaviour, synthesis, properties and applications. The current editor-in-chief is Andras Kis (École Polytechnique Fédérale de Lausanne).

== Scope ==
npj 2D Materials and Applications publishes articles, brief communication, comment, matters arising, perspective, and editorial on 2D materials in their entirety, including fundamental behaviour, synthesis, properties and applications. Specific materials of interest will include, but are not limited to:

- 2D materials in all their forms: graphene, transition metal dichalcogenides, phosphorene and molecular systems, including relevant allotropes and compounds, and topological materials
- fundamental understanding of their basic science
- synthesis by physical and chemical approaches
- behavior and properties: electronic, magnetic, spintronic, photonic, mechanical, including in heterostructures and other architectures
- applications: sensors, memory, high-frequency electronics, energy harvesting and storage, flexible electronics, water treatment, biomedical, thermal management.
