= Cell Research =

Chinese scientific journal

- Discipline: Cell biology
- Language: English
- Edited by: Gang Pei and Dangsheng Li

Publication details
- History: 1990-present
- Publisher: Nature Publishing Group on behalf of the Shanghai Institutes for Biological Sciences
- Frequency: Monthly
- Open access: Hybrid
- Impact factor: 25.7 (2024)

Standard abbreviations
- ISO 4: Cell Res.

Indexing
- CODEN: CREEB6
- ISSN: 1001-0602 (print); 1748-7838 (web)
- LCCN: sn96039534
- OCLC no.: 52535380

Links
- Journal homepage; Online archive; Journal page at publisher's website

Cell Research is a monthly peer-reviewed scientific journal covering cell biology. It is published by the Nature Research on behalf of the Shanghai Institutes for Biological Sciences (Chinese Academy of Sciences) and is affiliated with the Chinese Society for Cell Biology. It was established in 1990. The editor-in-chief is Gang Pei (Shanghai Institutes for Biological Sciences), and the deputy editor-in-chief is Dangsheng Li (Shanghai Institutes for Biological Sciences). The journal Cell Discovery was established in 2015 as a sister journal to Cell Research.

== Abstracting and indexing ==
The journal is abstracted and indexed in:

- Index Medicus/MEDLINE/PubMed
- Science Citation Index
- Current Contents/Life Sciences
- Chemical Abstracts
- BIOSIS Previews
- VINITI Database RAS

According to the Journal Citation Reports, Cell Research has a 2021 impact factor of 46.297.
