= Nature Reviews Molecular Cell Biology =

- Discipline: Molecular biology, Cell biology
- Language: English
- Edited by: Kim Baumann

Publication details
- History: 2000–present
- Publisher: Nature Portfolio
- Frequency: Monthly
- Impact factor: 118.0 (2025)

Standard abbreviations
- ISO 4: Nat. Rev. Mol. Cell Biol.

Indexing
- CODEN: NRMCBP
- ISSN: 1471-0072 (print); 1471-0080 (web)
- LCCN: 2001229974
- OCLC no.: 807916556

Links
- Journal homepage; Online access; Online archive

Nature Reviews Molecular Cell Biology is a monthly peer-reviewed review journal published by Nature Portfolio. It was established in October 2000 and covers all aspects of molecular and cell biology. The editor-in-chief is Kim Baumann.

According to the Journal Citation Reports, the journal has a 2025 impact factor of 118.0, ranking it 1st out of 194 journals in the category "Cell Biology".
