= Cancer Gene Therapy =

- Discipline: Oncology, gene therapy, cell therapy
- Language: English
- Edited by: Leandro Castellano

Publication details
- History: 1994–present
- Publisher: Nature Portfolio (United Kingdom)
- Frequency: Monthly
- Open access: Hybrid
- Impact factor: 6.4 (2025)

Standard abbreviations
- ISO 4: Cancer Gene Ther.

Indexing
- ISSN: 0929-1903 (print); 1476-5500 (web)

Links
- Journal homepage; Online access; Online archive

Cancer Gene Therapy is a monthly peer-reviewed medical journal covering the use of gene therapy and cell therapy in cancer research and treatment. It is published by Nature Portfolio and was established in 1994. The editor-in-chief is Leandro Castellano.

The journal publishes laboratory and clinical research papers, review articles, brief communications, case reports, industry perspectives, and letters. Its scope includes gene-transfer technologies, viral and non-viral delivery systems, RNA interference, cancer vaccines, tumor immunology, immunotherapy, cellular therapies, cancer stem cells, tumor-suppressor genes, drug resistance, apoptosis, and DNA synthesis and repair.

== Abstracting and indexing ==
The journal is abstracted and indexed in:

- BIOSIS Previews
- MEDLINE (United States National Library of Medicine)
- Pharma Collection (ProQuest)
- Science Citation Index
- Science Citation Index Expanded
- Scopus

According to the Journal Citation Reports, the journal has a 2025 impact factor of 6.4.
