= Kim Baumann =

British biologist

Kim Baumann is a British biologist and the editor in chief of Nature Reviews Molecular Cell Biology.

== Education ==
Baumann completed her PhD and postdoctoral research on plant development at the John Innes Centre in Norwich, UK. She previously studied at the University of Natural Resources and Life Sciences, Vienna.

== Career ==
Baumann was part of the team that set up the Sainsbury Laboratory, before working as the editor for Cell Migration Gateway academic journal.

She joined Nature Reviews Molecular Cell Biology in 2009 and has been the editor in chief since 2016.

== Selected publications ==
- Baumann, Kim, et al. The DNA binding site of the Dof protein NtBBF1 is essential for tissue-specific and auxin-regulated expression of the rolB oncogene in plants, The Plant Cell 11.3 (1999): 323-333.
- Baumann, Kim, et al. Control of cell and petal morphogenesis by R2R3 MYB transcription factors, Development, (2007): 1691-1701.

== Personal life ==
Baumann lives in London, UK.
