= David Kerr (oncologist) =

British cancer researcher (born 1956)

David James Kerr CBE, MA MD DSc FRCP (Glas & Lon) FRCGP (Hon) FMedSci
- Born: 1956 (age 69–70); Glasgow, Scotland
- Education: University of Glasgow –DSC (1996) PhD (1990) MSc (1990) MD (1987), MBChB (1980) BScBiochemistry (1977) = University of Oxford - MA (2002)
- Years active: 1992-present
- Known for: Research and Treatment of colorectal cancer; Gene Therapy
- Medical career
- Profession: Medical Doctor, researcher
- Field: Oncology
- Institutions: Oxford University
- Research: Colorectal Cancer, Gene Therapy
- Awards: Distinguished Harvard Global Health Catalyst Award (2017); Honorary Fellowship of the Royal College of General Practitioners (2007); European Society for Medical Oncology Award(2006); Commander of the Order of the British Empire (2002); NHS Nye Bevan Award for Innovation (2000); European School of Oncology International Award for outstanding contribution to chemotherapy research (1987)

Professor David James Kerr CBE (born 1956, Glasgow) is a British Cancer Researcher. His primary area of research is treatment and management of colorectal cancer.

He served as Chief Research Advisor at Sidra Medical and Research Center in Doha, Qatar. David James Kerr is Professor of Cancer Medicine and Former Fellow of Corpus Christi College, Oxford. He was also President-Elect for European Society for Medical Oncology (2009).

David James Kerr’s clinical research into adjuvant therapy of early-stage colorectal cancer has contributed to saving thousands of lives over the past two decades.

== Early life and education ==
Kerr was born in 1956 in Glasgow. He attended Dunard Street Primary School, Maryhill, and Eastwood High Secondary School. Knowing from a relatively early age that he wanted to become a doctor having read A. J. Cronin's The Citadel as a child, he went on to study biochemistry and medicine at Glasgow University, and subsequently became an ontological clinical scientist following specialist and fellowship training within the Department of Medical Oncology at the University of Glasgow under Professor S. Kaye (1984–1992).

== Career ==
Beginning in March 1992, Kerr served as Professor of Clinical Oncology at the University of Birmingham and Director of the Clinical Trials Unit where he and Professor Alan Rickinson built the Institute of Cancer Studies.

In 1994, he was appointed Clinical Director of the Regional Cancer Task Force for the West Midlands. There, he developed a "hub and spoke" Network model for cancer services in the region. The key elements of the plan are:

- Site specialization by cancer surgeons and oncologists
- Multidisciplinary working
- Development of regional treatment guidelines (often precursor of national guidelines)
- Use of IT as a social glue to bind the network together.

He undertook the first national audit of cancer waiting times for Sir Kenneth Calman, who was then Chief Medical Officer which was one of the drivers which led to the Government creating a National Cancer Plan.

In 2001, he was appointed Rhodes Professor of Clinical pharmacology and Cancer Therapeutics and Head of the Department of Clinical Pharmacology at the University of Oxford. At the same time, he was also asked by the Secretary of State for Health Alan Milburn to undertake a review of NHS research strategy into cancer. The resultant blueprint for the provision of infrastructure to support clinical cancer research in the UK led to the establishment of the NHS Cancer Research Network (NCRN) and the National Translational Cancer Research Network (NTRAC). Kerr was subsequently appointed the Director of NTRAC.

He subsequently worked with colleagues to build an Institute of Cancer Medicine and Cancer Treatment Center in Oxford.

In 2004, Kerr was invited by Scotland’s First Minister to chair the work of a National Framework Advisory Group to consider the future shape of the NHS in Scotland. This Group produced three volumes of work, "Building a Health Service Fit for the Future" (Vol I and II) and a web-based data link showing the Reports from the individual action teams. This has been adopted as the blueprint for Scotland’s NHS over the next 20 years.

In 2009, David Kerr took a leave of absence from Oxford University to become the Chief Research Advisor at the Sidra Medical and Research Center. In April 2009, he became a member of the Supreme Council of Health.

He has brought worldwide attention to the looming epidemic of cancer which is a risk of claiming the lives of more than a million Africans every year. He organized the first ever African Cancer Reform convention in London (2007). This was attended by 27 African Health ministries, led to the London Declaration calling for immediate action to develop cancer control plans for these nations. Subsequently Kerr was asked by African ministers to lead a new organization, AfrOx to aid national cancer planning in Africa. AfrOx has already received international support (WHO, IAEA) and is seen as a beacon to establish cancer care in Africa. He has completed a National Cancer Plan for Ghana, has been invited by the governments of Rwanda, Nigeria and Sierra Leone to lead their cancer plan activities, has initiated a mass vaccination program for cervical cancer, the commonest cancer affecting African women, and is coordinating the International Oncology Association's engagement in this field.

Kerr spoke at a New Frontiers in Science Diplomacy event and blogged on the Guardian about it.

== Published works ==
Kerr has published over 350 papers in peer reviewed journals. His primary areas of research are colorectal cancer and gene therapy. He has been awarded several patents which have led to spin out biotech companies – Cobra Therapeutics, Oxford Cancer Biomarkers, and Celleron Therapeutics.

He sits on a number of general editorial boards including Nature Reviews Clinical Oncology journal.

== Awards and honours ==
- 1987: European School of Oncology International Award for outstanding contribution to chemotherapy research
- 1995: Fellow of the Royal College of Physicians and Surgeons, Glasgow
- 1996: Fellow of the Royal College of Physicians, London
- 1999: 2nd International Prize for Excellence in the field of Colorectal Cancer Research and Treatment – Awarded by International Drug Development Centre and European Association for Research into Gastrointestinal Cancer
- 2000: Fellow of the Academy of Medical Sciences
- 2000: NHS Nye Bevan Award for Innovation
- 2001 : Elected Fellow of Academy of Medical Sciences
- 2002: Appointed Commander of the Order of the British Empire for services to cancer research
- 2006: European Society for Medical Oncology Award for distinguished contribution to cancer therapy and research in Europe
- 2006: Distinguished Medieval Lecture, University of Manchester
- 2007: Honorary Fellowship of the Royal College of General Practitioners
- 2007: Fulton Lecture, University of Glasgow
- 2008: Bruce Cain Memorial Lecture, Cancer Societies of Australia and New Zealand
- 2009 : Elected Founding Fellow of European Academy of Cancer Scientists
- 2010 : Elected Felloe of Royal College of Physicians, Edinburgh
- 2017: Distinguished Harvard Global Health Catalyst Award, Boston, USA
