= Nature Plants =

Academic journal

- Discipline: Botany
- Language: English
- Edited by: Chris Surridge

Publication details
- History: 2015–present
- Publisher: Nature Publishing Group
- Frequency: Monthly
- Impact factor: 13.2 (2024)

Standard abbreviations
- ISO 4: Nat. Plants

Indexing
- ISSN: 2055-0278
- OCLC no.: 964863802

Links
- Journal homepage; Online access; Online archive

Nature Plants is a monthly peer-reviewed online-only scientific journal covering all aspects of plants and plant biology. It was established in 2015 and is published by Nature Publishing Group. The editor-in-chief is Chris Surridge. According to the Journal Citation Reports, the journal has a 2024 impact factor of 13.2.
