= Mucosal Immunology (journal) =

- Discipline: Immunology
- Language: English
- Edited by: Ben Marsland

Publication details
- Publisher: Nature Publishing Group
- Impact factor: 7.313 (2020)

Standard abbreviations
- ISO 4: Mucosal Immunol.

Indexing
- ISSN: 1933-0219 (print); 1935-3456 (web)

Links
- Journal homepage

Mucosal Immunology is the official publication of the Society for Mucosal Immunology (SMI).

It aims to provide a forum for both basic and clinical scientists to discuss all aspects of immunity and inflammation involving mucosal tissues. The journal reflects the interests of scientists studying gastrointestinal, pulmonary, nasopharyngeal, oral, ocular, and genitourinary immunology through the publication of original research articles, scholarly reviews, and timely commentaries, editorials and letters. Publication of basic, translational, and clinical studies will all be given equal consideration.

In addition, the journal publishes news items concerning its sponsoring society.

According to the Journal Citation Reports, the journal has a 2020 impact factor of 7.313, ranking it 30th out of 162 journals in the category "Immunology".

== Current editors ==
- Ben Marsland, editor-in-chief
- Nadine Cerf-Bensussan, deputy editor
- Gérard Eberl, deputy editor
- Clare Lloyd, deputy editor
- Kathy McCoy, deputy editor
- Gregory F. Sonnenberg, deputy editor

The journal was published by Nature Publishing Group, on behalf of the Society from January 2008.
