= Nature Reviews Endocrinology =

- Discipline: Endocrinology
- Language: English
- Edited by: Claire Greenhill

Publication details
- Former name(s): Nature Clinical Practice Endocrinology & Metabolism
- History: 2005–present
- Publisher: Nature Portfolio
- Frequency: Monthly
- Impact factor: 47.564 (2021)

Standard abbreviations
- ISO 4: Nat. Rev. Endocrinol.

Indexing
- CODEN: NREABD
- ISSN: 1759-5029 (print); 1759-5037 (web)
- OCLC no.: 317573463

Links
- Journal homepage; Online archive

Nature Reviews Endocrinology is a monthly peer-reviewed medical journal published by Nature Portfolio. It covers all aspects of endocrinology. The journal was established in 2005 as Nature Clinical Practice Endocrinology & Metabolism and obtained its current title in April 2009. The editor-in-chief is Claire Greenhill.

According to the Journal Citation Reports, the journal has a 2021 impact factor of 47.564, ranking it 1st out of 146 journals in the category "Endocrinology & Metabolism".
