= Nature Reviews Urology =

- Discipline: Urology
- Language: English
- Edited by: Annette Fenner

Publication details
- Former name(s): Nature Clinical Practice Urology
- History: 2004–present
- Publisher: Nature Portfolio (UK)
- Frequency: Monthly
- Impact factor: 16.430 (2021)

Standard abbreviations
- ISO 4: Nat. Rev. Urol.

Indexing
- CODEN: NRNADQ
- ISSN: 1759-4812 (print); 1759-4820 (web)
- OCLC no.: 318124628

Links
- Journal homepage; Online access; Online archive

Nature Reviews Urology is a monthly peer-reviewed medical journal published by Nature Portfolio. It covers all aspects of urology. The journal was established in 2004 as Nature Clinical Practice Urology and obtained its current title in April 2009. The editor-in-chief is Annette Fenner.

According to the Journal Citation Reports, the journal has a 2021 impact factor of 16.430, ranking it 4th out of 90 journals in the category "Urology & Nephrology".
