= Nature India =

- Categories: Interdisciplinary
- Frequency: Weekly
- Publisher: Nature Publishing Group
- First issue: February 2008
- Country: UK
- Website: www.nature.com/nindia/index.html
- ISSN: 1755-3180

Nature India is an online publication by Nature Publishing Group (NPG) that highlights research being produced in India in science and medicine. The international website was launched in February 2008.

== Aims and scope ==
The aim of Nature India is to give scientists and professionals an insight into the latest research from India. Each week, the editors survey scientific journals (both in English and in Indian languages) to identify the best recently published papers from India. Unlike other Nature Publishing Group journals, Nature India posts only research highlights (200-word summaries) that explain the importance of the latest scientific findings in the country.

The website covers topics including:

- Astronomy
- Biotechnology
- Cell and molecular Biology
- Chemistry
- Clinical medicine
- Developmental biology
- Earth
- Environment
- Ecology
- Evolution
- Genetics
- Materials
- Neuroscience
- Physics
- Space
