= Journal of Perinatology =

- Discipline: Perinatology
- Language: English
- Edited by: Patrick G. Gallagher

Publication details
- Former name(s): Journal of the California Perinatal Association
- History: 1981–present
- Publisher: Nature Publishing Group
- Frequency: Monthly
- Impact factor: 2.4 (2023)

Standard abbreviations
- ISO 4: J. Perinatol.

Indexing
- CODEN: JOPEEI
- ISSN: 0743-8346 (print); 1476-5543 (web)

Links
- Journal homepage; Online access; Online archive

The Journal of Perinatology is a monthly peer-reviewed medical journal covering perinatology. It was established in 1981 as the Journal of the California Perinatal Association, obtaining its current name in 1984. It is published by Nature Publishing Group on behalf of the California Perinatal Association, of which it is the official journal. The editor-in-chief is Edward E. Lawson (Johns Hopkins Hospital). According to the Journal Citation Reports, the journal has a 2023 impact factor of 2.4.
