= Nature Reviews Methods Primers =

Scientific journal

- Discipline: Life sciences, physical sciences
- Language: English
- Edited by: Joseph Willson

Publication details
- History: 2021—present
- Publisher: Nature Portfolio
- Frequency: Continuous
- Impact factor: 56 (2024)

Standard abbreviations
- ISO 4: Nat. Rev. Methods Primers

Indexing
- CODEN: NRMPAT
- ISSN: 2662-8449 (print); 2662-8449 (web)

Links
- Journal homepage; Online access; Online archive

Nature Reviews Methods Primers is a peer-reviewed and online-only scientific journal published by Nature Portfolio. Established in 2021, it covers review articles on analytical, applied, statistical, theoretical and computational methods used in the life and physical sciences. As of 28 October 2025, its editor-in-chief is Joseph Willson.

== Abstracting and indexing ==
The journal is abstracted and indexed in:

- Chemical Abstracts Core
- Current Contents/Physical, Chemical & Earth Sciences
- Science Citation Index Expanded
- Scopus

According to the Journal Citation Reports, the journal has a 2024 impact factor of 56.
