= The Pharmacogenomics Journal =

- Discipline: Pharmacogenomics
- Language: English
- Edited by: George P. Patrinos

Publication details
- History: 2001-present
- Publisher: Nature Publishing Group
- Frequency: Quarterly
- Impact factor: 3.550 (2020)

Standard abbreviations
- ISO 4: Pharmacogenomics J.

Indexing
- CODEN: PJHOAZ
- ISSN: 1470-269X (print); 1473-1150 (web)
- LCCN: 2001243289
- OCLC no.: 49965587

Links
- Journal homepage; Online access; Online archive

The Pharmacogenomics Journal is a quarterly peer-reviewed medical journal covering pharmacogenomics. It was established in 2001 and is published by Nature Publishing Group. The editor-in-chief is George P. Patrinos (University of Patras). According to the Journal Citation Reports, the journal had a 2020 impact factor of 3.550.
