= Nature Reviews Materials =

- Discipline: Materials science
- Language: English
- Edited by: Giulia Pacchioni

Publication details
- History: 2016–present
- Publisher: Nature Portfolio
- Frequency: Monthly
- Impact factor: 76.679 (2021)

Standard abbreviations
- ISO 4: Nat. Rev. Mater.

Indexing
- CODEN: NRMADL
- ISSN: 2058-8437 (print); 2058-8437 (web)
- OCLC no.: 945677393

Links
- Journal homepage; Online archive

Nature Reviews Materials is a monthly peer-reviewed scientific journal published by Nature Portfolio. It was established in 2016. The journal covers all topics within materials science. It presents reviews and perspectives, which are commissioned by the editorial team. The editor-in-chief is Giulia Pacchioni.

According to the Journal Citation Reports, the journal has a 2021 impact factor of 76.679, ranking it 1st out of 345 journals in the category "Materials Science, Multidisciplinary" and 1st out of 109 journals in the category "Nanoscience & Nanotechnology".
