= Sang-Wook Cheong =

American materials scientist

Sang Wook Cheong
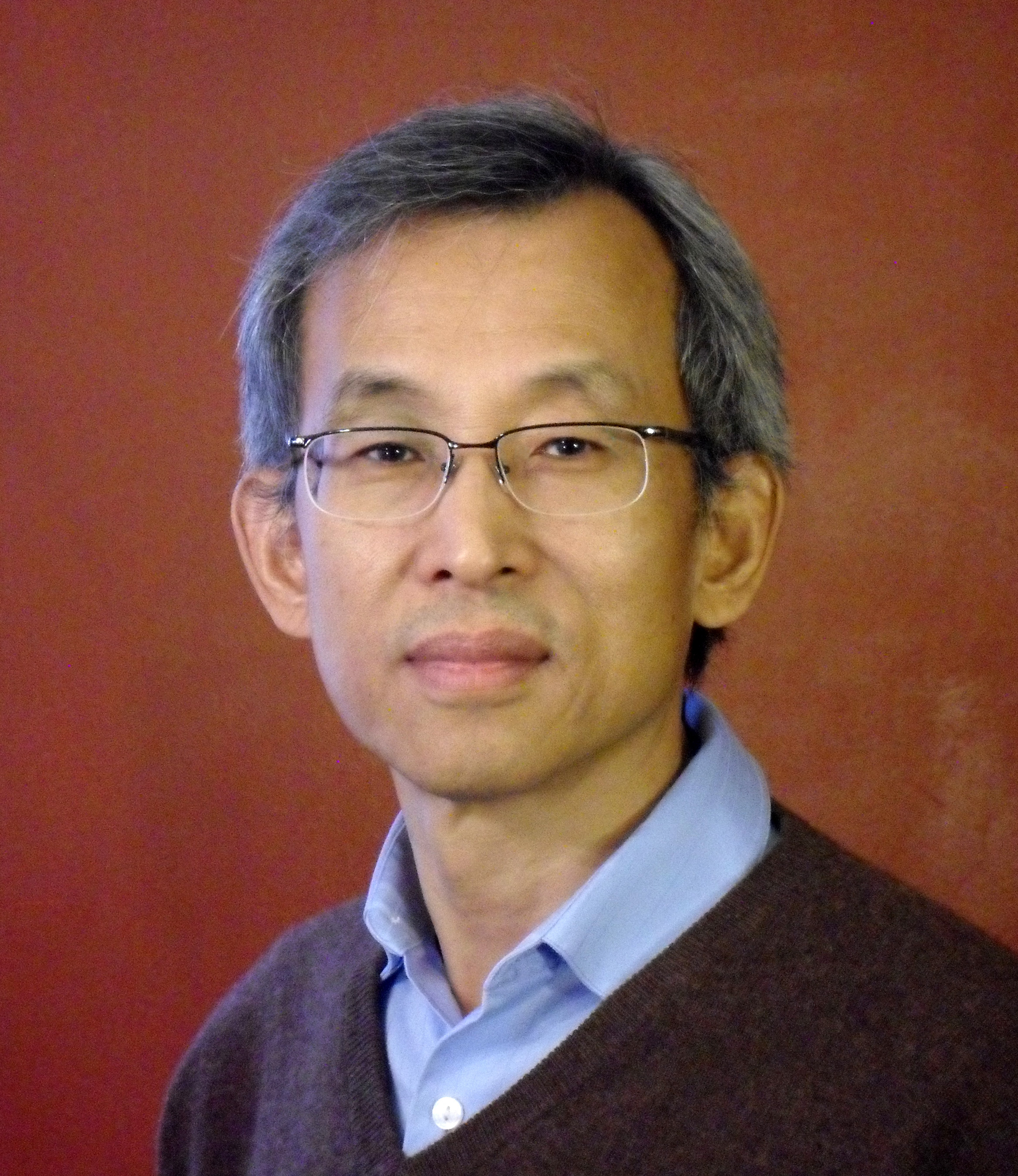
- Cheong in 2013
- Born: South Korea
- Education: University of California, Los Angeles
- Awards: Ho-am Prize in Science (2007); McGroddy Prize (2010)
- Scientific career
- Fields: Physics
- Workplaces: Board of Governors Professor, Rutgers University

Sang-Wook Cheong (Korean: 정상욱) is an American materials scientist at Rutgers University. He has made ground-breaking contributions to the research field of enhanced physical functionalities in complex materials originating from collective correlations and collective phase transitions such as colossal magnetoresistive and colossal magnetoelectric effects in complex oxides. He has also made pivotal contributions to mesoscopic self-organization in solids, including the nanoscale charge stripe formation, mesoscopic electronic phase separation in mixed valent transition metal oxides, and the formation of topological vortex domains in multiferroics, which was found to be synergistically relevant to mathematics (graph theory) and cosmology.

== Education ==
Cheong graduated in mathematics from Seoul National University in 1982 and then studied physics in the University of California, Los Angeles, graduating from there in 1989.

== Career ==
From 1986 to 1989 Cheong worked at the Los Alamos National Laboratory before joining AT&T Bell Laboratories. He was appointed as a professor at Rutgers University in 1997 and founded the Rutgers Center for Emergent Materials (RCEM) in 2005. He is currently the director of RCEM, a Board of Governors Professor at Rutgers, and a Distinguished Professor at Postech, Korea. His work on complex oxides has been recognized through various prizes, including the 2007 Ho-am Prize, the KBS 2009 Global Korean Award, and the 2010 James C. McGroddy Prize for New Materials.

He has published more than 600 scientific papers which have been cited more than 34,000 (six papers cited more than 1,000 times, and his h-index is 92). He was the 13th most cited physicist in the world in from 1993 to 2003.
