= Nature Chemistry =

- Discipline: Chemistry
- Language: English
- Edited by: Stuart Cantrill

Publication details
- History: 2009–present
- Publisher: Nature Portfolio
- Frequency: Monthly
- Open access: Hybrid
- Impact factor: 20.0 (2024)

Standard abbreviations
- ISO 4: Nat. Chem.

Indexing
- CODEN: NCAHBB
- ISSN: 1755-4330 (print); 1755-4349 (web)
- LCCN: 2009204055
- OCLC no.: 301715811

Links
- Journal homepage; Online archive

Nature Chemistry is a monthly peer-reviewed scientific journal published by Nature Portfolio. It was established in April 2009. The editor-in-chief is Gavin Armstrong. The journal covers all aspects of chemistry. Publishing formats include primary research articles, reviews, news, views, highlights of notable research from other journals, commentaries, book reviews, correspondence. Other formats are analysis of issues such as education, funding, policy, intellectual property, and the impact chemistry has on society.

== Abstracting and indexing ==
The journal is abstracted and indexed in:

- Chemical Abstracts Service
- Science Citation Index
- Current Contents/Physical, Chemical & Earth Sciences
- BIOSIS Previews

According to the Journal Citation Reports, the journal has a 2024 impact factor of 20.0.
