= Nature Water =

- Discipline: Water science, Hydrology, Environmental science, Water resources management
- Language: English

Publication details
- History: Since 2023
- Publisher: Springer Nature
- Frequency: Monthly
- Open access: Hybrid
- Impact factor: 24.1 (2024)
- ISO 4: Find out here

Indexing
- ISSN: 2731-6084

Links
- Journal homepage; Online access

Nature Water is a monthly peer-reviewed scientific journal covering research on water in natural and engineered systems, including physical, chemical, biological, social, and policy dimensions. It is published by Springer Nature and was established in 2023.

The journal publishes original research articles, reviews, perspectives, comments, and correspondence addressing topics such as the global water cycle, water quality and treatment, water–energy–food systems, climate–water interactions, aquatic ecosystems, and water governance and sustainability.

== Abstracting and indexing ==
The journal is abstracted and indexed in:

- Science Citation Index Expanded
- Scopus
- DOAJ

According to the Journal Citation Reports, the journal has a 2024 impact factor of 24.1.
