= Nature Reviews Gastroenterology & Hepatology =

- Discipline: Gastroenterology, hepatology
- Language: English
- Edited by: Katrina Ray

Publication details
- Former name(s): Nature Clinical Practice Gastroenterology & Hepatology
- History: 2004–present
- Publisher: Nature Portfolio
- Frequency: Monthly
- Impact factor: 73.082 (2021)

Standard abbreviations
- ISO 4: Nat. Rev. Gastroenterol. Hepatol.

Indexing
- CODEN: NRGHA9
- ISSN: 1759-5045 (print); 1759-5053 (web)
- OCLC no.: 730022551

Links
- Journal homepage; Online access; Online archive

Nature Reviews Gastroenterology & Hepatology is a peer-reviewed medical journal published by Nature Portfolio. It was established in 2004 as Nature Clinical Practice Gastroenterology & Hepatology and obtained its current title in April 2009. The editor-in-chief is Katrina Ray.

== Scope ==
The content includes editorial and opinion pieces, highlights from the current literature, commentaries on the application of recent research to practical patient care, reviews, and case studies. The scope includes pathology, diagnosis, and treatment of diseases of the gastrointestinal tract, liver, pancreas, gall bladder, and biliary tract, such as functional gastrointestinal disorders, inflammatory diseases, cancer, infection, and nutritional disorders.

== Abstracting and indexing ==
The journal is abstracted and indexed by:

- Index Medicus/MEDLINE
- PubMed
- EMBASE/Excerpta Medica
- Science Citation Index Expanded
- Current Contents/Clinical Medicine
- CINAHL
- CAB Abstracts
- Chemical Abstracts Service
- Scopus

According to the Journal Citation Reports, the journal has a 2021 impact factor of 73.082, ranking it 1st out of 93 journals in the category "Gastroenterology & Hepatology".
