= NSMB (mathematics) =

Numerical software

NSMB is a computer system for solving Navier–Stokes equations using the finite volume method. It supports meshes built of several blocks (multi-blocks) and supports parallelisation. The name stands for "Navier–Stokes multi-block". It was developed by a consortium of European scientific institutions and companies, between 1992 and 2003.
