= Nature Reviews Drug Discovery =

- Discipline: Pharmacology, Biotechnology
- Language: English
- Edited by: Peter Kirkpatrick

Publication details
- History: 2002–present
- Publisher: Nature Portfolio
- Frequency: Monthly
- Impact factor: 101.8 (2024)

Standard abbreviations
- ISO 4: Nat. Rev. Drug Discov.

Indexing
- CODEN: NRDDAG
- ISSN: 1474-1776 (print); 1474-1784 (web)
- LCCN: 2002243044
- OCLC no.: 427380493

Links
- Journal homepage; Online access; Online archive

Nature Reviews Drug Discovery is a monthly peer-reviewed review journal published by Nature Portfolio. It was established in 2002 and covers drug discovery and development. The editor-in-chief is Peter Kirkpatrick. According to the Journal Citation Reports, the journal has a 2021 impact factor of 112.288, ranking it 1st out of 158 journals in the category "Biotechnology & Applied Microbiology" and 1st out of 279 journals in the category "Pharmacology & Pharmacy".

Reviews are commissioned to specialists and supplemented with glossary explanations for non-specialist readers and illustrated with figures drawn by Nature's in-house art editors. Besides reviews, the journal publishes analysis articles based on existing datasets (e.g. metaanalysis), progress articles that focus on outstanding issues, and perspective articles—typically opinions or historical pieces.

== See also ==
- Nature Biotechnology
- Annual Review of Pharmacology and Toxicology
- Pharmacological Reviews
