= Nature Structural & Molecular Biology =

- Discipline: Structural biology, molecular biology
- Language: English
- Edited by: Carolina Perdigoto

Publication details
- Former name: Nature Structural Biology
- History: Nature Structural Biology (1994–2003); Nature Structural & Molecular Biology (2004–present)
- Publisher: Nature Publishing Group
- Frequency: Monthly
- Impact factor: 10.1 (2025)

Standard abbreviations
- ISO 4: Nat. Struct. Mol. Biol.

Indexing
- CODEN: NSMBCU
- ISSN: 1545-9993 (print); 1545-9985 (web)
- LCCN: 2003215440
- OCLC no.: 52847740

Links
- Journal homepage; Online access; Online archive

Nature Structural & Molecular Biology is a monthly peer-reviewed scientific journal publishing research articles, reviews, news, and commentaries in structural and molecular biology, with an emphasis on papers that further a "functional and mechanistic understanding of how molecular components in a biological process work together".

It is published by the Nature Portfolio and was established in 1994 under the title Nature Structural Biology, obtaining its current title in January 2004. Like other Nature journals, there is no external editorial board, with editorial decisions being made by an in-house team, although peer review by external expert referees forms a part of the review process.

According to the Journal Citation Reports, the journal had a 2025 impact factor of 10.1, ranking it 13th out of 298 journals in the category "Biochemistry & Molecular Biology", 1st out of 72 journals in the category "Biophysics", and 16th out of 195 journals in the category "Cell Biology".
