= Nature Biotechnology =

Peer-reviewed scientific journal

- Discipline: Biotechnology
- Language: English
- Edited by: Barbara Cheifet

Publication details
- Former name(s): Bio/Technology
- History: 1983–present
- Publisher: Nature Portfolio (UK)
- Frequency: Monthly
- Open access: Hybrid
- Impact factor: 33.1 (2023)

Standard abbreviations
- ISO 4: Nat. Biotechnol.

Indexing
- CODEN: NABIF9
- ISSN: 1087-0156 (print); 1546-1696 (web)
- LCCN: 96647227
- OCLC no.: 34160925

Links
- Journal homepage; Online archive

Nature Biotechnology is a monthly peer-reviewed scientific journal published by Nature Portfolio. The editor-in-chief is Barbara Cheifet who heads an in-house team of editors. The focus of the journal is biotechnology including research results and the commercial business sector of this field. Coverage includes the related biological, biomedical, agricultural and environmental sciences. Also of interest are the commercial, political, legal, and societal influences that affect this field.

The journal continues serial publication of the title "Bio/Technology", which had a publication period of 1983 to 1996.

== Abstracting and indexing ==
This journal is indexed in

- BIOBASE
- BIOSIS
- Chemical Abstracts Service
- CSA Illumina
- CAB Abstracts
- EMBASE
- Scopus
- Current Contents
- Science Citation Index
- Medline (PubMed)

According to the Journal Citation Reports, the journal has a 2023 impact factor of 33.1, ranking it 2nd out of 158 journals in the category "Biotechnology & Applied Microbiology".
