= Indexing and abstracting service =

Service that provides summaries and descriptions of documents

An abstracting service is a service that provides abstracts of publications, often on a subject or group of related subjects, usually on a subscription basis. An indexing service is a service that assigns descriptors and other kinds of access points to documents. The word indexing service is today mostly used for computer programs, but may also cover services providing back-of-the-book indexes, journal indexes, and related kinds of indexes. An indexing and abstracting service is a service that provides shortening or summarizing of documents and assigning of descriptors for referencing documents.

The product is often an abstracts journal or a bibliographic index, which may be a subject bibliography or a bibliographic database.

Guidelines for indexing and abstracting, including the evaluation of such services, are given in the literature of library and information science.

== See also ==
- Bibliography
- Citation index
- Guide to information sources
- List of academic databases and search engines
- Subject indexing
