= Nature Portfolio =

Scientific publishing company

- Parent company: Springer Nature
- Status: Active
- Founded: 1869 (Nature Journal)
- Founder: Norman Lockyer; Alexander Macmillan
- Country of origin: United Kingdom
- Headquarters location: London, N1
- Distribution: Worldwide
- Publication types: Academic journals, magazines, online databases
- Nonfiction topics: Science, medicine
- Owner: Springer Nature
- No. of employees: >800
- Official website: nature.com

Nature Portfolio (formerly known as Nature Publishing Group and Nature Research) is a division of the international scientific publishing company Springer Nature that publishes academic journals, magazines, and online databases, in addition to offering services in science and medicine.

Nature Research's flagship publication is Nature, a weekly multidisciplinary journal first published in 1869. It also publishes the Nature-titled research journals, Nature Reviews journals (since 2000), society-owned academic journals, and a range of open access journals, including Scientific Reports and Nature Communications. Springer Nature also publishes Scientific American in 16 languages, a magazine intended for the general public.

In 2013, prior to the merger with Springer and the creation of Springer Nature, Nature Publishing Group's owner, Holtzbrinck Publishing Group, bought a controlling stake in Frontiers. Before Springer Nature was formed in 2015, Nature Research (as the Nature Publishing Group) was a part of Macmillan Science and Education, a fully owned subsidiary of Holtzbrinck Publishing Group.

== Company overview ==
Nature Research employs thousands of people in its offices in London, New York City, San Francisco, Seoul, Washington, D.C., Boston, Tokyo, Paris, Berlin, Munich, Madrid, Hong Kong, Shanghai, Delhi, Melbourne, Mexico City, Buenos Aires, São Paulo , Pune and Basingstoke. After the merger with Springer Science+Business Media in 2015, the company grew to about 13,000 employees.

In June 2025, the Trump administration moved to terminate certain federal government contracts with Springer Nature, citing political bias.

== Products ==
=== Journals ===
As of 2020, Nature Research publishes 156 academic journals. The former Nature Clinical Practice series was rebranded and folded into the Nature Reviews series in 2009. They also publish the npj (Nature Partner Journals) series.

==== Access and pricing ====
In most cases, the costs of Springer Nature's publications are recovered via subscription to individuals and institutions. Over 40 journals allow their authors to publish open access articles, with the author (or their institution or research funder) paying a publication charge to the journal. The publisher also has several open access journals. Authors are also allowed to post accepted, unedited papers on their websites or the funding body's archives no earlier than 6 months after publication.

In June 2010, a letter outlining the University of California libraries' pricing challenges with NPG was distributed to university faculty by campus librarians with the support of the systemwide University Committee on Library and Scholarly Communication. The letter also described a potential boycott if the dispute was not resolved. In August 2010, a joint statement was released stating "Our two organizations have agreed to work together in the coming months to address our mutual short- and long-term challenges, including an exploration of potential new approaches and evolving publishing models."

In December 2014, NPG announced that it would make content from all of Nature's journals available online for free. However, articles are presented using the digital rights management system ReadCube (which is funded by the Macmillan subsidiary Digital Science), which only provides "read-only" access, and does not allow readers to download, copy, print, or otherwise distribute the content. Additionally, links to these articles can only be generated by Nature subscribers and a group of selected media outlets, but the links can be publicly distributed through online articles and social networks afterwards. Providers can also provide annotations on the linked articles. The move was designed to counter the trend of "dark sharing", while leveraging ReadCube to provide analytics. While considering it a compromise between fully restricted access, critics do not consider this to be a true open access scheme due to its restrictions on use and distribution.

=== Textbooks ===
In 2011, Nature launched its first line of electronic textbooks for the college market, starting with Principles of Biology, which was adopted by California State University. The textbook line has been described by Vikram Savkar, senior vice president and publishing director at then Nature Publishing Group, as potentially breaking down the traditional textbook publishing model.

=== Other services ===
Other active Nature Portfolio services include:

- Nature Careers, containing careers news, advice, tools and jobs for scientists.
- A companion site to ENCODE, the Encyclopedia of DNA Elements, which is a project funded by the National Human Genome Research Institute to identify all regions of transcription, transcription factor association, chromatin structure and histone modification in the human genome sequence.
- Nature Index, an open database of author affiliations and institutional relationships. The Index tracks contributions to research articles published in high-quality natural-science and health-science journals, chosen based on reputation by an independent group of researchers. The database is compiled by Nature Research Intelligence, part of Springer Nature.

Past experiments at offering online services include:

- Scitable (a collaborative learning space for science students).
- The pre-print server Nature Precedings (which was discontinued in 2012).
- Connotea (a free online reference management service for scientists, which was created in 2004 and discontinued in 2013).
- Nature Network (a free social networking website for scientists, which was put into read-only mode in 2013).

== See also ==
- Frontiers (publisher)
- Elsevier
- Springer Nature
