= Communications Earth & Environment =

- Discipline: Environmental science Planetary science
- Language: English
- Edited by: Heike Langenberg

Publication details
- History: 2020–present
- Publisher: Nature Portfolio
- Frequency: Upon acceptance
- Open access: Yes
- License: CC-BY 4.0
- Impact factor: 8.1 (2023)

Standard abbreviations
- ISO 4: Commun. Earth Environ.

Indexing
- ISSN: 2662-4435
- OCLC no.: 1196407078

Links
- Journal homepage; Online archive

Communications Earth & Environment is a peer-reviewed, open-access, scientific journal in Earth science, environmental science and planetary science published by Nature Portfolio in 2020. The editor-in-chief is Heike Langenberg. Communications Earth & Environment was created as part of the Communications journals series at Nature Portfolio, following the introduction of Communications Biology, Communications Chemistry, and Communications Physics in 2018.

== Abstracting and indexing ==
The journal is abstracted and indexed in:

- Astrophysics Data System (ADS)
- Science Citation Index Expanded
- Scopus

According to the Journal Citation Reports, the journal has a 2023 impact factor of 8.1, ranking it 32nd out of 358 journals in the category "Environmental Sciences" and 11th out of 254 journals in the category "Geosciences, Multidisciplinary".

== See also ==
- Nature
- Nature Communications
- Scientific Reports
