= 1998 KY26 =

Near-Earth asteroid

1998 KY_{26}
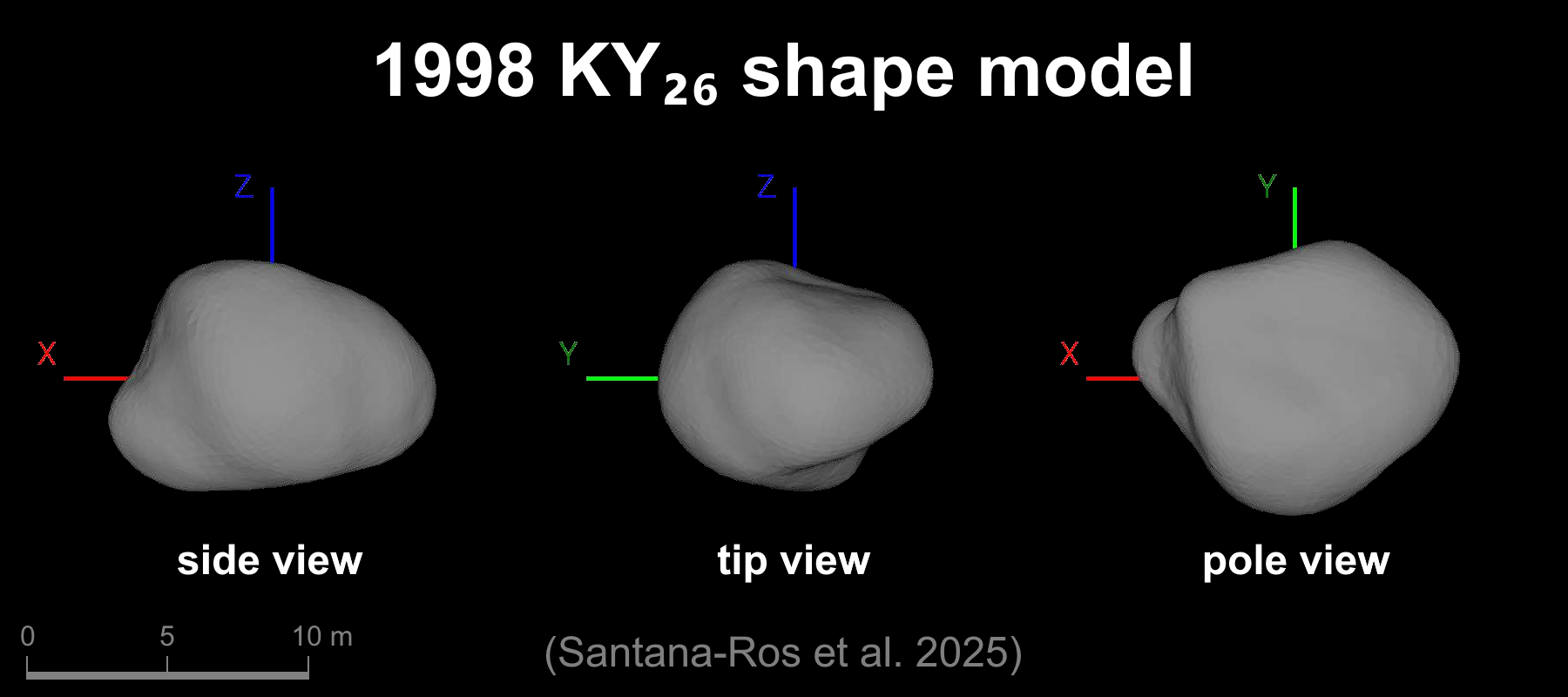
- Shape model of 1998 KY_{26} as seen from three different views. This model was constructed from observations of the asteroid's brightness from 1998 to 2024.

Discovery
- Discovered by: Spacewatch (Tom Gehrels)
- Discovery site: Kitt Peak Obs.
- Discovery date: 28 May 1998

Designations
- Minor planet category: NEO · Apollo

Orbital characteristics
- Epoch 9 June 2026 (JD 2461200.5)
- Uncertainty parameter 2
- Observation arc: 25.93 yr (9,472 days)
- Aphelion: 1.475 AU
- Perihelion: 0.983 AU
- Semi-major axis: 1.229 AU
- Eccentricity: 0.2000
- Orbital period (sidereal): 1.362 yr (497.6 days)
- Mean anomaly: 359.504°
- Mean motion: 0° 43^{m} 24.672^{s} / day
- Inclination: 1.491°
- Longitude of ascending node: 84.182°
- Argument of perihelion: 210.003°
- Earth MOID: 0.00256 AU (1.00 LD)

Physical characteristics
- Mean diameter: 11±2 m
- Mean density: 2.8+1.6 −1.0 g/cm^{3}
- Equatorial escape velocity: ~ 1 cm/s (~ 0.01 m/s)
- Synodic rotation period: 5.3516±0.0001 min
- Axial tilt: 136°±3° (to ecliptic)
- Pole ecliptic longitude: 36°+6° −5°
- Pole ecliptic latitude: −44°+12° −10°
- Geometric albedo: 0.52±0.08
- Spectral type: E or Xe
- Absolute magnitude (H): 26.13±0.16

1998 KY_{26} is a tiny near-Earth asteroid discovered by the University of Arizona's Spacewatch project on 28 May 1998. It measures 11 meters (36 feet) in diameter and rotates rapidly with a period of 5.35 minutes. It is believed to be most likely a solid chunk of rock, resembling one of the boulders seen on large rubble pile asteroids like Itokawa and Ryugu. Telescope observations have shown it to be an E-type asteroid, whose surface is bright white and rich in enstatite. It shares a similar composition and orbital inclination as 44 Nysa, which suggests that they formed together from a catastrophic collision event.

Due to 1998 KY_{26}'s small size, its rotation and orbit are gradually accelerated by sunlight-related forces, such as the Yarkovsky and YORP effects. Studies from 2025 have shown no evidence of cometary activity and anomalous acceleration in 1998 KY_{26}, which disproves the 2023 speculation that it might be a dark comet. It was originally intended to be visited by Japan's Hayabusa2 mission in 2031, but this plan was later abandoned due to problems with the spacecraft's engine.

== Observational history ==
=== Discovery ===
1998 KY_{26} was discovered by Tom Gehrels on the night of 28 May 1998, during routine observations for the University of Arizona's Spacewatch project. The Spacewatch project had the goal of discovering near-Earth asteroids and conducted its observations using a 0.9-meter (35 in) telescope at Kitt Peak, Arizona. In the discovery images, 1998 KY_{26} appeared as a small dot moving among background stars with an apparent magnitude of 18.9. During this time, 1998 KY_{26} was approaching Earth from an initial distance of 0.03 astronomical units (4.5 million km or 2.8 million mi).

Follow-up observations of 1998 KY_{26} began on 31 May 1998, starting with Spacewatch. Several other observatories around the world, including Kleť and Ondřejov Observatory in the Czech Republic, followed suit. With multiple days of observations, the Minor Planet Center (MPC) announced the discovery of 1998 KY_{26} on 1 June 1998, one week before the asteroid was set to make its closest approach to Earth.

=== First characterization ===
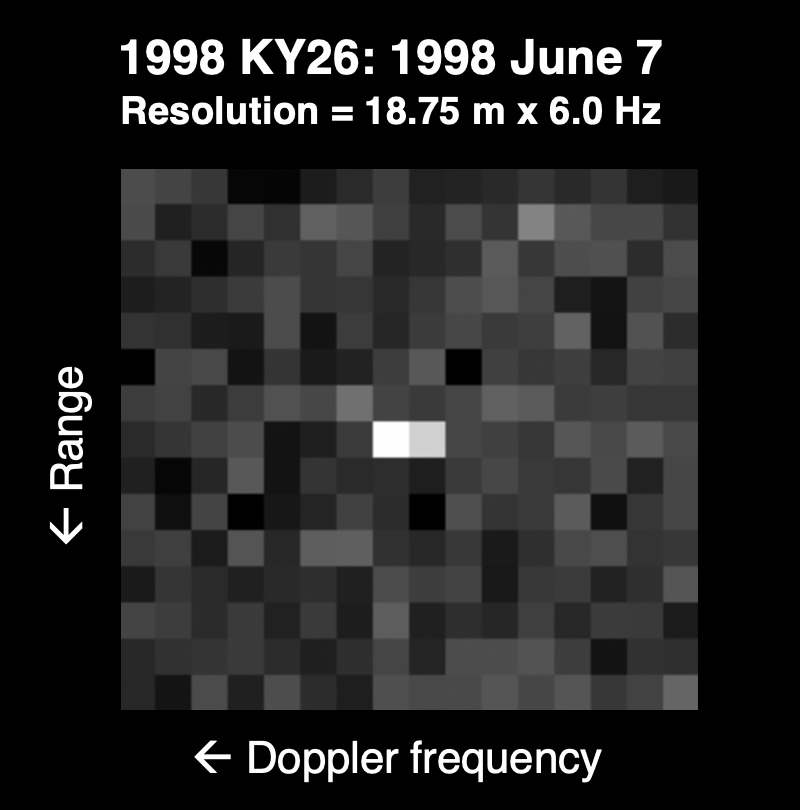
Delay-Doppler radar image of 1998 KY_{26}, taken by NASA's Goldstone Radar in 1998. While the asteroid's shape is unresolved, its rapid rotation spreads out the frequency of its reflected radar signal, horizontally smearing it.

By the time 1998 KY_{26}'s discovery was announced, the asteroid was still approaching Earth and brightening in the sky. The asteroid was predicted to brighten up to apparent magnitude 16 and pass within 2.1 lunar distances (810,000 km; 500,000 mi) of Earth, providing astronomers the opportunity to study it in detail. From 2 to 8 June, astronomers monitored the brightness of 1998 KY_{26}, revealing that it rotates rapidly with a period of several minutes. On 3 June, astronomers made the first measurement of 1998 KY_{26}'s color. During 1998 KY_{26}'s closest approach between 6 and 8 June, a team of astronomers led by Steven J. Ostro observed the asteroid with the Goldstone Solar System Radar in California, confirming earlier measurements of its rapid rotation and providing the first direct measurement of its size and shape. In July 1999, Ostro's team published their results in the journal Science and in a Jet Propulsion Laboratory press release, proclaiming 1998 KY_{26} as the smallest and fastest-rotating asteroid studied in detail at the time.

=== Hayabusa2 preparation ===
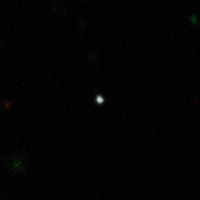
Color photograph of 1998 KY_{26} (center) by the Gemini South telescope on 31 May 2024

Before its cancellation announcement in 2026, the Japan Aerospace Exploration Agency (JAXA) announced its plan to visit 1998 KY_{26} in 2031 with its operational Hayabusa2 space probe. However, at the time the announcement was made, 1998 KY_{26} still had a large orbital uncertainty. The asteroid had not been observed since 2002 because it was too dim and far away from Earth. Astronomers had to wait for 1998 KY_{26}'s close approach to Earth every three and a half years before they could observe it. By monitoring 1998 KY_{26}'s position over several years, its orbital uncertainty can be reduced.

In December 2020, 1998 KY_{26} was predicted to pass within 0.47 AU (70 million km; 44 million mi) of Earth. During that time, the asteroid was predicted to brighten up to apparent magnitude 25, making it very dim and detectable to only the largest optical telescopes. Between 10 and 12 December, European and Japanese teams of astronomers observed 1998 KY_{26} with the Very Large Telescope and Subaru Telescope, respectively. The MPC reported the recovery of 1998 KY_{26} on 15 December 2020.

In June 2024, 1998 KY_{26} made a closer approach to Earth at a distance of 12 LD (4.6 million km; 2.9 million mi). The asteroid was predicted to brighten up to apparent magnitude 20, once again providing astronomers the chance to further refine its orbit and study its properties. During May to June and October to November, a team of astronomers led by Toni Santana-Ros observed 1998 KY_{26} using various large optical telescopes around the world. They found that the asteroid was three times smaller and rotating twice as fast as previously thought. They additionally reanalyzed radar data from 1998 and found that it matches their new results. The team published their findings in September 2025, through the journal Nature Communications and in press releases by their affiliated institutions.

1998 KY_{26} will make its next close approach to Earth in 2028, at a minimum distance of 0.35 AU (52 million km; 33 million mi). Although the asteroid will be farther away, it may be observable with the James Webb Space Telescope (JWST) in March 2028 or October 2028. The JWST may be able provide a more definitive measurement of 1998 KY_{26}'s size and thermal properties.

== Name ==
This asteroid is currently known by its minor planet provisional designation 1998 KY_{26}, given by the MPC upon its discovery. The provisional designation encodes the year, half-month, and order of the asteroid's discovery. It has not been given a formal name and a minor planet number, because it has not been observed over enough oppositions. Once the MPC gives 1998 KY_{26} a number, the asteroid's discoverer can propose a name for it. According to naming guidelines by the International Astronomical Union's Working Group for Small Bodies Nomenclature, near-Earth asteroids with perihelion distances smaller than 1.15 AU should be given mythological names not related to creation or the underworld.

== Orbit and classification ==
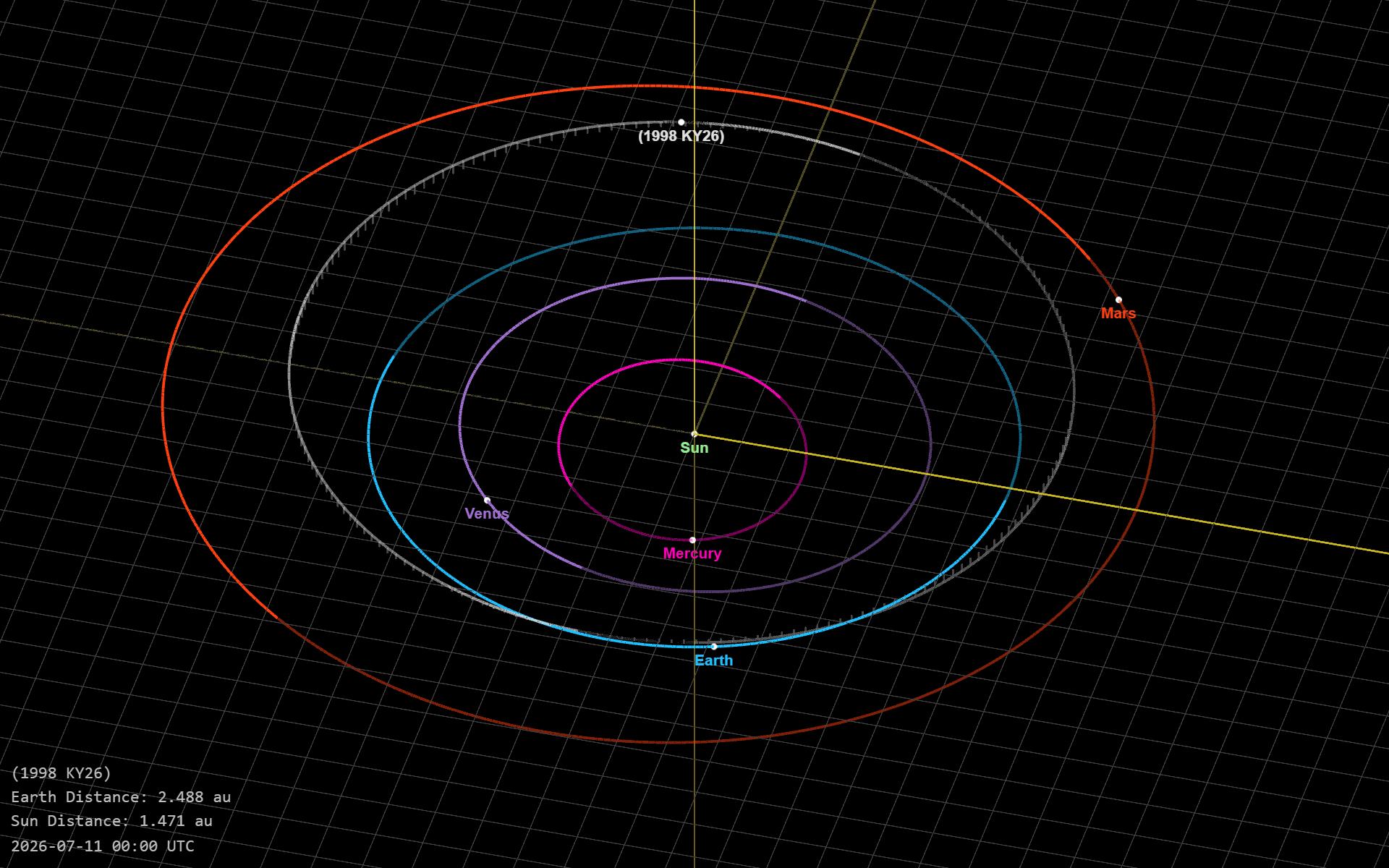
Diagram showing the orbits of 1998 KY_{26} and the four inner planets

1998 KY_{26} orbits the Sun at an average distance (semi-major axis) of 1.23 astronomical units (AU), completing one orbit every 1.36 years. It follows a slightly elliptical and tilted orbit, with an orbital eccentricity of 0.20 and an inclination of 1.5° with respect to the ecliptic. Throughout its elliptical orbit, 1998 KY_{26}'s distance from the Sun ranges from 0.98 AU at perihelion to 1.47 AU at aphelion. It crosses the orbit of Earth with a minimum orbit intersection distance of 0.00256 AU (383,000 km; 238,000 mi), allowing for close approaches to the planet.

Since 1998 KY_{26} comes close to Earth, it is classified as a near-Earth asteroid. It is specifically classified as an Apollo asteroid, because it has a wide, Earth-crossing orbit with a semi-major axis above 1 AU and a perihelion below 1.017 AU. It makes close approaches to Earth every three and a half years, although the distances vary from 0.005 to 0.5 AU (0.75 to 74.80 million km; 0.46 to 46.48 million mi). 1998 KY_{26} poses no threat to Earth; if it were on a collision course with the planet, the asteroid would most likely explode in the upper atmosphere and harmlessly drop its fragments to the ground.

The shape and low inclination of 1998 KY_{26}'s orbit makes it an accessible target for intercepting with a space probe. For a spacecraft to leave low-Earth orbit and enter a rendezvous trajectory toward 1998 KY_{26}, it would require a total velocity change (Δv) of 4.2 km/s, lower than that needed for a rendezvous with the Moon (6 km/s). A Hohmann transfer of a spacecraft onto a rendezvous with 1998 KY_{26} requires a minimum Δv of 3.34 km/s. For a direct Earth-to-1998 KY_{26} transfer involving two burn impulses, the required Δv is even smaller at 0.82 km/s.

=== Non-gravitational acceleration ===
Due to 1998 KY_{26}'s small size and proximity to the Sun, it exhibits noticeable non-gravitational acceleration from sunlight-related forces, such as the Yarkovsky effect. The Yarkovsky effect involves the asteroid absorbing sunlight and asymmetrically re-emitting it as thermal radiation, which causes the asteroid to recoil and deviate from its orbital path. Since 1998 KY_{26} is rotating backwards (retrograde) relative to its orbital direction, the Yarkovsky effect gradually shrinks its orbital semi-major axis. As of 2025, the Yarkovsky effect is believed to be largely responsible for 1998 KY_{26}'s observed non-gravitational acceleration. Based on data as of 2024, the Jet Propulsion Laboratory calculates 1998 KY_{26}'s non-gravitational acceleration to be (3.66±3.87)×10^{−11} AU/day^{2}, (−2.20±0.49)×10^{−14} AU/day^{2}, and (−1.69±1.12)×10^{−12} AU/day^{2} in the radial (A1), transverse (A2), and normal (A3) directions, respectively. Although 1998 KY_{26} experiences a stronger solar radiation pressure than the Yarkovsky effect, the radiation pressure is less efficient at perturbing the asteroid, because it mainly acts in the radial direction.

The Yarkovsky effect was first predicted for 1998 KY_{26} in 2000, but it was not detected until 2023. In a 2023 study, a team led by Darryl Seligman noticed that 1998 KY_{26} displayed a large normal acceleration, which seemingly could not be explained by the Yarkovsky effect. In that study, Seligman's team proposed that 1998 KY_{26} might be a dark comet, whose normal acceleration might be caused by unseen outgassing. The dark comet hypothesis for 1998 KY_{26} was disproven in 2025; observations from 2024 showed no evidence of ejected dust from outgassing, and a 2025 reanalysis led by Davide Farnocchia showed that the asteroid's non-gravitational acceleration can be fully explained by the Yarkovsky effect when using the asteroid's updated properties from 2024.

== Physical properties ==
=== Shape, rotation, and structure ===
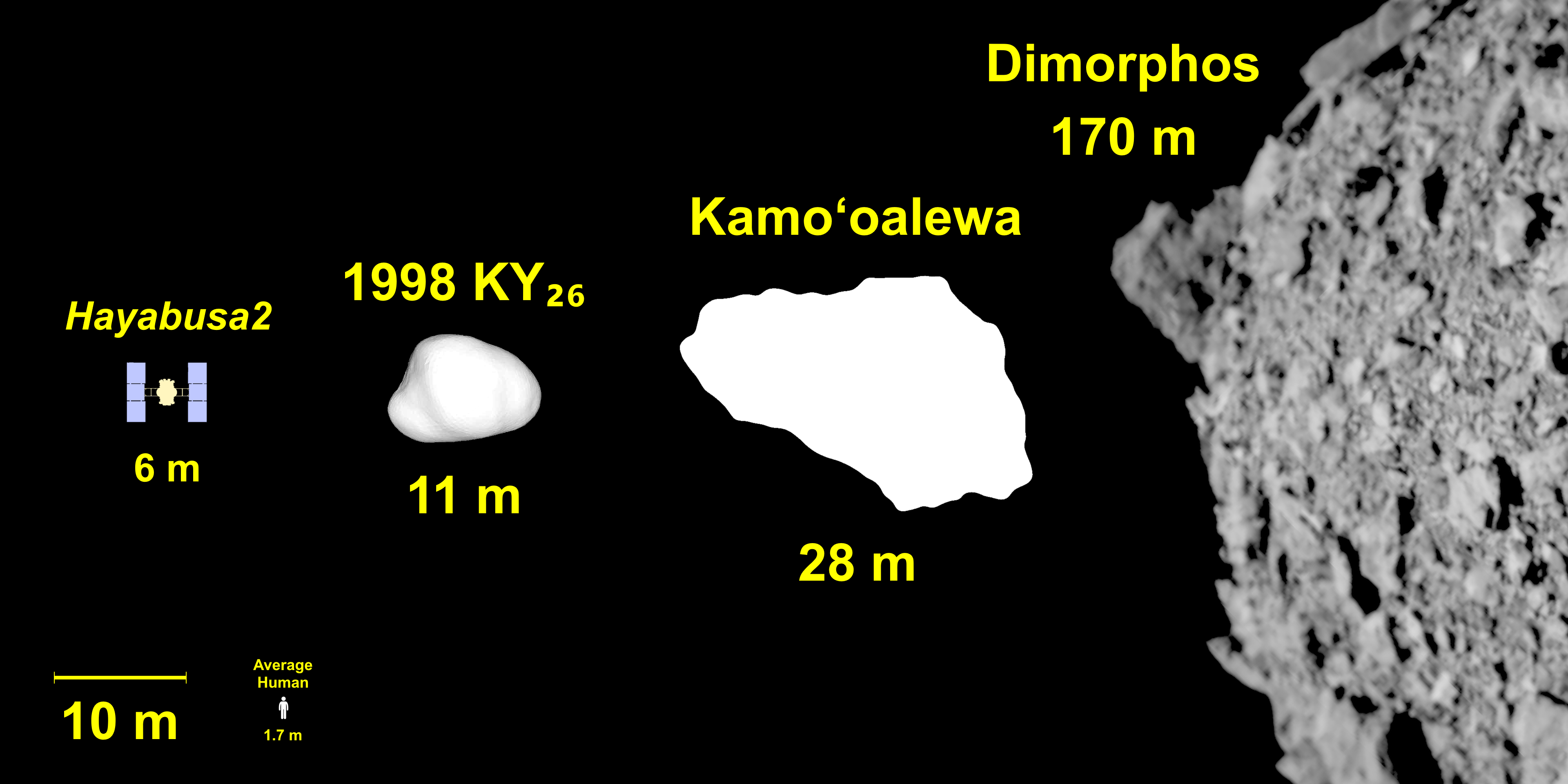
Size comparison of small asteroids 1998 KY_{26}, Kamoʻoalewa, and Dimorphos. On the left, the average human and the Hayabusa2 spacecraft are shown for scale.

1998 KY_{26} is a tiny asteroid with a diameter of 11 ± 2 meters (36 ± 7 ft), roughly twice the width of the Hayabusa2 spacecraft (6 m or 20 ft). The asteroid's diameter was determined from radar and optical telescope measurements of its brightness and albedo. Due to its small size, the asteroid's gravity is expected to be extremely weak, with an estimated escape velocity of about 1 cm/s. Measurements of 1998 KY_{26}'s Yarkovsky acceleration indicate that the asteroid has an area-to-mass ratio of (5.54±0.97)×10^{−5} m^{2}/kg and a bulk density of 2.8+1.6
−1.0 g/cm^{3}.

1998 KY_{26} rotates rapidly with a period of 5.35 minutes, with a measurement uncertainty of 6 milliseconds. As it rotates, its brightness fluctuates due to its elongated shape. Observations of 1998 KY_{26}'s brightness variations from 1998 to 2024 show that the asteroid has an asymmetric and moderately elongated shape, with slight flattening along its rotation axes. Modeling of the asteroid's shape suggests that it has a large concavity close to its southern hemisphere.

The asteroid's rotational north pole points toward the ecliptic coordinates (λ, β) = (36°, −44°), giving it an axial tilt of 136° with respect to the ecliptic. (Note: The ecliptic latitude β is the angle offset from the ecliptic plane (β = 0°), while the axial tilt (obliquity i) with respect to the ecliptic is the angle offset from the ecliptic north pole (β = +90°). 1998 KY_{26}'s ecliptic obliquity of i = 136° is calculated by subtracting its rotation pole's ecliptic latitude of β = −44° from the ecliptic north pole's latitude of β = +90°: i = +90°−(−44°) = 136°.) This makes the asteroid's rotation retrograde, meaning it rotates backwards relative to its orbital direction. Calculations predict that the asteroid's rotation is gradually speeding up due to the YORP effect. The YORP effect is estimated to cause an annual fractional change of 7×10^{−6} to 1998 KY_{26}'s rotation period, meaning the rotation period decreases by roughly 2 milliseconds per year. (Note: Multiplying the annual fractional change of 7×10^{−6} yr^{−1} with 1998 KY_{26}'s rotation period of 5.3516 min gives a rotation period reduction rate of 3.746×10^{−5} min/yr, or 2.248×10^{−5} ms/yr.) The YORP effect has not yet been detected in 1998 KY_{26}, and it is not expected to produce a noticeable change to its rotation period by 2030.

Due to 1998 KY_{26}'s small size and rapid rotation, centrifugal forces exceed the surface gravity at its equator. For this reason, the asteroid's surface is expected to lack loose boulders, as they would be flung away. For material to stick onto 1998 KY_{26}'s surface, it must have a minimum cohesive strength between 4 and 20 pascals. While this makes it possible for 1998 KY_{26} to have a rubble pile structure, models suggest that tiny, decameter-sized rubble piles are unlikely to form. 1998 KY_{26} is instead more likely to be a solid chunk of rock, resembling one of the boulders seen on the surfaces of larger rubble pile asteroids like Itokawa and Ryugu. Any loose material on 1998 KY_{26}'s surface would most likely exist as fine grains covering the asteroid's poles, where centrifugal acceleration is minimal.

=== Surface composition ===
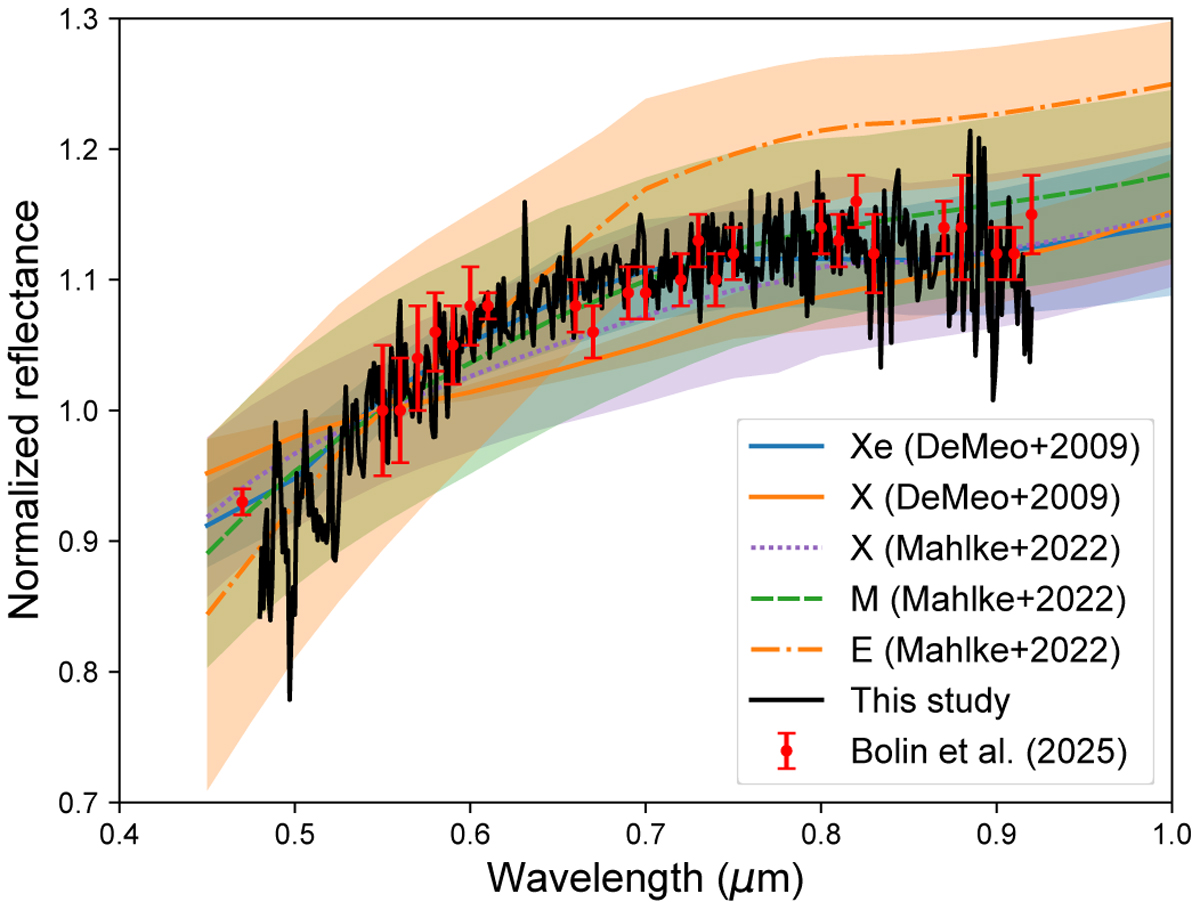
The visible spectrum of 1998 KY_{26} (black and red) is similar to the asteroid spectral types X, M, and E, as overlayed in this plot.

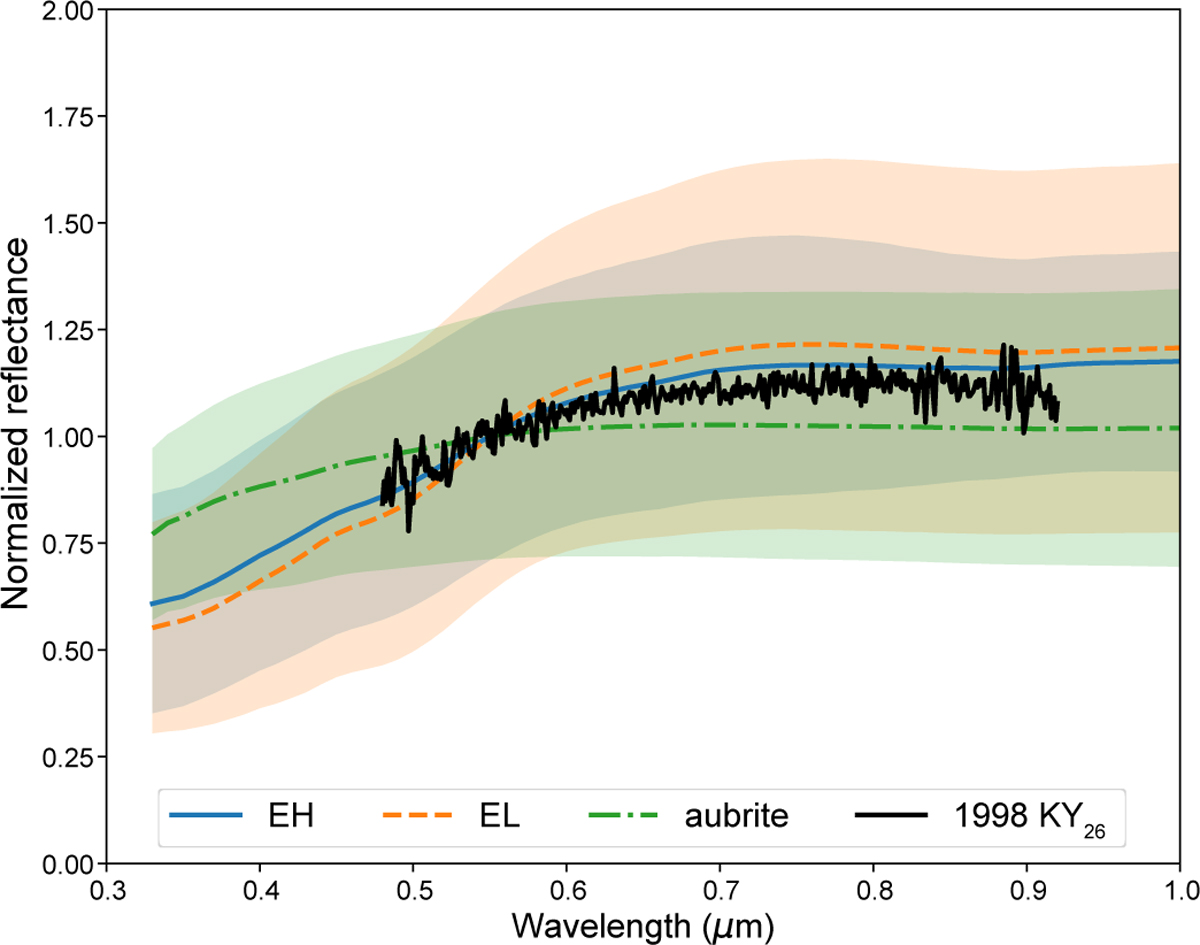
The visible spectrum of 1998 KY_{26} (black) most closely resembles those of EL- and EH-type enstatite chondrite meteorites (blue and orange).

Spectroscopic observations from 2024 have shown that 1998 KY_{26} is an E-type asteroid, meaning it is a highly reflective asteroid mainly made of enstatite. In visible light, 1998 KY_{26} appears white. Its visible spectrum most closely resembles those of EL- and EH-type enstatite chondrite meteorites, although its high geometric albedo of 0.52 aligns more closely with aubrite (enstatite achondrite) meteorites.

In the Bus–DeMeo and Tholen classification systems for asteroid spectral types, 1998 KY_{26} is classified as an X-type asteroid. This is because the visible spectra of E-type asteroids are often indistinguishable from those of metallic M-type and organic-rich P-type asteroids, so they are collectively categorized as X-type. 1998 KY_{26} exhibits a subtle absorption band at the visible wavelength of 0.49 μm, which might indicate the presence of troilite or other opaque minerals. This absorption band distinguishes the asteroid as an Xe-type in the Bus–DeMeo system. In the Solar System, E-type and Xe-type asteroids are relatively rare.

Early studies from 1998 previously suggested that 1998 KY_{26} might be carbonaceous and water-rich, but this was disproven by observations from 2024.

== Origin ==
A 2026 study led by Eri Tatsumi found that 1998 KY_{26}'s surface composition resembles those of the X-type asteroids 44 Nysa and 135 Hertha. Although these two asteroids differ in composition, they share similar low-inclination orbits alongside many other asteroids in a region of the inner main asteroid belt, known as the Nysa–Polana complex. The compositions of Nysa and Hertha suggest that they originated from different layers of a now-destroyed parent body. Based on this idea, Tatsumi and colleagues proposed that 1998 KY_{26} and Nysa originated as fragments of this parent body's enstatite-rich crust, while Hertha originated from deeper layers.

Theoretical models indicate that within a few million years after the parent body's destruction, the semi-major axes of small fragments like 1998 KY_{26} significantly drift inward due to the Yarkovsky effect. These drifting asteroids eventually become captured in the ν_{6} secular resonance 2 AU away from the Sun, in which their apsidal precession rate matches that of Saturn. The ν_{6} secular resonance raises the eccentricity of these drifting asteroids, which ultimately directs them into Earth-crossing orbits. The low inclination of 1998 KY_{26}'s present-day orbit is consistent with those of asteroids in the Nysa–Polana complex, which supports the hypothesis that they share a common origin. Previous studies had suggested a possible origin from the highly-inclined Hungaria family, but Tatsumi and colleagues argued that it is implausible for 1998 KY_{26} to have undergone drastic changes to its inclination.

In 2026, Avi Loeb and colleagues proposed that 1998 KY_{26} might be the lost Soviet spacecraft Phobos 1. Their analysis, which as of June 2026 was not peer reviewed, argued that the spacecraft's available propulsion could account for the difference between the two trajectories and noted similarities in size, reflectivity and inferred shape. The proposed identification remains unconfirmed.

== Proposed exploration ==
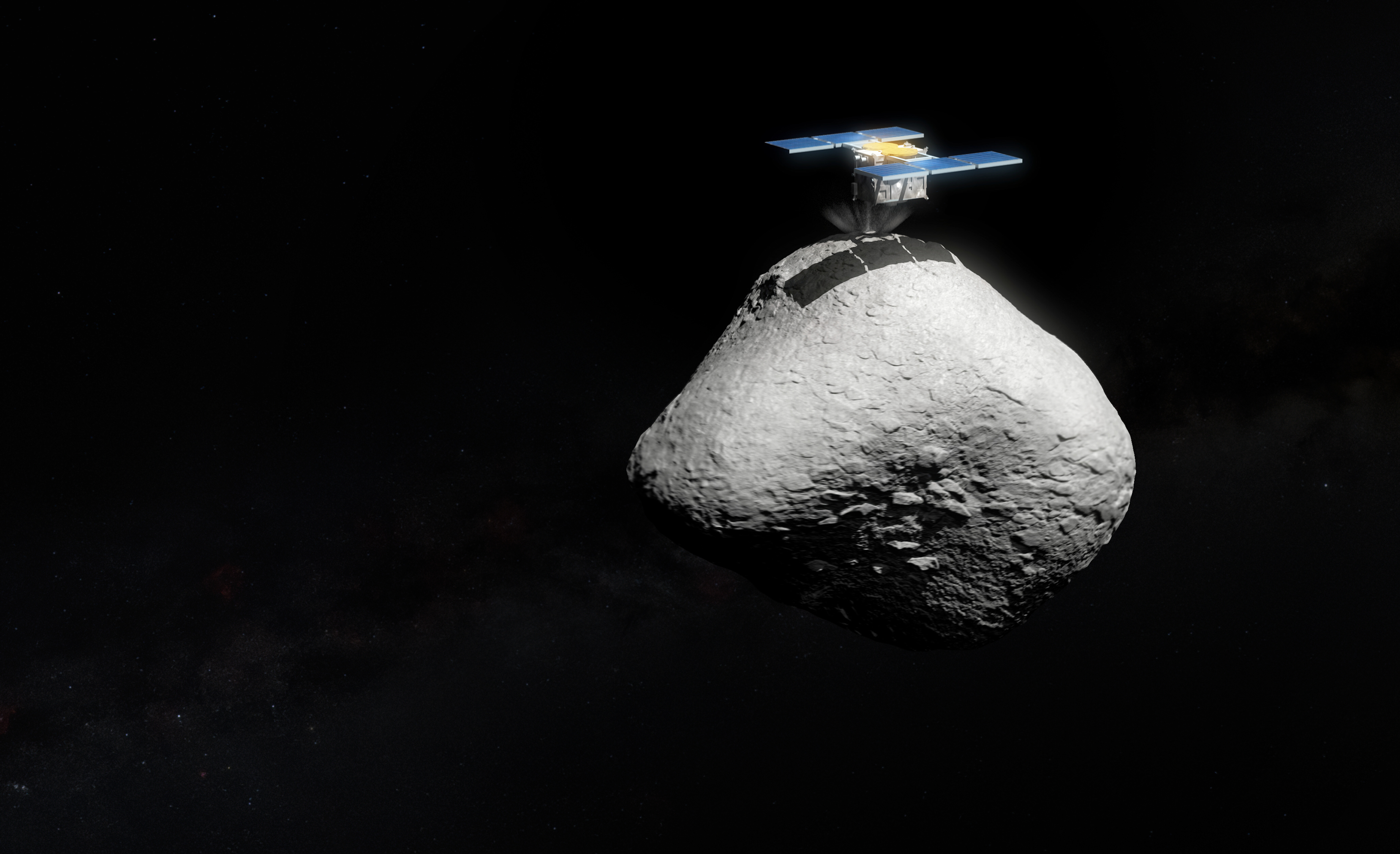
Artist's impression of Hayabusa2 landing on 1998 KY_{26}

Animation of Hayabusa2's orbit from 2014 to 2031
Hayabusa2 · Ryugu · Earth · Torifune · 1998 KY_{26}

In 2020, JAXA announced a mission extension for its Hayabusa2 spacecraft, which successfully retrieved samples of asteroid Ryugu in 2019. This extended mission, titled the Small Hazardous Asteroid Reconnaissance Probe (SHARP or ♯), tasked the spacecraft to visit two more near-Earth asteroids: 98943 Torifune in July 2026 and a rendezvous with 1998 KY_{26} in July 2031. These asteroids were chosen because they required a low amount of fuel (Δv < 1.6 km/s) to reach within 10 years. JAXA presented the initial plan in July 2020 with the choice of visiting either 1998 KY_{26} or 2001 AV43, and ultimately selected 1998 KY_{26} in September 2020.

However, in November 2026, JAXA announced that they had abandoned their plan to visit 1998 KY_{26} due to engine problems preventing Hayabusa2 from being able to make critical trajectory changes. Hayabusa2 will instead be redirected to perform a flyby of the rapidly-rotating 17–74 m (56–243 ft)-sized near-Earth asteroid 2015 BM510 in 2028.

== See also ==
- List of minor planets and comets visited by spacecraft
- Chelyabinsk meteor – a similarly-sized near-Earth asteroid that entered Earth's atmosphere and exploded over Chelyabinsk, Russia in 2013
- 98943 Torifune – a near-Earth asteroid visited by Hayabusa2 in 2026
- 2001 AV43 – a small near-Earth asteroid that was previously considered as an alternative target for Hayabusa2's extended mission
- 469219 Kamoʻoalewa – a similarly-sized near-Earth asteroid visited by China's Tianwen-2 mission in 2026
- (33342) 1998 WT24 – an E-type near-Earth asteroid with an orbit accessible to spacecraft, like 1998 KY_{26}
- 2015 TC25 – a tiny, rapidly-rotating E-type near-Earth asteroid
