= Dark comet =

Class of asteroids

Dark comets are a class of asteroids that exhibit some behavior consistent with comets, but do not grow a comet's tail or produce a coma, making them visually appear as asteroids. They are distinguished from other asteroids by their non-gravitational acceleration, which causes them to deviate from their expected orbital path. Dark comets were first identified as a distinct class of objects in 2023. They mostly fall into two families, the outer dark comets, and the inner dark comets, which are distinguished by their size and orbital characteristics.

== Discovery ==
The first object that exhibited “dark comet” behavior was ‘Oumuamua, an interstellar object discovered in 2017, which was found to exhibit “non-gravitational acceleration,” that is too strong to be explained by the Yarkovsky effect or solar radiation pressure. What made this notable was that, while this is typical of comets, observations by the Spitzer Space Telescope did not find any cometary activity. As astrophysicist Darryl Seligman put it, "It moved like a comet, but didn't have the classic coma, or tail, of a comet."

Since the unexplained acceleration is away from the direction of the sun, the scientists hypothesized that the acceleration is produced by outgassing from the sunlit side of the surface.

A team of astronomers began searching the asteroid belt for more objects that behaved the same way. By 2024, astronomers had identified 14 asteroids that moved like comets. These were divided into two families. The outer family was made up of larger asteroids, measuring hundreds of meters or more, and seemed to reflect more light. They had larger orbits, resembling those of Jupiter-family comets, which pass near Jupiter's orbit at aphelion. The inner family asteroids were smaller, all 50 meters or less in diameter, and had more circular orbits.

== Exploration ==
1998 KY26, the target of Japan's Hayabusa2 mission in July 2031, was later identified by astronomers as a dark comet. However, new measurements taken during its 2024 close approach to Earth have thrown this conclusion into question. The asteroid was found to be smaller and rotating faster, and showed no evidence of ejected dust from outgassing. A reanalysis using a model derived from its updated physical properties showed that the asteroid's non-gravitational acceleration can be fully explained by the Yarkovsky effect. Further work will determine if the new model can also explain the anomalous accelerations for other small dark comets of the inner family.
