= 98943 Torifune =

Apollo asteroid target of Hayabusa2's extended mission

- Torifune as imaged by Hayabusa2 on 5 July 2026

Discovery
- Discovered by: LINEAR
- Discovery site: Lincoln Lab ETS
- Discovery date: 3 February 2001

Designations
- Named after: Ame-no-torifune
- Alternative designations: 2001 CC_{21} 1982 VE_{13}
- Minor planet category: NEO · Apollo

Orbital characteristics
- Epoch 25 February 2023 (JD 2460000.5)
- Uncertainty parameter 0
- Observation arc: 40.31 yr (14,725 days)
- Earliest precovery date: 10 November 1982
- Aphelion: 1.259 AU
- Perihelion: 0.806 AU
- Semi-major axis: 1.032 AU
- Eccentricity: 0.2192
- Orbital period (sidereal): 1.05 yr (383.1 d)
- Mean anomaly: 280.856°
- Mean motion: 0° 56^{m} 23.328^{s} / day
- Inclination: 4.807°
- Longitude of ascending node: 75.519°
- Argument of perihelion: 179.441°
- Earth MOID: 0.08303 AU (12,421,000 km)

Physical characteristics
- Dimensions: 840 × 340 m
- Mean diameter: 540 m
- Synodic rotation period: 5.021516±0.000106 h
- Axial tilt: 5°±3° (wrt ecliptic)
- Pole ecliptic longitude: 301°±35°
- Pole ecliptic latitude: +89°+1° −6°
- Geometric albedo: 0.208 (NEOWISE+Spitzer); 0.23±0.04 (polarimetry)
- Spectral type: S or Sq
- Absolute magnitude (H): 18.78±0.14; 18.71

98943 Torifune (provisional designation 2001 CC_{21}) is an Apollo-type near-Earth asteroid with a diameter of about 450 metres (1,500 feet). It was discovered by the Lincoln Near-Earth Asteroid Research (LINEAR) survey at Socorro, New Mexico, United States on 3 February 2001. It was a flyby target of JAXA's Hayabusa2 spacecraft as a part of its extended mission, which approached as close as 744 m (0.462 mi) from the center of the asteroid on 5 July 2026.

Observations by Hayabusa2 have shown that Torifune is a contact binary asteroid. Telescope observations from Earth had previously indicated that Torifune is an elongated S-type asteroid with a rocky, weathered surface composed mostly of the silicate minerals pyroxene and olivine. It rotates with a period of 5.02 hours and has a small axial tilt of around 5° with respect to Earth's orbit.

== Discovery and naming ==
This asteroid was discovered on 3 February 2001 by the Lincoln Near-Earth Asteroid Research project near Socorro, New Mexico, United States. After several days of further observations by other observatories, the Minor Planet Center (MPC) published the asteroid's discovery on 9 February 2001 and gave it the provisional designation 2001 CC_{21}. The MPC gave the permanent minor planet number of 98943 for the asteroid on 24 February 2005.

After selecting the asteroid as a target for Hayabusa2's extended mission, JAXA held a public naming campaign for the asteroid from December 2023 to May 2024. A committee of Hayabusa2 team members and their children reviewed the 60 names submitted to the campaign and ultimately chose "Torifune". The LINEAR team on behalf of the Hayabusa2 team proposed the name to the International Astronomical Union's Working Group for Small Body Nomenclature, which approved and announced the name on 23 September 2024. "Torifune" is an abbreviation of Ame-no-torifune, the name of a Japanese god and his ship, "which can travel safely at high speed like a bird and steady as a rock."

== Orbit and observation ==
Torifune is a near-Earth asteroid following an elliptical orbit around the Sun, with a semi-major axis of 1.03 astronomical units (AU), an orbital period of 1.05 years, an orbital eccentricity 0.22, and an inclination of 4.8°. Torifune is classified as an Apollo asteroid because it crosses the orbit of Earth with a semi-major axis outside Earth's orbit (>1 AU). At perihelion of 0.81 AU from the Sun, Torifune can come close to Venus. Due to the Yarkovsky effect, the orbit of Torifune is gradually drifting with a transverse acceleration (A_{2}) of (1.3±0.6)×10^{−14} AU/day^{2}.

The asteroid's orbital period around the Sun is similar to that of Earth's, which allows it to hover near Earth for longer periods of time (giving it a long synodic period). Based on its minimum orbit intersection distances, Torifune can come as close as 0.083 AU (12.4 million km; 7.7 million mi) to Earth and as close as 0.080 AU (12.0 million km; 7.4 million mi) from Venus. During its long-lasting close approaches to Earth, Torifune becomes brighter than apparent magnitude 18, which makes it to observable to small- and medium-class telescopes on Earth. When viewed in a frame rotating with Earth's orbit, Torifune appears to move in an epicyclic path with a slowly drifting center.

Torifune has been observed for over 13 oppositions, with an observation arc spanning more than 40 years as of 2026. Torifune has been identified in two precovery observations, which were both taken by the Siding Spring Observatory on 10 November 1982. The extensive number of observations provide a highly accurate determination of Torifune's orbit, which allows for the prediction of stellar occultations, where Torifune passes in front of a background star. As of 2026, only one occultation by Torifune has been observed; it was observed on 5 March 2024 by only one person in Japan, with 19 others reporting no detection.

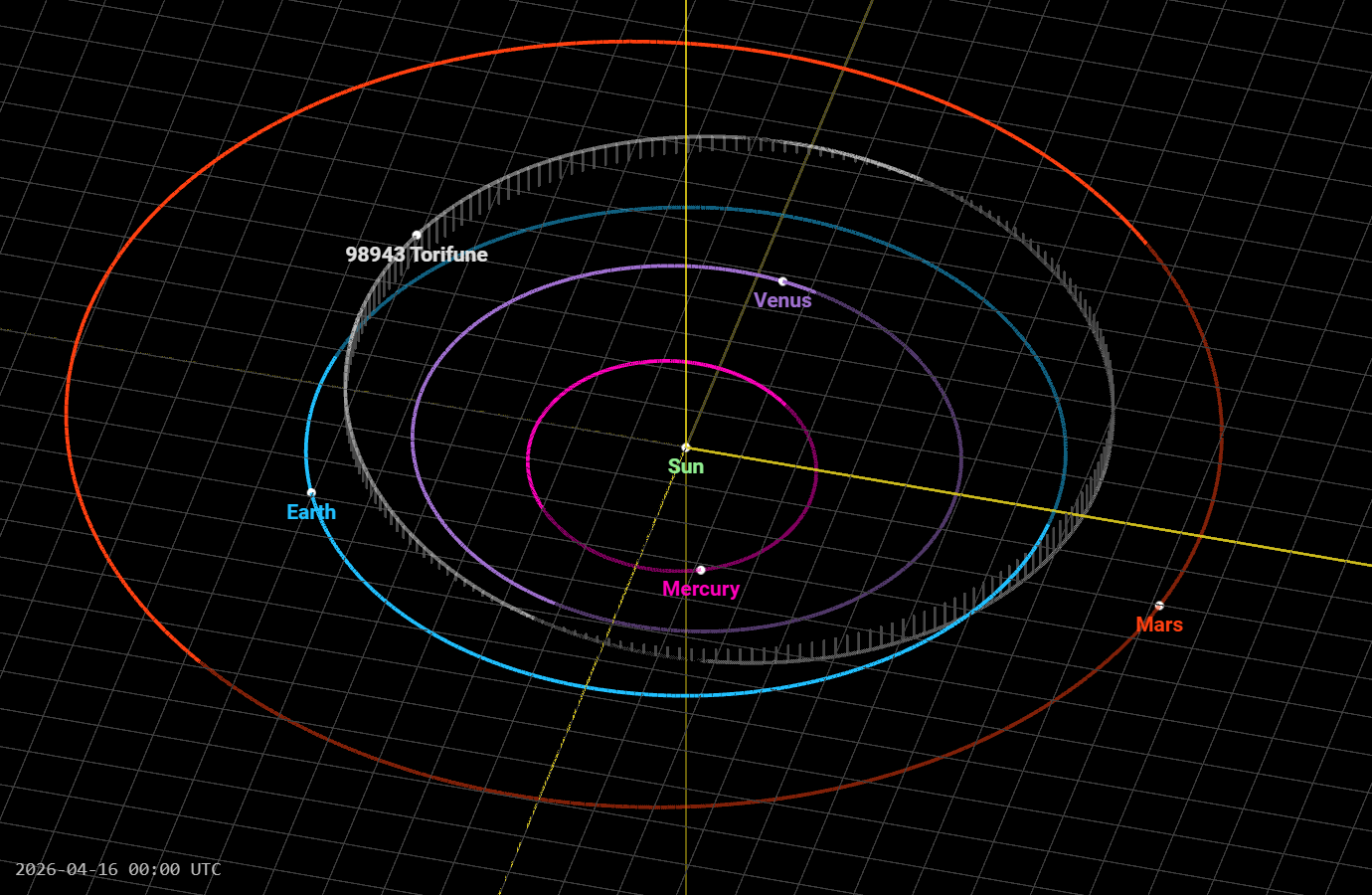
Diagram showing the orbits of Torifune (white) and the four inner planets

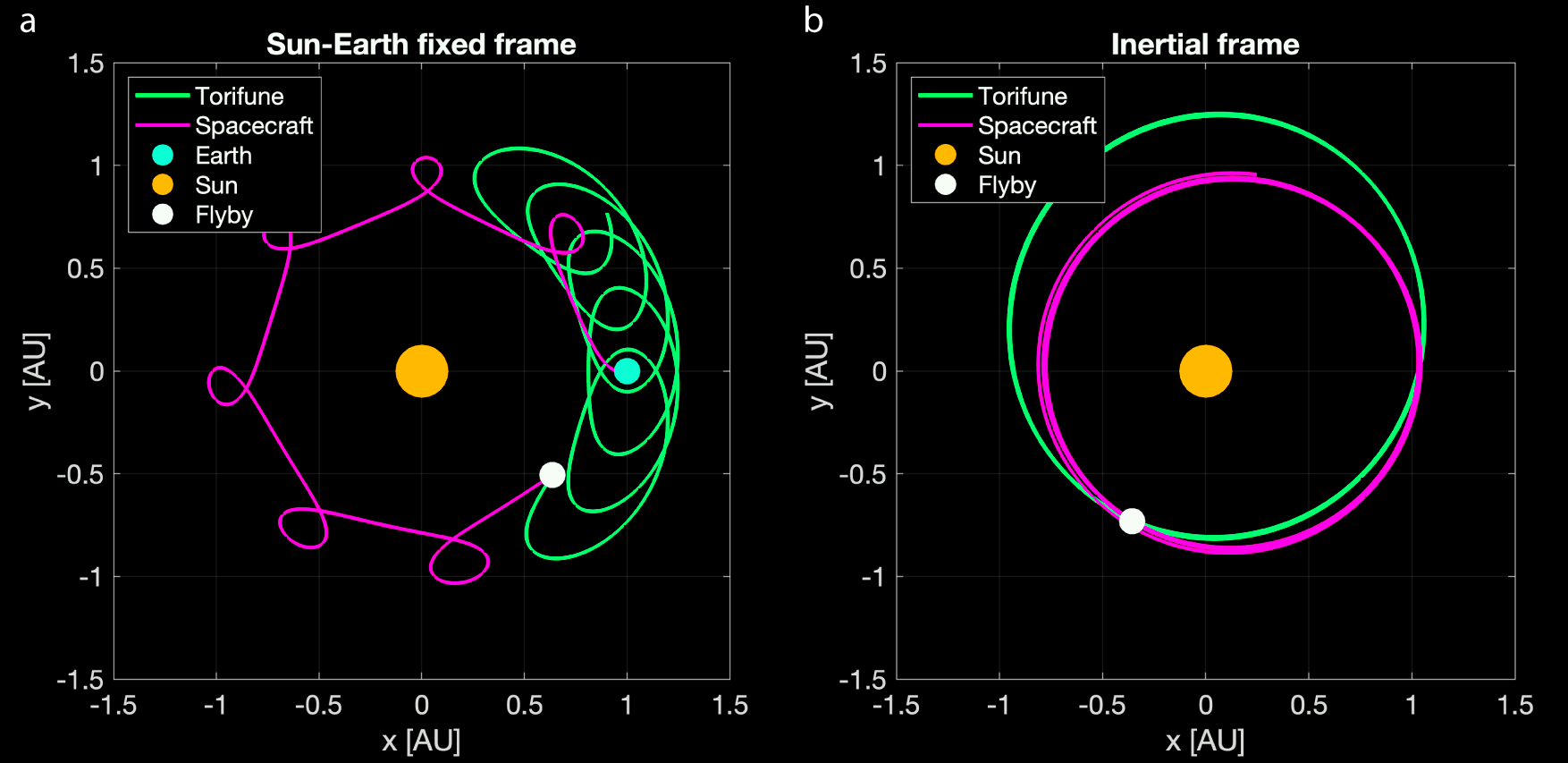
Top views of Torifune's orbit and Hayabusa2's trajectory from December 2020 to July 2026, as viewed in a frame rotating with Earth's orbit (a; left) and in a stationary frame (b; right)

== Exploration ==
Animation of Hayabusa2's trajectory from 2014 to 2031, with Torifune's orbit shown in cyan. Hayabusa2 · Ryugu · Earth · Torifune · 1998 KY26

In September 2020, a mission extension for JAXA's Hayabusa2 asteroid sample return probe was selected to do additional flybys of two near-Earth asteroids: Torifune in July 2026 and a rendezvous with 1998 KY26 in July 2031, although the latter flyby was rerouted to 2015 BM510 in 2028 due to problems with the spacecraft's engine. Hayabusa2 flew by Torifune at an estimated distance of 744 m (0.462 mi) and a very high relative speed of 5 km/s (3.1 mi/s), posing a challenge for the spacecraft's navigation and tracking capabilities during the encounter.

== Physical characteristics ==
=== Size, shape, and rotation ===
Telescopic observations have shown that Torifune is smaller than 1 km (1,000 m; 3,300 ft) in diameter, with various studies finding diameter measurements between 300 and 500 m (980 and 1,640 ft) (most likely around 450 m or 1,480 ft). There is a large uncertainty in Torifune's diameter because it is calculated from an uncertain absolute magnitude of 18.78±0.14. As of August 2026, the latest published measurement of Torifune's diameter is 540 m (1,770 ft). This diameter was derived by measurements from Hayabusa2.

Torifune shows periodic variations in brightness as it rotates, which indicates it has an elongated shape. First determined in 2002, photometric measurements of Torifune's light curve show that it has a rotation period of about 5.02 hours. Observations of long-term changes in Torifune's lightcurve suggest that it has a prograde rotation with a low axial tilt of 5°±3° with respect to the ecliptic. In visible light, the brightness of Torifune varies by up to 0.96 magnitudes during one rotation period, which suggests its longest equatorial diameter is roughly 2.44 times as long as its shortest equatorial diameter (equatorial axes ratio b/a=0.41). An approximate shape model derived from Torifune's lightcurve suggests it has dimensions of 840+160
−120 × 320+100
−80 × 340+60
−60 m. The inferred elongation of Torifune's shape allows for the possibility that it might be a contact binary object. On the other hand, near-infrared observations by NEOWISE show smaller variations in brightness, suggesting a less elongated shape with dimensions of 591 m × 461 m × 392 m (1,939 ft × 1,512 ft × 1,286 ft) or an equatorial axes ratio of b/a=0.804±0.060. Observations by Hayabusa2 resulted in measurements for its longest and shortest axis being 840 m × 340 m (2,760 ft × 1,120 ft).

In addition to light curve photometry, Torifune's elongated shape has been inferred from observations of stellar occultations. Only one occultation has been observed, with a single detection giving a chord length of 449 m (1,473 ft). Non-detections by other observers provided additional constraints to Torifune's location and shape, showing that it must be highly elongated with an equatorial axes ratio of b/a=0.37±0.09.

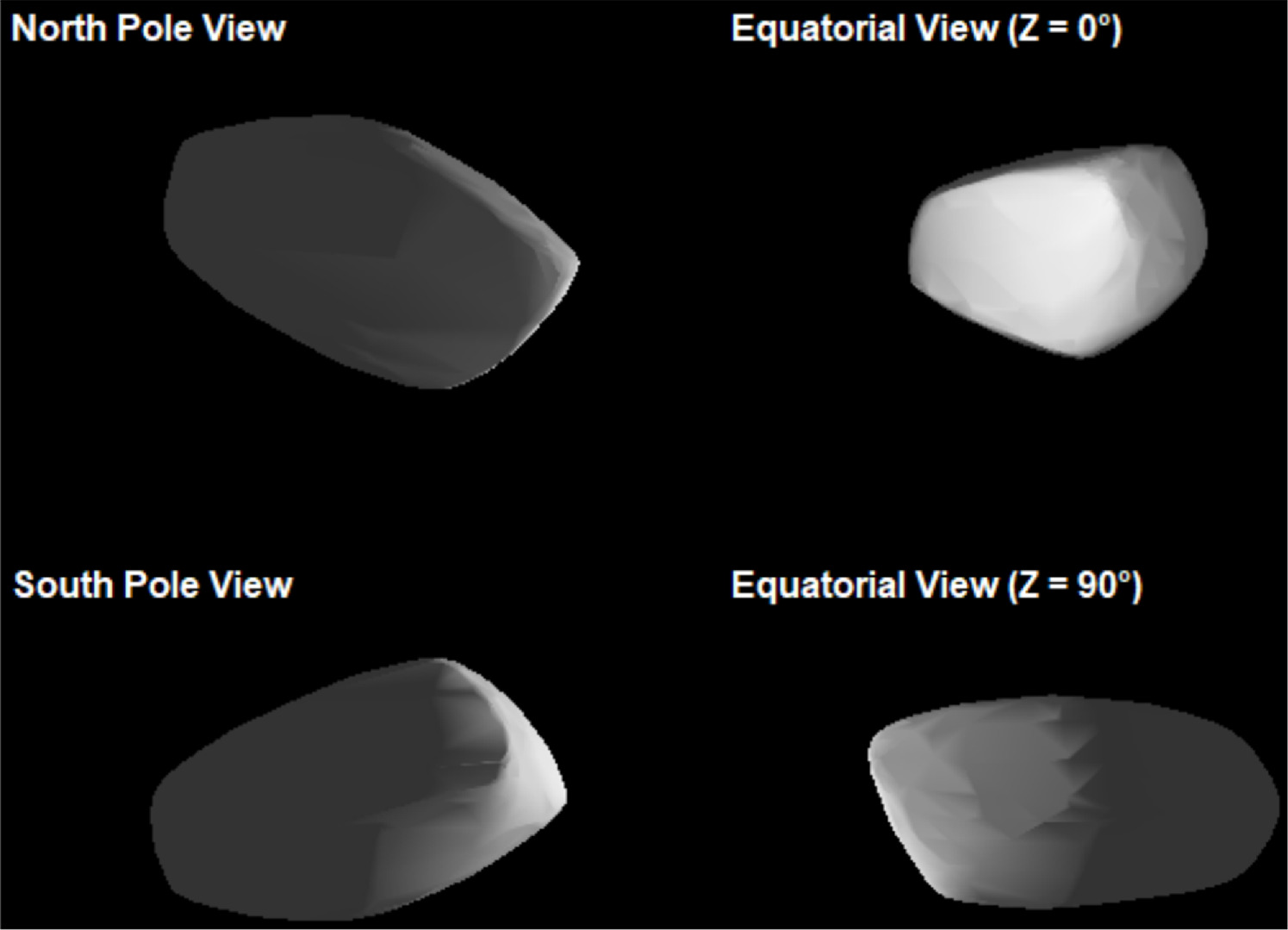
Convex shape model of Torifune derived from light curve inversion

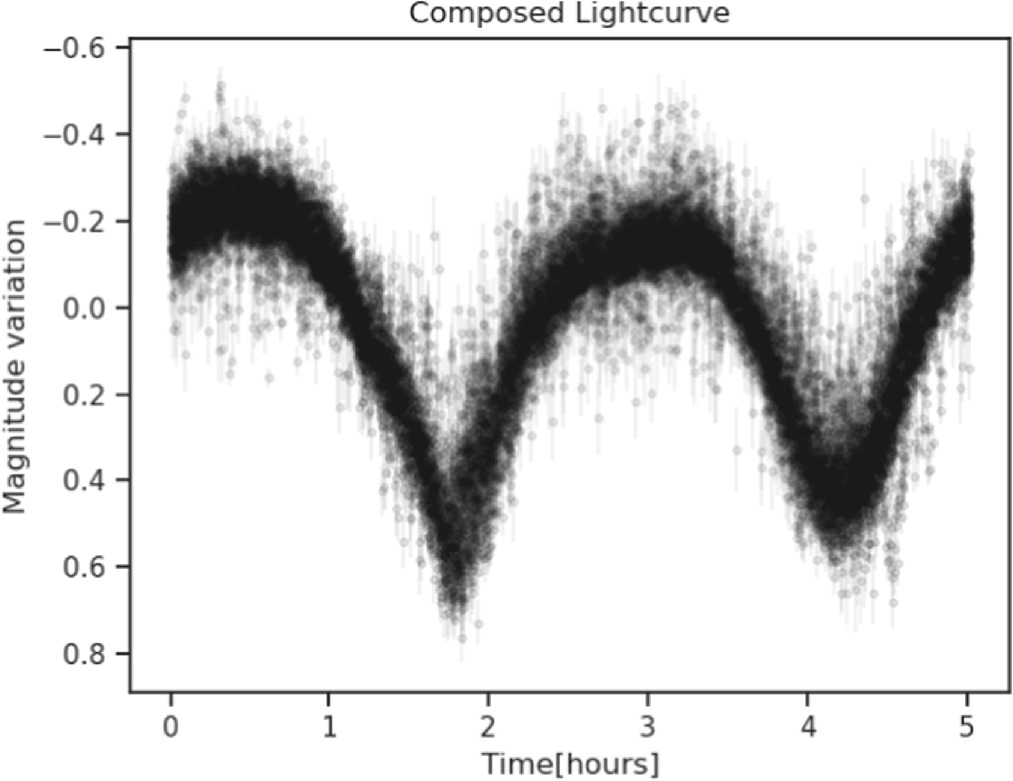
Torifune's brightness periodically changes as it rotates, as shown in its light curve

=== Surface albedo and composition ===
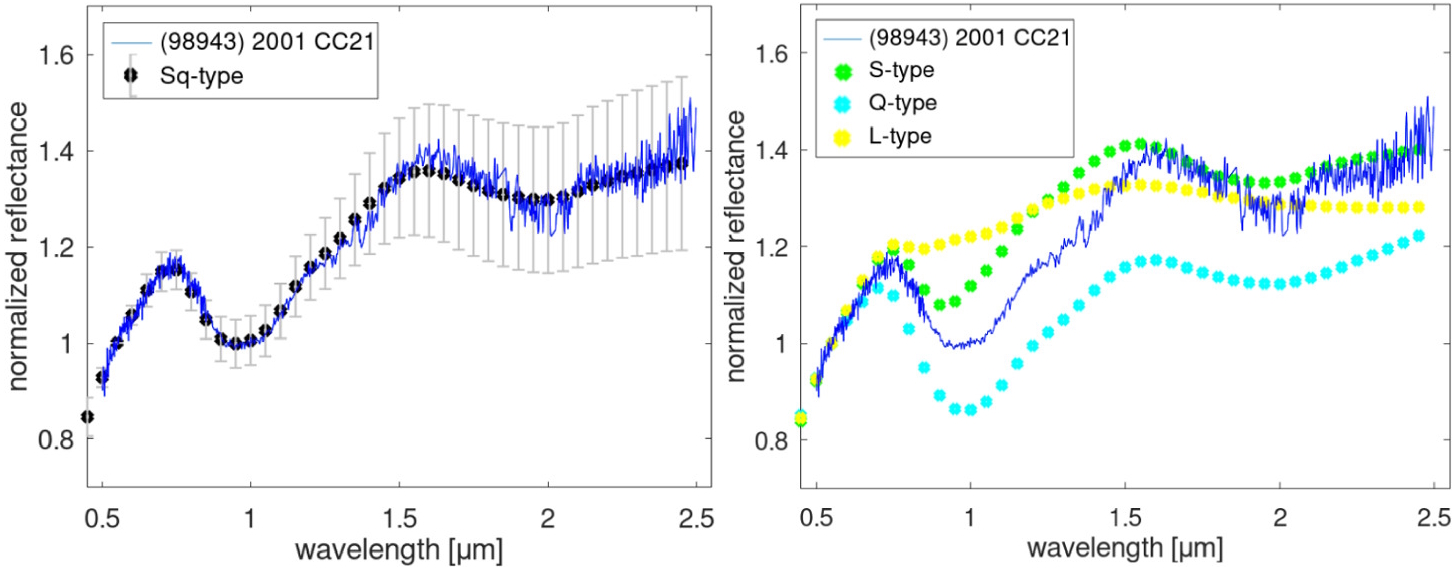
Visible and near-infrared spectrum of Torifune (blue) compared to the Sq (black), S (green), Q (cyan), and L (yellow) asteroid spectral types

Torifune's diameter and brightness in visible light can be used to derive its geometric albedo, though its uncertain absolute magnitude leads to uncertainties in albedo. Spectroscopy observations in the near-infrared show that it is a stony S-complex asteroid, with its spectrum best matching with the Sq subtype. Torifune was previously thought to be a calcium–aluminium-rich L-type asteroid when it was observed spectroscopically for the first time in 2004.

Torifune's spectral features show a surface composed mainly of the silicate minerals pyroxene and olivine (roughly 40% and 60%, respectively). The surface's mineralogy resembles that of L and LL chondrites, and it shows signs of moderate space weathering. Torifune's spectral features do not vary periodically, suggesting that its surface is broadly homogeneous.

== See also ==
- 162173 Ryugu, Hayabusa2's asteroid sample return target in 2018
- 1998 KY26, a tiny asteroid that was originally planned to be a flyby target of Hayabusa2 in 2031
- List of minor planets and comets visited by spacecraft
