= Science Journal for Kids =

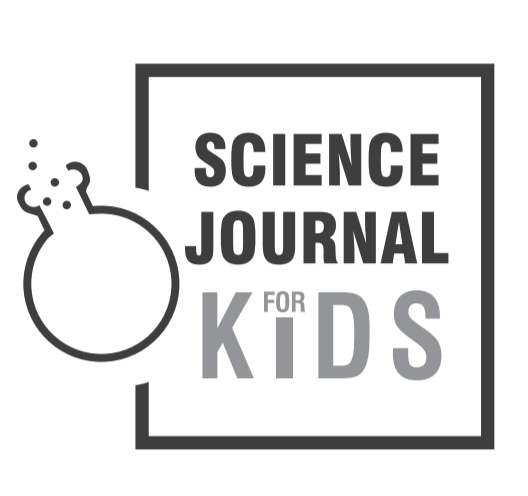
- Discipline: Science education
- Peer-reviewed: No
- Language: Multilingual (mostly English)
- Edited by: Tanya Dimitrova

Publication details
- Former names: Science Journal for Kids and Teens; Environmental Science Journal for Teens
- History: 2015–present
- Publisher: Science Journal for Kids
- Frequency: Continuous
- Open access: Yes
- License: Creative Commons Attribution 4.0

Standard abbreviations
- ISO 4: Sci. J. Kids

Indexing
- ISSN: 2575-9426
- OCLC no.: 1011046133

Links
- Journal homepage

Science Journal for Kids is an online scientific journal that publishes adaptations designed for children and teens of academic research papers that were originally published in high-impact peer-reviewed journals, as well as science teaching resources for teachers. It was established in 2015 and is published by a nonprofit 501(c)(3) organization of the same name. Thirty to forty journal articles are published each year. While most articles are published in English, some papers will be translated into Spanish, French, German, Bulgarian, Chinese, Arabic and any of 14 other languages. All articles can be downloaded for free.

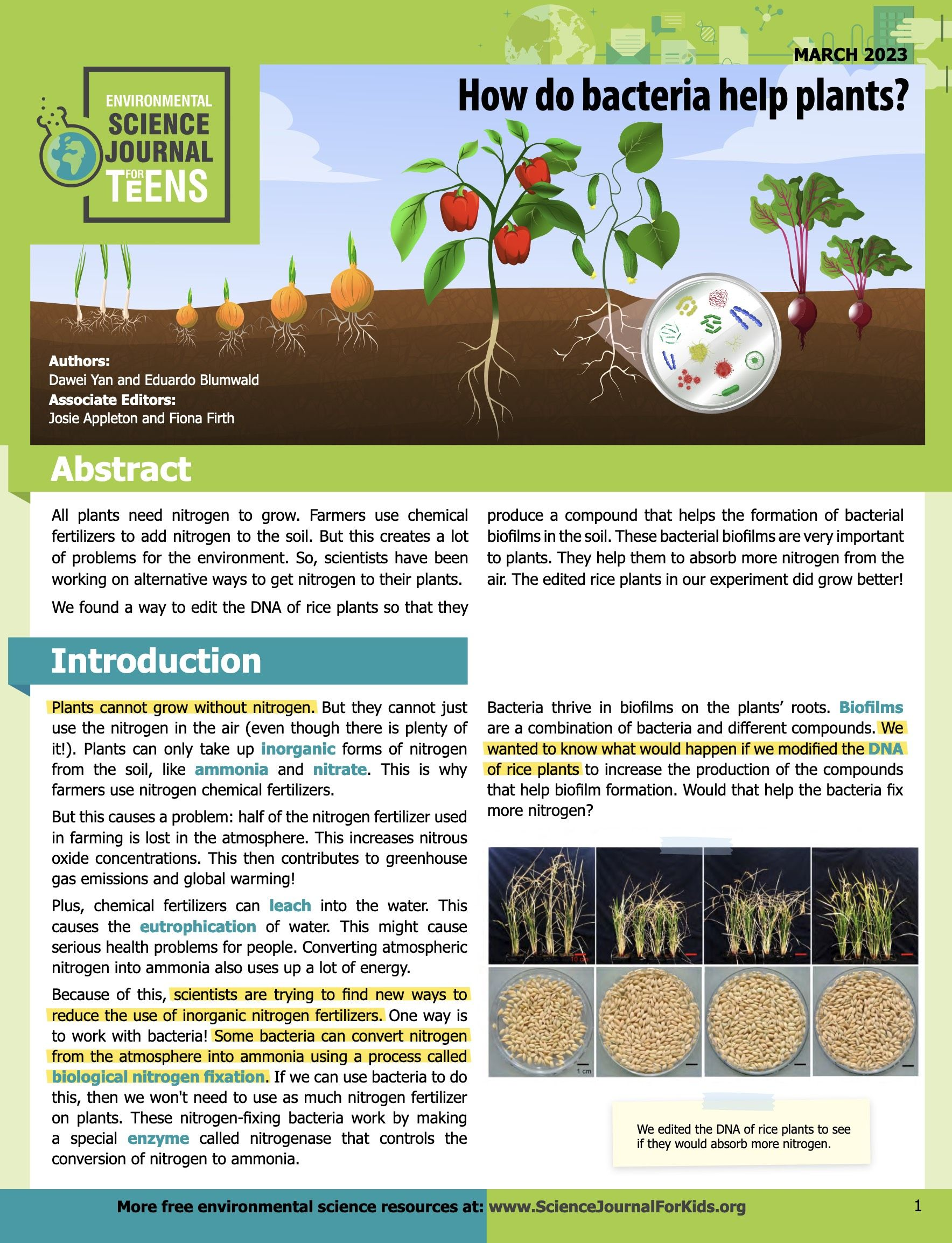
First page of a summary of a scientific paper about how bacteria help plants

== History ==
Tanya Dimitrova was teaching science at a Texas high school in 2015 when she assigned her class to create a 30 second summary of an academic research paper. Observing her students' difficulties inspired her to create summaries of scientific papers to make them more accessible to young readers. She also recruited a friend to add graphics to make them more appealing. This led to her forming Science Journal for Kids to create and publish research papers for kids and teens. As of 2023 over 300 articles had been published and there were an average of 1000 articles downloads per day. Most users are in the United States but other major countries include the United Kingdom, Canada, Australia, Mexico, India, Japan and China.

In 2021 they began publishing video versions of their articles. Beginning in 2023 video blackboard lessons based on Science Journal for Kids articles were published using the SJK Academy brand.

== Content ==
Published articles cover various scientific topics including biodiversity and conservation, biology, chemistry, energy and climate, food and agriculture, health and medicine, paleoscience, physical science, pollution, social science, technology and water resources.

== Educational impact ==
An impact assessment study in 2017 indicated that when exposed to these adapted articles, students scored significantly higher on a standardized exam measuring their understanding of scientific inquiry processes in comparison to a control group that used other science teaching materials.

== Article selection ==
Papers are chosen via high-school volunteers who browse science publications and suggest topics that will be of interest. Adaptation of these papers then proceeds by identifying issues and contexts that are of relevance to young people, and simplifying the language in correspondence with the original author.

== Funding ==
Various organizations and individuals provide donations and some researchers are able to use their lab's public outreach or discretionary funds to cover the cost of creating an article about their research paper.

== Criticism ==
Questions have arisen about an article's authorship and copyright issues related to the original research paper. "The researchers who wrote the original academic paper retain authorship of the adapted version. Our science writer and editor are listed as associate editors." "If the original paper appeared in an open-access academic journal (e.g. Nature Communications, PLOS), it is published under Creative Commons copyright, which means anyone can use it in any way they choose. If it was published in a subscription-based journal (e.g. Nature, PNAS), a kid’s adaptation of the research is legally considered fair use of the journal’s copyright (provided proper attribution) because it’s used for non-commercial educational purposes. In either case, we include a full citation and a link to the original paper in the adaptation’s references."
