= Communications Materials =

- Discipline: Materials science
- Language: English
- Edited by: John Plummer

Publication details
- History: 2020–present
- Publisher: Nature Portfolio
- Frequency: continuous, upon acceptance
- Open access: Yes
- License: Creative Commons Attribution
- Impact factor: 9.1 (2025)

Standard abbreviations
- ISO 4: Commun. Mater.

Indexing
- CODEN: CMOAGE
- ISSN: 2662-4443

Links
- Journal homepage; Online archive

Communications Materials is a peer-reviewed, open access, scientific journal in the field materials science published by Nature Portfolio since 2020. The chief editor is John Plummer. The journal was created as one of several sub-journals to Nature Communications.

== Abstracting and indexing ==
The journal is abstracted and indexed in selective databases such as Science Citation Index Expanded and Scopus.

== See also ==
- Nature
- Nature Communications
- Scientific Reports
