= Communications Medicine =

- Discipline: Medicine
- Language: English
- Edited by: Xin Sun

Publication details
- History: Since 2021
- Publisher: Nature Portfolio
- Frequency: continuous, upon acceptance
- Open access: Yes
- License: Creative Commons Attribution
- Impact factor: 7.4 (2025)

Standard abbreviations
- ISO 4: Commun. Med.

Indexing
- CODEN: CMOECM
- ISSN: 2730-664X

Links
- Journal homepage; Online archive

Communications Medicine is a peer-reviewed, open access, scientific journal in the field Medicine published by Nature Portfolio since 2021. The chief editor is Xin Sun. The journal was created as one of several sub-journals to Nature Communications.

== Abstracting and indexing ==
The journal is abstracted and indexed in selective databases such as Science Citation Index Expanded and Scopus. According to the Journal Citation Reports, the journal has a 2025 impact factor of 7.4.

== See also ==
- Nature
- Nature Communications
- Scientific Reports
