= Nathalie Le Bot =

French biologist, editor

Nathalie Le Bot is a French biologist and the chief life sciences editor of Nature Communications in the United Kingdom.

== Education ==
She graduated from the École normale supérieure (Paris), where she studied molecular and cell biology before joining the European Molecular Biology Laboratory graduate program in 1995.

== Career ==
As a university undergraduate, she studied molecular and cell biology at the ENS-Ulm in Paris, and joined the EMBL graduate programme in Heidelberg, Germany in 1995. After graduating, Le Bot undertook postdoctoral research at Gurdon Institute in Cambridge. where she studied early embryonic development in caenorhabditis elegans.

Le Bot served as senior editor for stem cells and development at Nature Cell Biology for 8 years and then at Nature for 5 years.

She joined the journal Nature Communications in 2019 and oversees the life and clinical sciences content published by the journal and its team of 60 editors. She is a member of the diversity, equity and inclusion working groups within the Nature portfolio. She is interested in innovations and approaches aimed at increasing transparency in reporting in peer-reviewed articles to help "research communities communicate their findings in a way that they can be used to advance science and help address the challenges faced by society."

=== Selected publications ===
- Le Bot, Nathalie, Claude Antony, Jamie White, Eric Karsenti, and Isabelle Vernos. "Role of xklp3, a subunit of the Xenopus kinesin II heterotrimeric complex, in membrane transport between the endoplasmic reticulum and the Golgi apparatus." The Journal of cell biology 143, no. 6 (1998): 1559-1573.
- Kamath RS, Fraser AG, Dong Y, Poulin G, Durbin R, Gotta M, Kanapin A, Le Bot N, Moreno S, Sohrmann M, Welchman DP., Systematic functional analysis of the Caenorhabditis elegans genome using RNAi, Nature, 2003, Jan;421(6920):231-7
- Le Bot, Nathalie, Miao-Chih Tsai, Robert K. Andrews, and Julie Ahringer. "TAC-1, a regulator of microtubule length in the C. elegans embryo." Current Biology 13, no. 17 (2003): 1499-1505.
- Le Bot, Nathalie. "Entosis: cell death by invasion." Nature cell biology 9, no. 12 (2007): 1346-1346.

== Family life ==
Le Bot lives in London.
