= Hayabusa2 =

Japanese space mission to asteroid Ryugu

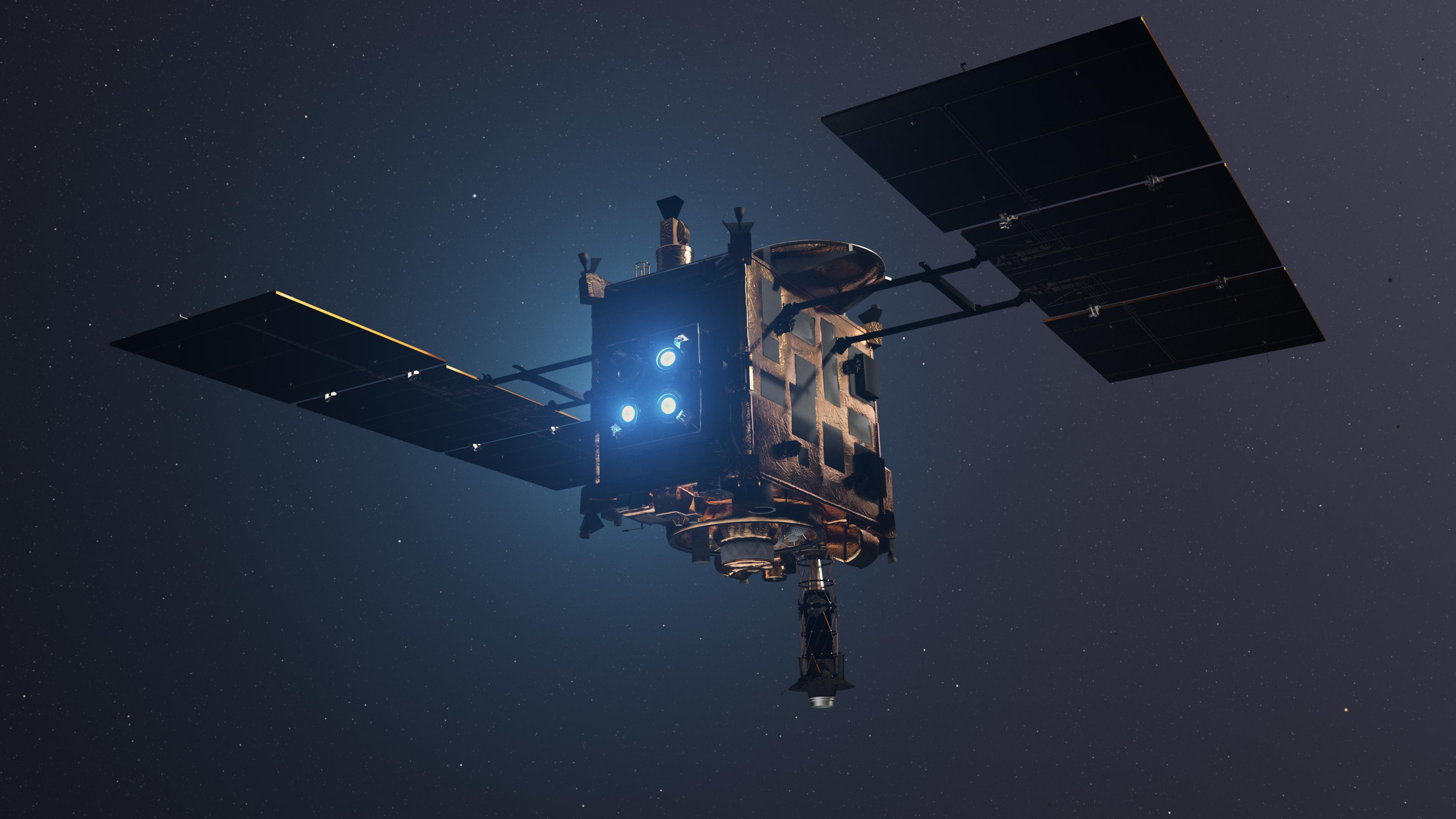
- Artist's impression of Hayabusa2 firing its ion thrusters
- Mission type: Asteroid sample-return
- Operator: JAXA
- COSPAR ID: 2014-076A
- SATCAT no.: 40319
- Website: www.hayabusa2.jaxa.jp/en/
- Mission duration: 6 years (planned) (11 years, 11 months and 17 days elapsed)

Spacecraft properties
- Spacecraft type: Hayabusa
- Manufacturer: NEC
- Launch mass: 600 kg
- Dry mass: 490 kg (1,080 lb)
- Dimensions: Spacecraft bus: 1 × 1.6 × 1.25 m (3 ft 3 in × 5 ft 3 in × 4 ft 1 in); Solar panel: 6 m × 4.23 m (19.7 ft × 13.9 ft)
- Power: 2.6 kW (at 1 au), 1.4 kW (at 1.4 au)

Start of mission
- Launch date: 3 December 2014, 04:22:04 UTC
- Rocket: H-IIA 202
- Launch site: Tanegashima Space Center, LA-Y
- Contractor: Mitsubishi Heavy Industries

End of mission
- Landing date: Re-entry capsule: 5 December 2020 UTC
- Landing site: Woomera, Australia

Flyby of Earth
- Closest approach: 3 December 2015
- Distance: 3,090 km (1,920 mi)

Rendezvous with (162173) Ryugu
- Arrival date: 27 June 2018, 09:35 UTC
- Departure date: 12 November 2019
- Sample mass: 5.4 grams(including gas samples)

(162173) Ryugu lander
- Landing date: 21 February 2019

(162173) Ryugu lander
- Landing date: 11 July 2019

Flyby of Earth (Sample return)
- Closest approach: 5 December 2020 UTC

Hayabusa2 (Japanese: はやぶさ2; lit. 'Peregrine falcon 2') is an asteroid sample-return mission operated by the Japanese state space agency JAXA. It is a successor to the Hayabusa mission, which returned asteroid samples for the first time in June 2010. Hayabusa2 was launched on 3 December 2014 and rendezvoused in space with near-Earth asteroid 162173 Ryugu on 27 June 2018. It surveyed the asteroid for a year and a half and took samples. It left the asteroid in November 2019 and returned the samples to Earth on 5 December 2020 UTC. Its mission was extended through at least 2028, during which it flew by the contact binary asteroid 98943 Torifune in July 2026, and has a planned flyby with the small, rapidly-spinning near-Earth asteroid 2015 BM510 in 2028.

Hayabusa2 carries multiple science payloads for remote sensing and sampling, and four small rovers to investigate the asteroid surface and analyze the environmental and geological context of the samples collected.

== Mission overview ==
Hayabusa2 mission overview animation

Animation of Hayabusa2 orbit from 3 December 2014 Hayabusa2 162173 Ryugu Earth Sun See detailed video including the extended mission

Asteroid 162173 Ryugu (formerly designated 1999 JU_{3}) is a primitive carbonaceous near-Earth asteroid. Carbonaceous asteroids are thought to preserve the most pristine, untainted materials in the Solar System, a mixture of minerals, ice, and organic compounds that interact with each other. Studying it is expected to provide additional knowledge on the origin and evolution of the inner planets and, in particular, the origin of water and organic compounds on Earth, all relevant to the origin of life on Earth.

Initially, launch was planned for 30 November 2014, but was delayed to 3 December 2014 at 04:22:04 UTC (3 December 2014, 13:22:04 local time) on a H-IIA launch vehicle. Hayabusa2 launched together with PROCYON asteroid flyby space probe. PROCYON's mission was a failure. Hayabusa2 arrived at Ryugu on 27 June 2018, where it surveyed the asteroid for a year and a half and collected samples. It departed the asteroid in November 2019 and returned the samples to Earth in December 2020.

Compared to the previous Hayabusa mission, the spacecraft features improved ion engines, guidance and navigation technology, antennas, and attitude control systems. A kinetic penetrator (a high-explosive shaped charge) was shot into the asteroid surface to expose pristine sample material which was later collected for return to Earth.

== Funding and history ==
Following the initial success of Hayabusa, JAXA began studying a potential successor mission in 2007. In July 2009, Makoto Yoshikawa of JAXA presented a proposal titled "Hayabusa Follow-on Asteroid Sample Return Missions". In August 2010, JAXA obtained approval from the Japanese government to begin development of Hayabusa2. The cost of the project estimated in 2010 was 16.4 billion yen (US$104 million).

Hayabusa2 was launched on 3 December 2014, arrived at asteroid Ryugu on 27 June 2018, and remained stationary at a distance of about 20 km (12 mi) to study and map the asteroid. In the week of 16 July 2018, commands were sent to move to a lower hovering altitude.

On 21 September 2018, the Hayabusa2 spacecraft ejected the first two rovers, Rover-1A (HIBOU) and Rover-1B (OWL), from about a 55 m (180 ft) altitude that dropped independently to the surface of the asteroid. They functioned nominally and transmitted data. The MASCOT rover deployed successfully on 3 October 2018 and operated for about 16 hours as planned.

The first sample collection was scheduled to start in late October 2018, but the rovers encountered a landscape with large and small boulders but no surface soil for sampling. Therefore, it was decided to postpone the sample collection plans to 2019 and further evaluate various options for the landing. The first surface sample retrieval took place on 21 February 2019. On 5 April 2019, Hayabusa2 released an impactor to create an artificial crater on the asteroid surface. However, Hayabusa2 initially failed on 14 May 2019 to drop reflective markers necessary onto the surface for guiding the descent and sampling processes, but later it successfully dropped one from an altitude of 9 m (30 ft) on 4 June 2019. The sub-surface sampling took place on 11 July 2019. The spacecraft departed the asteroid on 13 November 2019 (with departure command sent at 01:05 UTC on 13 November 2019). It successfully delivered the samples back to Earth on 6 December 2020 (JST), dropping the contents by parachute in a special container at a location in southern Australia. The samples were retrieved the same day for secure transport back to the JAXA labs in Japan.

After Hayabusa2 completed its primary mission, its mission was extended, and it continued orbiting the Sun using its remaining propellant so that it could visit more asteroids along its flight path. The probe successfully flew-by asteroid 98943 Torifune in July 2026, and it will flyby the micro-asteroid 2015 BM510 in 2028.

== Spacecraft ==
Hayabusa2	Performance
Propulsion	μ10 ion thruster
Number of thrusters	4 (one is a spare)
Total thrust (ion drive)	28 mN
Specific impulse (I_{sp})	3000 seconds
Acceleration	49 μm/s^{2}
Power	1250 W
Spacecraft wet mass	600 kg
Ion engine system dry mass	66 kg
Ion engine system wet mass	155 kg
Solar array	23 kg
Xenon propellant	66 kg
Hydrazine/MON-3 propellant	48 kg
Thrust (chemical propellants)	20 N

The design of Hayabusa2 is based on the first Hayabusa spacecraft, with some improvements. It has a mass of 600 kilograms (1,300 lb) including fuel, and electric power is generated by two sets of solar arrays with an output of 2.6 kW at 1 AU, and 1.4 kW at 1.4 AU. The power is stored in eleven inline-mounted 13.2 Ah lithium-ion batteries.

Propulsion

The spacecraft features four solar-electric ion thrusters for propulsion called μ10, one of which is a backup. These engines use microwaves to convert xenon into plasma (ions), which are accelerated by a voltage applied by the solar panels and ejected out the back of the engine. The simultaneous operation of three engines generates thrusts of up to 28 mN. Although this thrust is very small, the engines are also extremely efficient; the 66 kg (146 lb) of xenon reaction mass can change the speed of the spacecraft by up to 2 km/s.

The spacecraft has four redundant reaction wheels and a chemical reaction control system featuring twelve thrusters for attitude control (orientation) and orbital control at the asteroid. The chemical thrusters use hydrazine and MON-3, with a total mass of 48 kg (106 lb) of chemical propellant.

Communication

The primary contractor NEC built the 590 kg (1,300 lb) spacecraft, its Ka-band communications system and a mid-infrared camera. The spacecraft has two high-gain directional antennas for X-band and K_{a}-band. Bit rates are 8 bit/s to 32 kbit/s. The ground stations are the Usuda Deep Space Center, Uchinoura Space Center, NASA Deep Space Network and Malargüe Station (ESA).

Navigation

The optical navigation camera telescope (ONC-T) is a telescopic framing camera with seven colors to optically navigate the spacecraft. It works in synergy with the optical navigation camera wide-field (ONC-W2) and with two star trackers.

In order to descend to the asteroid surface to perform sampling, the spacecraft released one of five target markers in the selected landing zones as artificial guide marks, with highly reflective outer material that is recognized by a strobe light mounted on the spacecraft. The spacecraft also used its laser altimeter and ranging (LIDAR) as well as Ground Control Point Navigation (GCP-NAV) sensors during sampling.

== Firsts ==
The Hayabusa2 spacecraft was the first to deploy operating rovers on an asteroid.

== Science payload ==
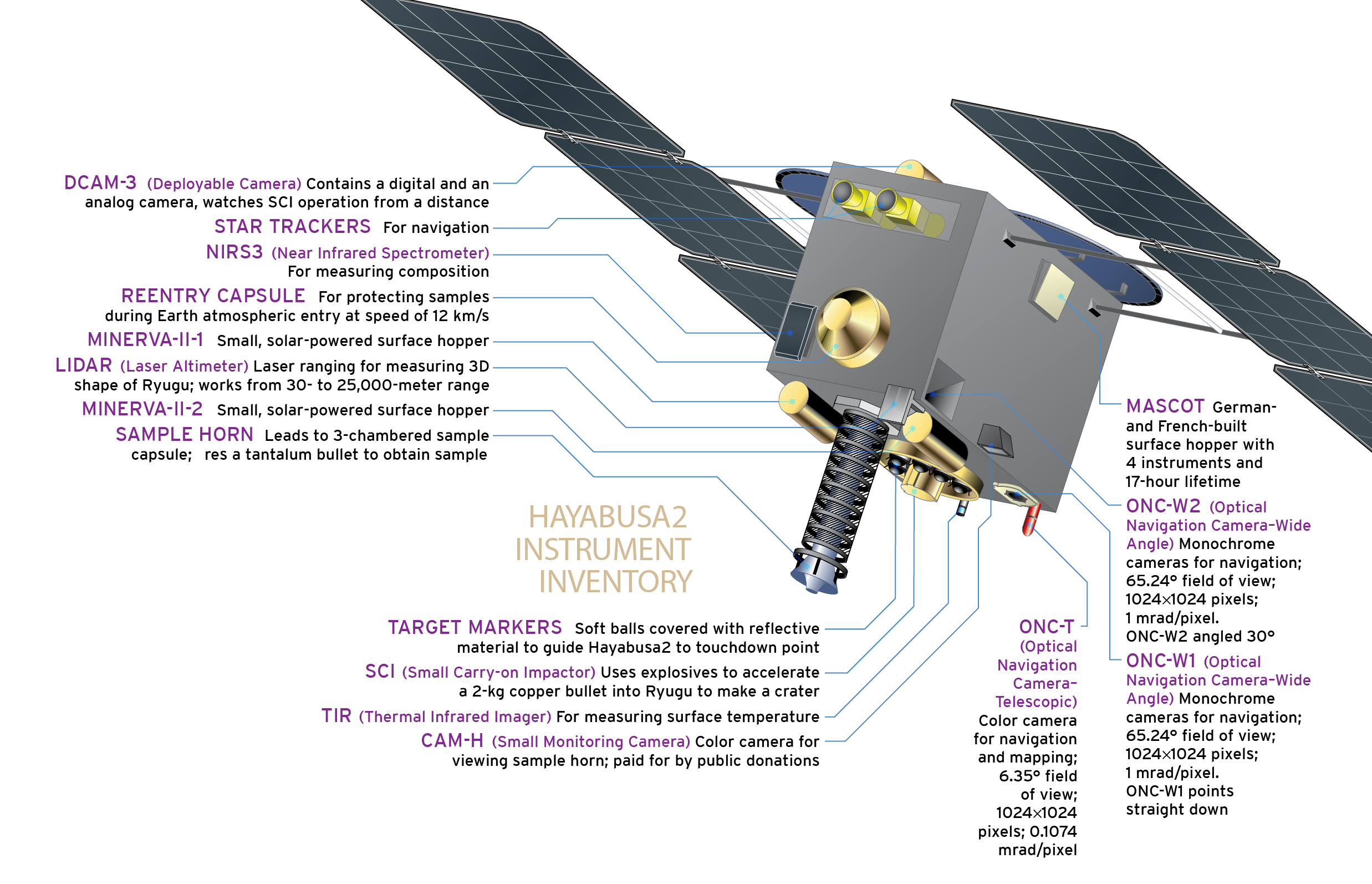
Hayabusa2 instrument inventory

The Hayabusa2 payload is equipped with multiple scientific instruments:

- Remote sensing: Optical Navigation Camera (ONC-T, ONC-W1, ONC-W2), Near-Infrared Camera (NIR3), Thermal-Infrared Camera (TIR), Light Detection And Ranging (LIDAR)
- Sampling: Sampling device (SMP), Small Carry-on Impactor (SCI), Deployable Camera (DCAM3)
- Four rovers: Mobile Asteroid Surface Scout (MASCOT), Rover-1A, Rover-1B, Rover-2.

=== Remote sensing ===
The Optical Navigation Cameras (ONCs) were used for spacecraft navigation during the asteroid approach and proximity operations. They also remotely imaged the surface to search for interplanetary dust around the asteroid. ONC-T is a telephoto camera with a 6.35° × 6.35° field of view and several optical filters carried in a carousel. ONC-W1 and ONC-W2 are wide angle (65.24° × 65.24°) panchromatic (485–655 nm) cameras with nadir and oblique views, respectively.

The Near-Infrared Spectrometer (NIRS3) is a spectrograph operating at a wavelength of 1.8–3.2 μm. NIRS3 was used for analysis of surface mineral composition.

The Thermal-Infrared Imager (TIR) is a thermal infrared camera working at 8–12 μm, using a two-dimensional microbolometer array. Its spatial resolution is 20 m at 20 km distance or 5 cm at 50 m distance (70 ft at 12 mi, or 2 in at 160 ft). It was used to determine surface temperatures in the range −40 to 150 °C (−40 to 302 °F).

The Light Detection And Ranging (LIDAR) instrument measured the distance from the spacecraft to the asteroid surface by measuring the reflected laser light. It operated over an altitude range between 30 m and 25 km (100 ft and 16 mi).

When the spacecraft was closer to the surface than 30 m (98 ft) during the sampling operation, the Laser Range Finders (LRF-S1, LRF-S3) were used to measure the distance and the attitude (orientation) of the spacecraft relative to the terrain. The LRF-S2 monitored the sampling horn to trigger the sampling projectile.

LIDAR and ONC data are being combined to determine the detailed topography (dimensions and shape) of the asteroid. Monitoring of a radio signal from Earth allowed measurement of the asteroid's gravitational field.

== Rovers ==
Hayabusa2 carried four small rovers to explore the asteroid surface in situ, and provide context information for the returned samples. Due to the minimal gravity of the asteroid, all four rovers were designed to move around by short hops instead of using normal wheels. They were deployed at different dates from about 60 m (200 ft) altitude and fell freely to the surface under the asteroid's weak gravity. The first two rovers, called HIBOU (previously Rover-1A) and OWL (previously Rover-1B), landed on asteroid Ryugu on 21 September 2018. The third rover, called MASCOT, was deployed 3 October 2018. Its mission was successful. The fourth rover, known as Rover-2 or MINERVA-II-2, failed before release from the orbiter. It was released on 2 October 2019 to orbit the asteroid and perform gravitational measurements before being allowed to impact the asteroid a few days later.

=== MINERVA-II ===
The first photograph from the surface of an asteroid, taken by HIBOU on 22 September 2018 during one of its "hops".

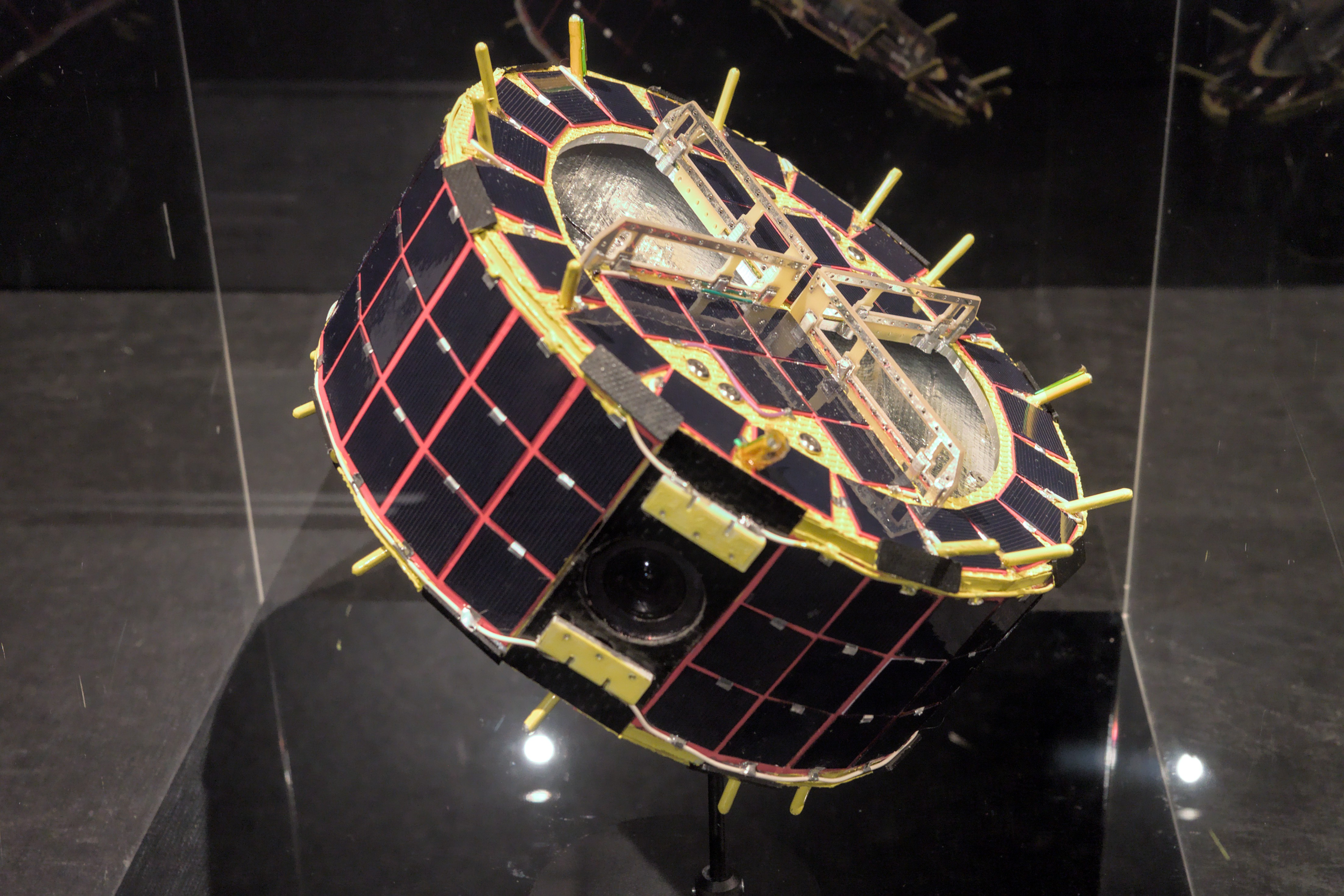
Model of MINERVA-II-1 Rover 1B

MINERVA-II is a successor to the MINERVA lander carried by Hayabusa. It consists of two containers with 3 rovers. MINERVA-II-1 is a container that deployed two rovers, Rover-1A (HIBOU) and Rover-1B (OWL), on 21 September 2018. It was developed by JAXA and the University of Aizu. The rovers are identical having a cylindrical shape, 18 cm (7.1 in) diameter and 7 cm (2.8 in) tall, and a mass of 1.1 kg (2.4 lb) each. They move by hopping in the low gravitational field, using a torque generated by rotating masses within the rovers. Their scientific payload is a stereo camera, wide-angle camera, and thermometers. Solar cells and double-layer capacitors provide the electrical power. The MINERVA-II-1 rovers were successfully deployed 21 September 2018. Both rovers performed successfully on the asteroid surface, sending images and video from the surface. Rover-1A operated for 113 asteroid days (36 Earth days) returning 609 images from the surface, and Rover-1B operated for 10 asteroid days (3 Earth days) returning 39 images from the surface.

The MINERVA-II-2 container held the ROVER-2 (sometimes referred to as MINERVA-II-2), developed by a consortium of universities led by Tohoku University in Japan. This was an octagonal prism shape, 15 cm (5.9 in) diameter and 16 cm (6.3 in) tall, with a mass of about 1 kg (2.2 lb). It had two cameras, a thermometer and an accelerometer. It was equipped with optical and ultraviolet LEDs to illuminate and detect floating dust particles. ROVER-2 carried four mechanisms to move around using short hops. Rover-2 had problems prior to deployment from the orbiter but was released on 2 October 2019 to orbit the asteroid and perform gravitational measurements. It was then crashed onto the asteroid surface a few days later on 8 October 2019.

=== MASCOT ===
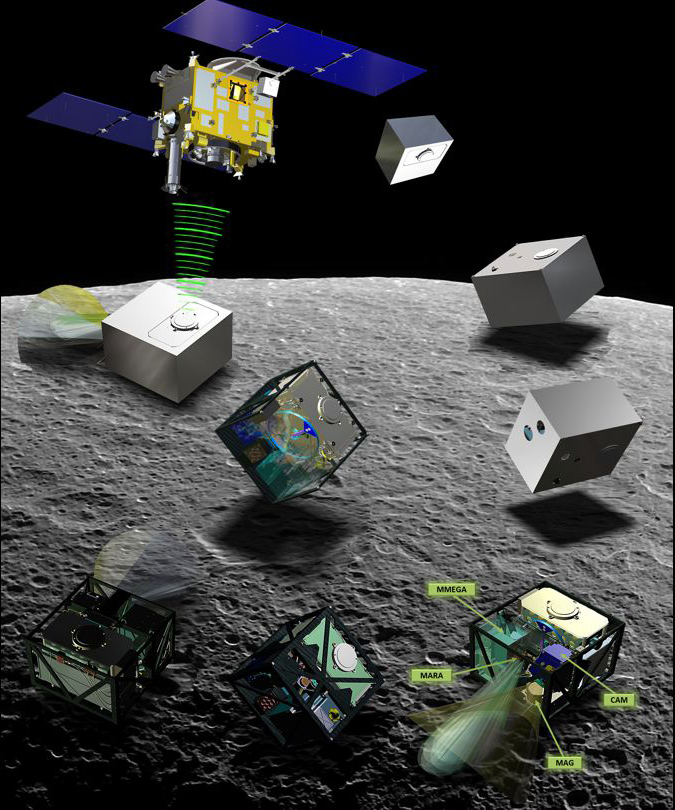
Mission overview

The Mobile Asteroid Surface Scout (MASCOT) was developed by the German Aerospace Center (DLR) in cooperation with the French space agency CNES. Its dimensions measure 29.5 cm × 27.5 cm × 19.5 cm (11.6 in × 10.8 in × 7.7 in) and it weighs 9.6 kg (21 lb). MASCOT carries four instruments: an infrared spectrometer (MicrOmega), a magnetometer (MASMAG), a radiometer (MARA), and a camera (MASCAM) that imaged the small-scale structure, distribution and texture of the regolith. The rover is capable of tumbling once to reposition itself for further measurements. It collected data on the surface structure and mineralogical composition, the thermal behaviour and the magnetic properties of the asteroid. It has a non-rechargeable battery that allowed for operations for approximately 16 hours. The infrared radiometer on the InSight Mars lander, launched in 2018, is based on the MASCOT radiometer.

MASCOT was deployed on 3 October 2018, with a successful landing and ensuing surface mission. Two papers were published describing the results from MASCOT in the scientific journals Nature Astronomy and Science. One finding of the research was that C-type asteroids consist of more porous material than previously thought, explaining a deficit of this meteorite type. Meteorites of this type are too porous to survive the entry into the atmosphere of planet Earth. Another finding was that Ryugu consists of two different almost black types of rock with little internal cohesion, but no dust was detected. A third paper describing results from MASCOT was published in the Journal of Geophysical Research and describes the magnetic properties of Ryugu, showing that Ryugu does not have a magnetic field on a boulder scale.

== Objects deployed by Hayabusa2 ==
Object	Developed by	Mass	Dimensions	Power	Science payload	Landing or deployed date	Status
MINERVA-II-1 rovers: Rover-1A (HIBOU); Rover-1B (OWL)	JAXA and University of Aizu	1.1 kg (2.4 lb) each	Diameter: 18 cm (7.1 in); Height: 7 cm (2.8 in)	Solar panels	Wide-angle camera, stereo camera, thermometers	21 September 2018	Successful landing. Rover-1A operated for 36 days and Rover-1B operated for 3 days.
Rover-2 (MINERVA-II-2)	Tohoku University	1.0 kg (2.2 lb)	Diameter: 15 cm (5.9 in); Height: 16 cm (6.3 in)	Solar panels	Two cameras, thermometer, accelerometer. Optical and ultraviolet LEDs for illumination	Released: 2 October 2019, 16:38 UTC	Rover failed before deployment, so it was released in orbit around the asteroid to perform gravitational measurements before it impacted a few days later.
MASCOT	German Aerospace Center and CNES	9.6 kg (21 lb)	29.5 cm × 27.5 cm × 19.5 cm (11.6 in × 10.8 in × 7.7 in)	Non-rechargeable battery	Camera, infrared spectrometer, magnetometer, radiometer	3 October 2018	Successful landing. Operated on battery for more than 17 hours
Deployable camera 3 (DCAM3)	JAXA	about 2 kg (4.4 lb)	Diameter: 7.8 cm (3.1 in); Height: 7.8 cm (3.1 in)	Non-rechargeable battery	DCAM3-A lens, DCAM3-D lens	5 April 2019	Deployed to observe impact of SCI impactor. Inactive now and presumed to have fallen on the asteroid.
Small Carry-On Impactor (SCI)	JAXA	2.5 kg (5.5 lb)	Diameter: 30 cm (12 in); Height: 21.7 cm (8.5 in)	Non-rechargeable battery	None	5 April 2019	Successful. Shot to the surface 40 minutes after separation.
Target Marker B	JAXA	300 g (11 oz)	10 cm (3.9 in) sphere	None	None	25 October 2018	Successful. Used for first touchdown.
Target Marker A	JAXA	300 g (11 oz)	10 cm (3.9 in) sphere	None	None	30 May 2019	Successful. Used for second touchdown.
Target Marker E (Explorer)	JAXA	300 g (11 oz)	10 cm (3.9 in) sphere	None	None	17 September 2019	Successful. Injected to equatorial orbit and confirmed to land.
Target Marker C (Sputnik/Спутник)	JAXA	300 g (11 oz)	10 cm (3.9 in) sphere	None	None	17 September 2019	Successful. Injected to polar orbit and confirmed to land.
Target Marker D	JAXA	300 g (11 oz)	10 cm (3.9 in) sphere	None	None	—	Was not deployed.
Sample Return Capsule	JAXA	16 kg	Diameter: 40 cm Height: 20 cm	Non-rechargeable battery	Sample container, Reentry flight Environment Measurement Module	5 December 2020 UTC	Successful landing. All the parts including the sample container were collected.

== Sampling ==
Sampling	Date
1st surface sampling	21 February 2019
Sub-surface sampling	SCI impactor: 5 April 2019; Target marker: 5 June 2019; Sampling: 11 July 2019
2nd surface sampling	Optional; was not done.

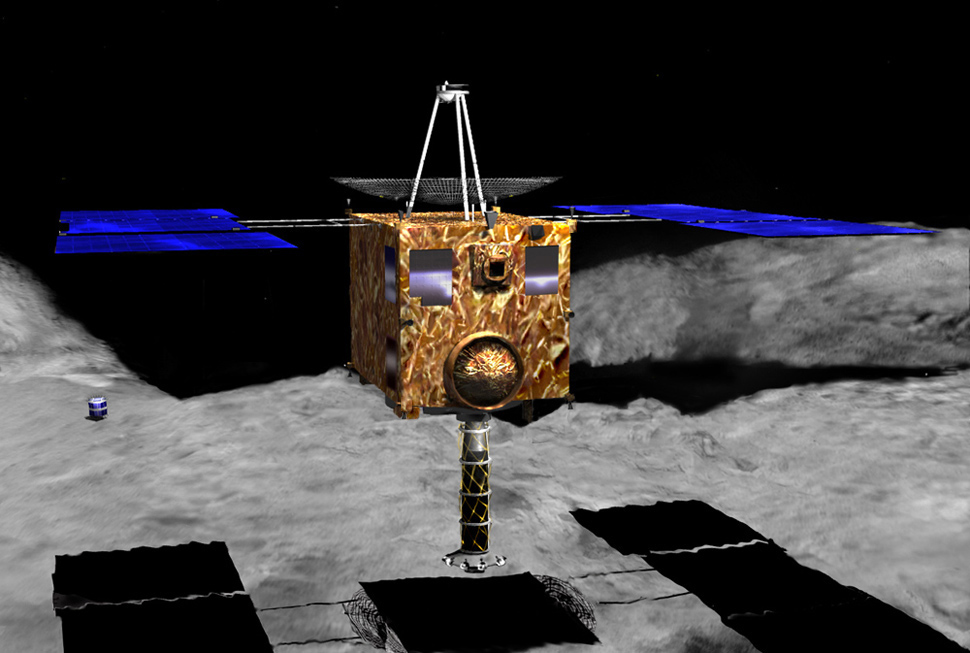
Artistic rendering of Hayabusa collecting a surface sample.

The original plan was for the spacecraft to collect up to three samples: 1) surface material that exhibits traits of hydrous minerals; 2) surface material with either unobservable or weak evidence of aqueous alterations; 3) excavated sub-surface material.

The first two surface samples were scheduled to start in late October 2018, but the rovers showed large and small boulders and insufficient surface area to sample, so the mission team decided to postpone sampling to 2019 and evaluate various options. The first surface sampling was completed on 22 February 2019 and obtained a substantial amount of topsoil, so the second surface sampling was postponed and was eventually cancelled to decrease the risks to the mission.

The second and final sample was collected from material that was dislodged from beneath the surface by the kinetic impactor (SCI impactor) shot from a distance of 300 m (980 ft). All samples are stored in separate sealed containers inside the sample return capsule (SRC).

=== Surface sample ===
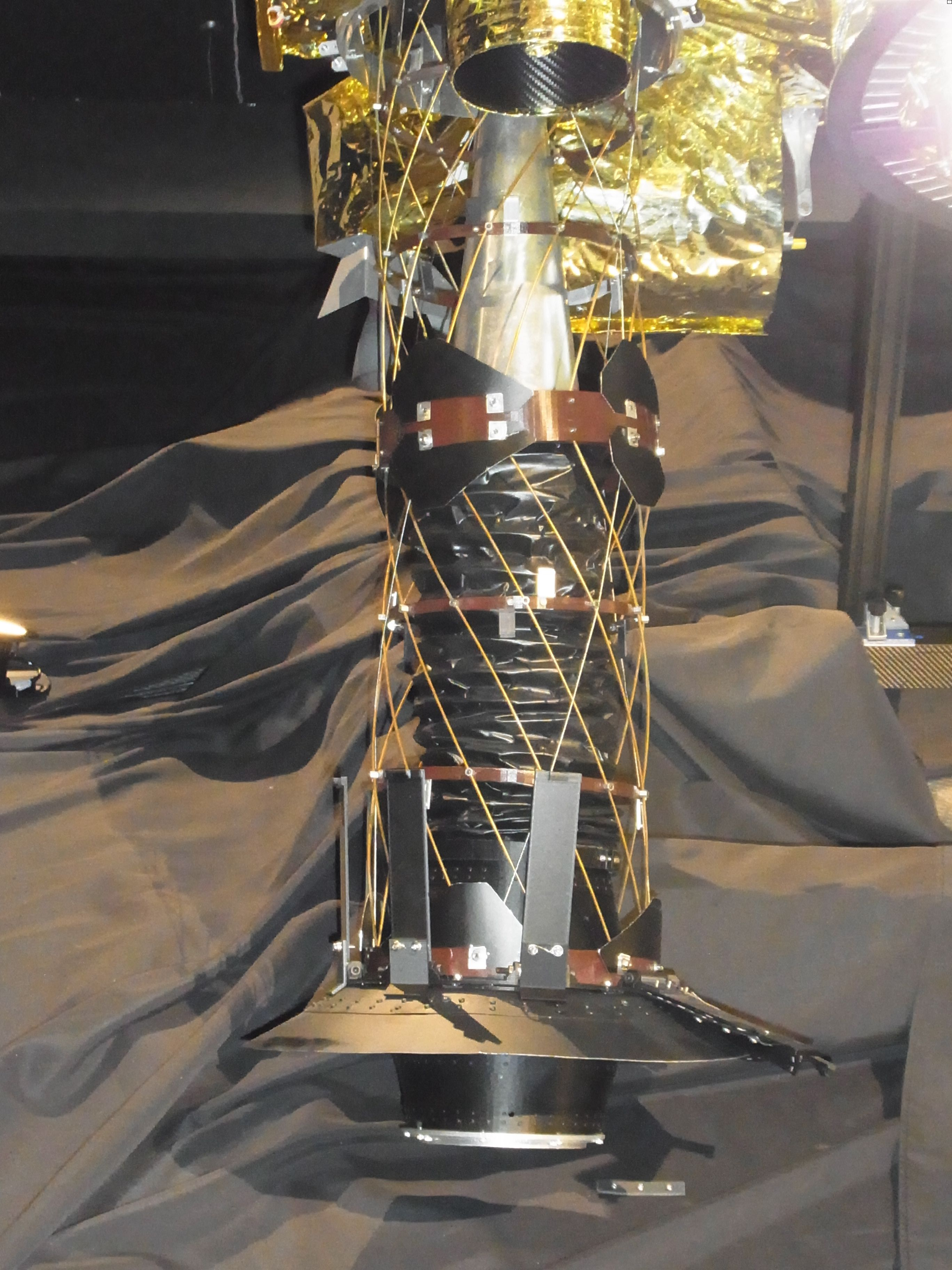
Sampler horn

Hayabusa2's sampling device is based on Hayabusa's. The first surface sample retrieval was conducted on 21 February 2019, which began with the spacecraft's descent, approaching the surface of the asteroid. When the sampler horn attached to Hayabusa2's underside touched the surface, a 5 g (0.18 oz) tantalum projectile (bullet) was fired at 300 m/s (980 ft/s) into the surface. The resulting ejected materials were collected by a "catcher" at the top of the horn, which the ejecta reached under their own momentum under microgravity conditions.

=== Sub-surface sample ===
Animation illustrating SCI deployment and subsequent sampling from the resulting crater.

The sub-surface sample collection required an impactor to create a crater in order to retrieve material under the surface, not subjected to space weathering. This required removing a large volume of surface material with a powerful impactor. For this purpose, Hayabusa2 deployed on 5 April 2019 a free-flying gun with one "bullet", called the Small Carry-on Impactor (SCI); the system contained a 2.5 kg (5.5 lb) copper projectile, shot onto the surface with an explosive propellant charge. Following SCI deployment, Hayabusa2 also left behind a deployable camera (DCAM3) (Note: DCAM3 is numbered as such because it is a follow-on to the DCAM1 and DCAM2 used for the IKAROS interplanetary solar sail) to observe and map the precise location of the SCI impact, while the orbiter maneuvered to the far side of the asteroid to avoid being hit by debris from the impact.

It was expected that the SCI deployment would induce seismic shaking of the asteroid, a process considered important in the resurfacing of small airless bodies. However, post-impact images from the spacecraft revealed that little shaking had occurred, indicating the asteroid was significantly less cohesive than was expected.

The touchdown on and sampling of Ryugu on 11 July, 2019

Approximately 40 minutes after separation, when the spacecraft was at a safe distance, the impactor was fired into the asteroid surface by detonating a 4.5 kg (9.9 lb) shaped charge of plasticized HMX for acceleration. The copper impactor was shot onto the surface from an altitude of about 500 m (1,600 ft) and it excavated a crater of about 10 m (33 ft) in diameter, exposing pristine material. The next step was the deployment on 4 June 2019 of a reflective target marker in the area near the crater to assist with navigation and descent. The touchdown and sampling took place on 11 July 2019.

== Sample return ==
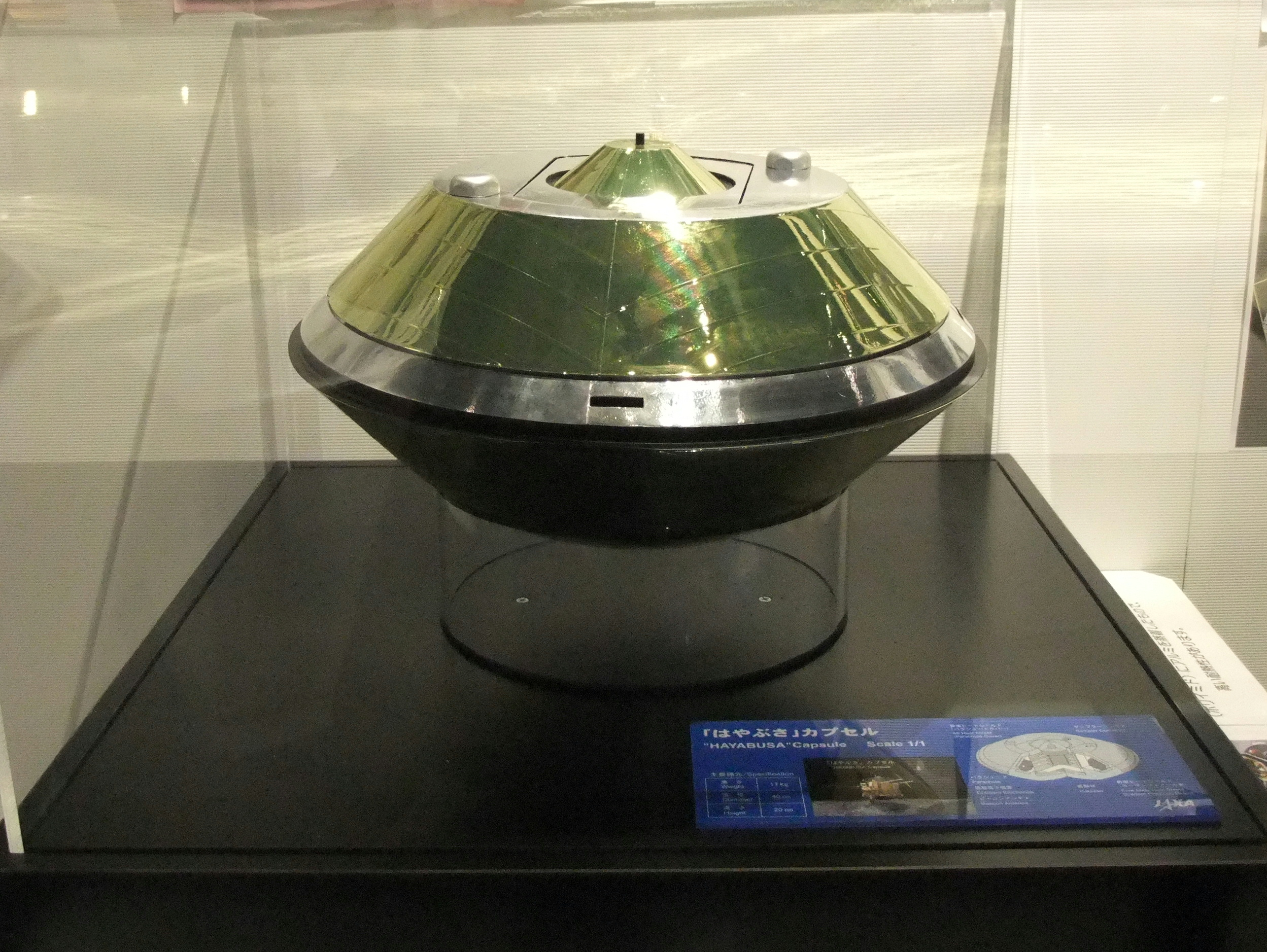
Replica of Hayabusa's sample-return capsule (SRC) used for re-entry. Hayabusa2's capsule is of the same size, measuring 40 cm (16 in) in diameter and using a parachute for touchdown.

The spacecraft collected and stored the samples in separate sealed containers inside the sample-return capsule (SRC), which is equipped with thermal insulation. The container is 40 cm (16 in) external diameter, 20 cm (7.9 in) in height, and a mass of about 16 kg (35 lb).

At the end of the science phase in November 2019, Hayabusa2 used its ion engines to change orbit and return to Earth. Hours before Hayabusa2 flew past Earth in late 2020, it released the capsule, on 5 December 2020 at 05:30 UTC. The capsule was released spinning at one revolution per three seconds, and re-entered the Earth's atmosphere at 12 km/s (7.5 mi/s). Deploying a radar-reflective parachute at an altitude of about 10 km (6.2 mi), it ejected its heat shield while transmitting a position beacon signal. The sample capsule landed at the Woomera Test Range in Australia. The total flight distance was 5.24×10^{9} km (35.0 AU).

Any volatile substances will be collected before the sealed containers are opened. The samples will be curated and analyzed at JAXA's Extraterrestrial Sample Curation Center, where international scientists can request a small portion of the samples. The spacecraft brought back a capsule containing carbon-rich asteroid fragments that scientists believe could provide clues about the ancient delivery of water and organic molecules to Earth.

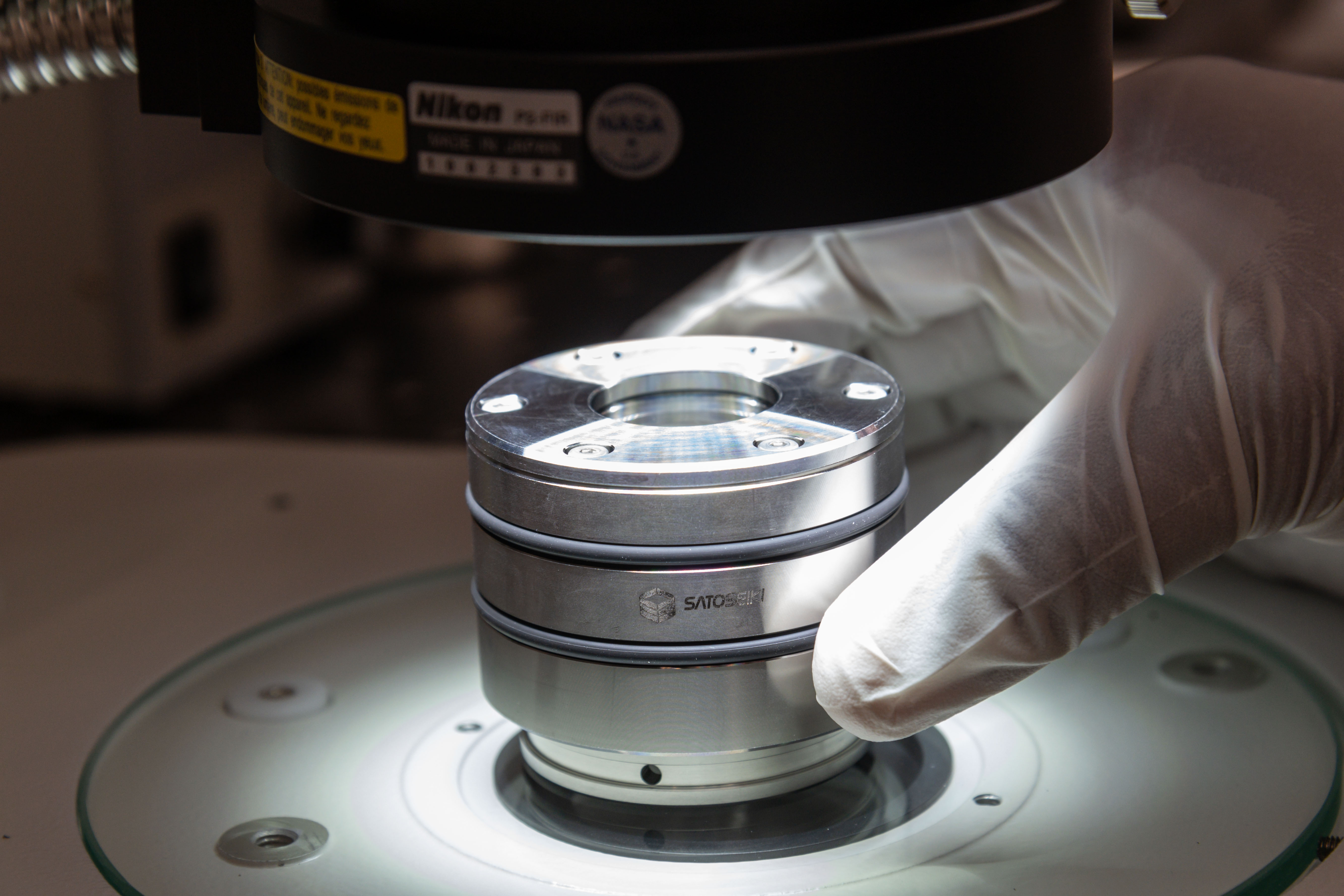
One of the facility-to-facility transfer containers (FFTC) of Hayabusa2 returned samples given to NASA by JAXA.

JAXA is sharing a portion of these samples with NASA. In exchange, NASA is providing JAXA a percentage of a sample from asteroid Bennu, after the agency's OSIRIS-REx spacecraft returned to Earth from the space rock on 24 September 2023.

A November 2024 study published in Meteoritics & Planetary Science examined a sample returned from the asteroid Ryugu by the Hayabusa2 mission. Despite stringent contamination control measures, terrestrial microorganisms rapidly colonized the sample. Researchers concluded that the observed microbial growth originated from Earthly contamination during sample preparation rather than being indigenous to the asteroid. This finding underscores the difficulty of preventing microbial contamination, even in highly controlled laboratory environments.

== Mission extension (Hayabusa2♯) ==
Animation of Hayabusa2 orbit – extended mission Hayabusa2 · 162173 Ryugu · Earth · Sun · 98943 Torifune · 1998 KY26

With the successful return and retrieval of the sample capsule on 6 December 2020 (JST), Hayabusa2 is planned to use its remaining 30 kg (66 lb) of xenon propellant (from the initial 66 kg (146 lb)) to extend its service life and fly out to explore new targets. JAXA announced a mission extension for Hayabusa2 in 2020. This extended mission, titled the Small Hazardous Asteroid Reconnaissance Probe (SHARP or ♯), tasked the spacecraft to visit two more near-Earth asteroids: 98943 Torifune in July 2026 and a rendezvous with 1998 KY_{26} in July 2031. These asteroids were chosen because they required a low amount of fuel (Δv < 1.6 km/s) to reach within 10 years. JAXA presented the initial plan in July 2020 with the choice of visiting either 1998 KY_{26} or 2001 AV43, and ultimately selected 1998 KY_{26} in September 2020.

However, in November 2026, JAXA announced that they had abandoned their plan to visit 1998 KY_{26} due to engine problems preventing Hayabusa2 from being able to make critical trajectory changes. Hayabusa2 will instead be redirected to perform a flyby of the 17–74 m (56–243 ft)-sized near-Earth asteroid 2015 BM510 in 2028.

Hayabusa2♯ extended mission timeline:

- December 2020: Extension mission start
- 2021 until July 2026: cruise operation
- July 2026: 98943 Torifune high-speed flyby
- 2028: 2015 BM510 flyby

=== Torifune flyby ===
Hayabusa2 successfully flew by the S-type asteroid 98943 Torifune in July 2026. The encounter and observation of the asteroid were conducted at a high relative speed (5 km/s), however the probe was able to successfully image the asteroid in great detail despite this limitation. The probe revealed that Torifune is a rubble pile and contact binary strewn with boulders of different sizes.

=== 2015 BM_{510} flyby ===
Hayabusa2 will perform a flyby of rapidly-rotating D-type near-Earth asteroid 2015 BM510 sometime in 2028. It will both be the first D-type near-Earth asteroid and rapidly-rotating asteroid visited by a spacecraft.

=== Planned 1998 KY_{26} rendezvous and landing ===
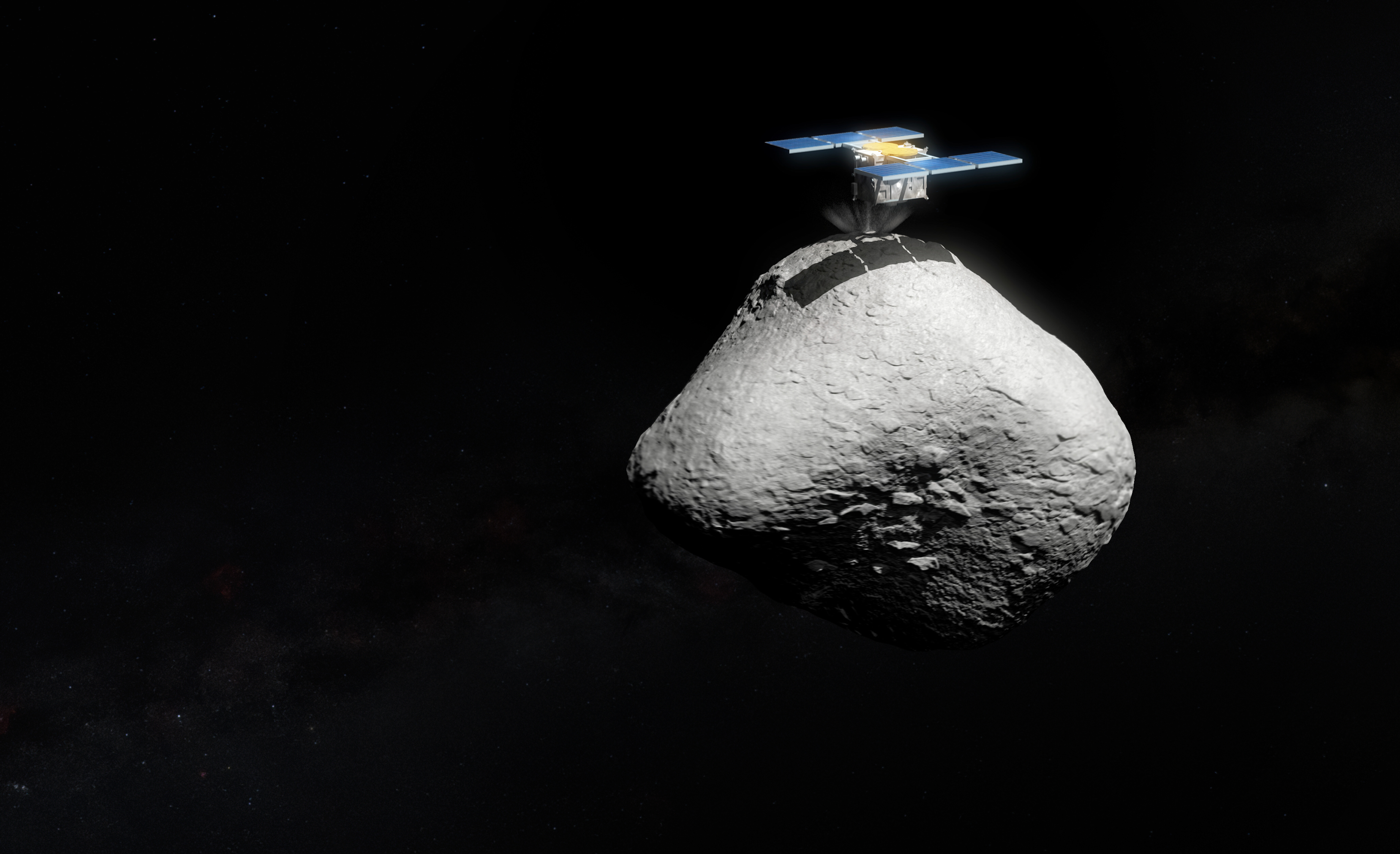
Artist's impression of the Hayabusa2 spacecraft landing on 1998 KY26

Before 1998 KY_{26} was abandoned, Hayabusa2 was intended to take the following path after its Torifune flyby:

- December 2027: Earth swing-by
- June 2028: Second Earth swing-by
- July 2031: Target body (1998 KY26) rendezvous

Had Hayabusa2 arrived at 1998 KY26, the asteroid would have become the smallest visited by a spacecraft. The exploration of 1998 KY_{26} would have provided insights into the properties of decameter-sized asteroids, which would have aided planetary defense efforts. During its rendezvous, Hayabusa2 would have slowly approached 1998 KY_{26} and then enter orbit around the asteroid. The spacecraft would have attempted to create an impact crater on 1998 KY_{26} by deploying its final remaining target marker and projectile. Hayabusa2 would have then attempted to land on the surface of 1998 KY_{26}. Due to the asteroid's rapid rotation, landing on its surface would be challenging; the safest place for Hayabusa2 to land would be the asteroid's poles, where centrifugal forces are minimal.

== See also ==
- Abiogenesis
- Hayabusa Mk2 – Proposed Japanese space mission
- OSIRIS-REx – NASA asteroid sample return mission to 101955 Bennu (operational at the same time as Hayabusa2)
- Panspermia

=== Japanese minor body probes ===
- Hiten (spacecraft) – 1990 Japanese lunar probe
- Martian Moons eXploration – Japanese sample-return mission to Phobos
- OKEANOS – Proposed space probe to Trojan asteroids
- Suisei spacecraft
