= Communications Chemistry =

- Discipline: Chemistry
- Language: English
- Edited by: Victoria Richards

Publication details
- History: 2018–present
- Publisher: Nature Portfolio
- Frequency: continuous, upon acceptance
- Open access: Yes
- License: Creative Commons Attribution
- Impact factor: 6.2 (2024)

Standard abbreviations
- ISO 4: Commun. Chem.

Indexing
- CODEN: CCOHCT
- ISSN: 2399-3669
- OCLC no.: 1099283354

Links
- Journal homepage; Online archive

Communications Chemistry is a peer-reviewed, open access, scientific journal in the field chemistry published by Nature Portfolio since 2018.The chief editor is Victoria Richards. Communications Chemistry was created as a sub-journal to Nature Communications along with Communications Biology and Communications Physics.

== Abstracting and indexing ==
The journal is abstracted and indexed in:

- Chemical Abstracts Service (CAS)
- Current Contents/Physical, Chemical and Earth Sciences
- Journal Citation Reports/Science Edition
- Science Citation Index
- Scopus

According to the Journal Citation Reports, the journal has a 2024 impact factor of 6.2, ranking it 50st out of 239 journals in the category "Chemistry, Multidisciplinary".

== See also ==
- Nature
- Nature Communications
- Scientific Reports
