= Communications Physics =

- Discipline: Physics
- Language: English
- Edited by: Elena Belsole

Publication details
- History: 2018–present
- Publisher: Nature Portfolio
- Frequency: continuous, upon acceptance
- Open access: Yes
- License: Creative Commons licenses
- Impact factor: 5.8 (2024)

Standard abbreviations
- ISO 4: Commun. Phys.

Indexing
- CODEN: CPOHDJ
- ISSN: 2399-3650
- OCLC no.: 1027768393

Links
- Journal homepage; Online archive

Communications Physics is a peer-reviewed and open access, scientific journal in the field physics published by Nature Portfolio since 2018. The chief editor is Elena Belsole. It was created as a sub-journal to Nature Communications along with Communications Biology and Communications Chemistry.

== Abstracting and indexing ==
The journal is abstracted and indexed in:

- Current Contents/Physical, Chemical and Earth Sciences
- EBSCO Information Services
- Ei Compendex
- Inspec
- ProQuest databases
- Science Citation Index Expanded
- Scopus

According to the Journal Citation Reports, the journal has a 2024 impact factor of 5.8.

== See also ==
- Nature
- Nature Communications
- Scientific Reports
