= Communications Biology =

- Discipline: Biology
- Language: English
- Edited by: Christina Karlsson Rosenthal

Publication details
- History: 2018–present
- Publisher: Nature Portfolio
- Frequency: Continuous, upon acceptance
- Open access: Yes
- License: Creative Commons licenses
- Impact factor: 5.8 (2025)

Standard abbreviations
- ISO 4: Commun. Biol.

Indexing
- CODEN: CBOIDQ
- ISSN: 2399-3642
- LCCN: 2018243098
- OCLC no.: 1023437316

Links
- Journal homepage; Online archive

Communications Biology is a peer-reviewed open access scientific journal covering research in biology. It was established in 2018 and is published by Nature Portfolio. It is a sister journal to Communications Physics and Communications Chemistry.

As of 2024 the editor-in-chief is Christina Karlsson Rosenthal.

== Abstracting and indexing ==
The journal is abstracted and indexed in:

- Biological Abstracts
- BIOSIS Previews
- CAB abstracts
- Current Contents/Life Sciences
- Index Medicus/MEDLINE/PubMed
- Science Citation Index Expanded
- Scopus
- The Zoological Record

According to the Journal Citation Reports, the journal has a 2025 impact factor of 5.8, ranking it 9th out of 106 journals in the category "Biology".

== See also ==
- Nature
- Nature Communications
- Scientific Reports
