= 2015 BM510 =

2015 BM_{510}
Discovery
- Discovered by: Pan-STARRS
- Discovery site: Haleakalā Observatory

Designations
- Minor planet category: Aten · NEO

Orbital characteristics
- Epoch 2026 June 09 (JD 2461200.5) TDB
- Uncertainty parameter 1
- Observation arc: 8403 days (23.01 years)
- Aphelion: 1.0626 AU
- Perihelion: 0.8328 AU
- Semi-major axis: 0.9477 AU
- Eccentricity: 0.1212
- Orbital period (sidereal): 336.9767 d (0.9226 years)
- Mean anomaly: 351.6098°
- Mean motion: 1° 4^{m} 5.88^{s} / day
- Inclination: 1.5908°
- Longitude of ascending node: 267.6498°
- Argument of perihelion: 357.7717°
- Earth MOID: 0.0238 AU
- Jupiter MOID: 3.95543 AU
- T_{Jupiter}: 6.337

Physical characteristics
- Sidereal rotation period: 0.806 h
- Absolute magnitude (H): 25.04

2015 BM_{510} is a near-Earth asteroid in the Aten asteroid group. It is a small, dark asteroid between 17 meters (56 feet) and 74 meters (243 feet) in diameter, completing a rotation every 49 minutes.

== Exploration ==
2015 BM_{510} is an upcoming target of the Japan Aerospace Exploration Agency's Hayabusa2 spacecraft in its extended mission. The flyby is scheduled for 2028, following ion engine issues that prevented the spacecraft from visiting 1998 KY26.

== See also ==
- 1998 KY26, the previous target of Hayabusa2
