= Nature Communications =

Scientific journal

- Discipline: Natural sciences
- Language: English
- Edited by: Nathalie Le Bot, Stephane Larochelle, Enda Bergin, Prabhjot Saini

Publication details
- History: 2010–present
- Publisher: Nature Portfolio
- Frequency: Continuous
- Open access: Yes
- License: Creative Commons licenses
- Impact factor: 18.1 (2025)

Standard abbreviations
- ISO 4: Nat. Commun.

Indexing
- CODEN: NCAOBW
- ISSN: 2041-1723
- OCLC no.: 614340895

Links
- Journal homepage; Online access; Online archive

Nature Communications is a peer-reviewed, open access, scientific journal published by Nature Portfolio since 2010. It is a multidisciplinary journal that covers the natural sciences, including physics, chemistry, earth sciences, medicine, and biology. The journal has editorial offices in London, Berlin, New York City, and Shanghai.

The founding editor-in-chief was Lesley Anson, followed by Joerg Heber, Magdalena Skipper, and Elisa De Ranieri. As of 2022, the editors are Nathalie Le Bot for health and clinical sciences, Stephane Larochelle for biological sciences, Enda Bergin for chemistry and biotechnology, and Prabhjot Saini for physics and earth sciences. Starting October 2014, the journal only accepted submissions from authors willing to pay an article processing charge. Until the end of 2015, part of the published submissions were only available to subscribers. In January 2016, all content became freely accessible.

Starting from 2017, the journal offers a deposition service to authors for preprints of articles "under consideration" as part of the submission process.

== Abstracting and indexing ==
The journal is abstracted and indexed in:

- Science Citation Index Expanded
- Current Contents/Agriculture, Biology & Environmental Sciences
- Current Contents/Life Sciences
- Current Contents/Physical, Chemical & Earth Sciences
- The Zoological Record
- BIOSIS Previews
- Chemical Abstracts Service
- Index Medicus/MEDLINE/PubMed
- Scopus

According to the Journal Citation Reports, the journal has a 2025 impact factor of 18.1.

== Subjournals ==
In 2017, the creation of three "subjournals" under the Communications brand was announced: Communications Biology, Communications Chemistry, and Communications Physics. In the following years several additional Communications journals were established: Communications Materials in 2020, Communications Earth & Environment in 2020, Communications Medicine in 2021, Communications Engineering in 2022 and Communications Psychology in 2022.

These open-access journals offer a lower publication fee than Nature Communications, reflecting their more specialist remits. Manuscripts rejected by Nature Publishing Group journals can choose to transfer the manuscript together with reviewers' reports to the Communications-branded journals via an automated transfer service. Alternatively, authors may choose to request a fresh review.

== See also ==
- Nature (journal)
- Science Advances
- Scientific Reports
