= 2001 AV43 =

Very small monolithic asteroid and fast rotator

2001 AV_{43}
Discovery
- Discovered by: LINEAR
- Discovery site: Lincoln Laboratory ETS
- Discovery date: 5 January 2001

Designations
- Minor planet category: NEO · Apollo

Orbital characteristics
- Epoch 21 November 2025 (JD 2461000.5)
- Uncertainty parameter 0
- Observation arc: 13.23 yr (4,834 d)
- Aphelion: 1.5928 AU
- Perihelion: 0.9744 AU
- Semi-major axis: 1.2836 AU
- Eccentricity: 0.2409
- Orbital period (sidereal): 1.45 yr (531 d)
- Mean anomaly: 82.580°
- Mean motion: 0° 40^{m} 39.72^{s} / day
- Inclination: 0.2007°
- Longitude of ascending node: 20.528°
- Argument of perihelion: 51.279°
- Earth MOID: 0.0017 AU · 0.66 LD

Physical characteristics
- Mean diameter: 0.03 km (derived)
- Synodic rotation period: 0.1701 h (612 s)
- Geometric albedo: 0.20 (assumed)
- Spectral type: S (assumed)
- Absolute magnitude (H): 24.6; 24.9

2001 AV_{43} is a very small, monolithic asteroid and fast rotator, classified as a near-Earth object of the Apollo group, approximately 30 meters (98 feet) in diameter. It was first observed on 5 January 2001, by astronomers of the LINEAR program at Lincoln Laboratory's Experimental Test Site near Socorro, New Mexico, in the United States. The presumed S-type asteroid has a rotation period of only 10 minutes. It has an exceptionally low MOID of 0.66 lunar distance (LD) and will approach Earth at 0.81 LD on 11 November 2029.

== Orbit and classification ==
2001 AV_{43} is a member of the dynamical Apollo group, which are Earth-crossing asteroids. Apollo asteroids are the largest subgroup of near-Earth objects. Unlike many Apollo asteroids, this asteroid is not a Mars-crosser, as its aphelion is smaller than the orbit of the Red Planet at 1.66 AU.

This asteroid orbits the Sun at a distance of 0.97–1.59 AU once every 17 months (531 days; semi-major axis of 1.28 AU). Its orbit has an eccentricity of 0.24 and an inclination of 0° with respect to the ecliptic. The body's observation arc begins with a precovery found in ESO's Astrovirtel data archive (I03), in August 2000, less than 5 months prior to its official discovery observation at Socorro.

=== Close approaches ===
2001 AV_{43} has an Earth minimum orbital intersection distance of 0.0017 AU (254,000 km), which translates into 0.7 lunar distances (LD). Due to its small size, that is, an absolute magnitude fainter than 22, this asteroid is not classified as a potentially hazardous asteroid.

On 18 November 2013, the asteroid passed Earth at 2.7 LD. The angle of approach made it a good target for radar observations.

On 11 November 2029, the orbit of 2001 AV_{43} is predicted to bring the asteroid within a nominal distance of 0.00209 AU (313,000 km; 194,000 mi) or 0.81 LD of Earth. It will also pass the Moon at an even shorter nominal distance of 0.00166 AU (248,000 km; 154,000 mi)

== Physical characteristics ==
2001 AV_{43} is an assumed stony S-type asteroid.

=== Rotation period ===
A rotational lightcurve of 2001 AV_{43} was obtained from photometric observations by American astronomers Robert J. Whiteley, Carl Hergenrother and David Tholen. Lightcurve analysis gave a rotation period of 0.1701 hours (612 second) with a brightness amplitude of 0.26 magnitude (U=2). With such a short period, it is a notable fast rotator. The observers classified it as a "monolithic fast-rotating asteroid" (MFRA).

=== Diameter and albedo ===
The Collaborative Asteroid Lightcurve Link assumes a standard albedo for stony asteroids of 0.20 and derives a diameter of 0.03 kilometers based on an absolute magnitude of 24.9.

== Numbering and naming ==
As of 2018, this minor planet has neither been numbered nor named.
