= List of cities by scientific output =

The following article lists the cities and metropolitan areas with the greatest scientific output, according to the Nature Index. The Nature Index attempts to objectively measure the scientific output of institutions, cities and countries by the amount of scientific articles and papers published in leading journals. Differences in quality are taken into account. Only articles published in 82 (Note: The current complete list of the 82 leading scientific journals, as of September 2022, are: ACS Nano, Advanced Functional Materials, Advanced Materials, American Journal of Human Genetics, Analytical Chemistry, Angewandte Chemie International Edition, Applied Physics Letters, Astronomy & Astrophysics, Cancer Cell, Cancer Research, Cell, Cell Host & Microbe, Cell Metabolism, Cell Stem Cell, Chemical Communications, Chemical Science, Current Biology, Developmental Cell, Earth and Planetary Science Letters, Ecology Letters, eLife, Environmental Science & Technology, European Physical Journal C, Genes & Development, Genome Research, Geochimica et Cosmochimica Acta, Geology, Geophysical Research Letters, Immunity, Inorganic Chemistry, Journal of Biological Chemistry, Journal of Cell Biology, Journal of Clinical Investigation, Journal of Experimental Medicine, Journal of Geophysical Research: Atmospheres, Journal of Geophysical Research: Solid Earth, Journal of High Energy Physics, Journal of Neuroscience, Journal of the American Chemical Society, Macromolecules, Molecular Cell, Molecular Psychiatry, Monthly Notices of the Royal Astronomical Society Letters, Nano Letters, Nature, Nature Biotechnology, Nature Cell Biology, Nature Chemical Biology, Nature Chemistry, Nature Climate Change, Nature Communications, Nature Genetics, Nature Geoscience, Nature Immunology, Nature Materials, Nature Medicine, Nature Methods, Nature Nanotechnology, Nature Neuroscience, Nature Photonics, Nature Physics, Nature Structural & Molecular Biology, Neuron, Organic Letters, Physical Review A, Physical Review B, Physical Review D, Physical Review Letters, Physical Review X, PLOS Biology, PLOS Genetics, Proceedings of the National Academy of Sciences of the United States of America, Proceedings of the Royal Society B, Science, Science Advances, Science Translational Medicine, The Astrophysical Journal Letters, The EMBO Journal, The ISME Journal: Multidisciplinary Journal of Microbial Ecology, The Journal of Physical Chemistry Letters, The Plant Cell, and Water Research.) selected quality journals are counted. All these journals are in the English language. They were selected by a committee. If authors from several institutions from different cities are involved in a scientific article, it is divided accordingly, assuming that all researchers were equally involved in the article.

In 2025, Beijing was the city in the world with the largest scientific output, followed by Shanghai in second and New York City in third. Overall, China has the most cities in the top 100 list with 28, followed by the United States with 27.

== List ==
Listed below are the top 100 cities and metropolitan areas with the highest share of articles published in scientific journals in 2024, according to the Nature Index 2025 Science Cities:

Rank	City/Metro area	Country/Region
1	Beijing	China
2	Shanghai	China
3	New York metropolitan area	United States
4	Boston metropolitan area	United States
5	Nanjing	China
6	Guangzhou	China
7	San Francisco Bay Area	United States
8	Wuhan	China
9	Baltimore-Washington	United States
10	Hangzhou	China
11	Tokyo	Japan
12	Hefei	China
13	Seoul	South Korea
14	Paris	France
15	Tianjin	China
16	Xi'an	China
17	Los Angeles	United States
18	Shenzhen	China
19	London	United Kingdom
20	Hong Kong	Hong Kong
21	Chengdu	China
22	Chicago	United States
23	Changsha	China
24	Changchun	China
25	Singapore	Singapore
26	Philadelphia	United States
27	Jinan	China
28	Zürich	Switzerland
29	Cambridge	United Kingdom
30	Munich	Germany
31	Qingdao	China
32	Berlin	Germany
33	Suzhou	China
34	San Diego	United States
35	Chongqing	China
36	Seattle	United States
37	Houston	United States
38	Oxford	United Kingdom
39	Melbourne	Australia
40	Xiamen	China
41	Fuzhou	China
42	Dalian	China
43	Harbin	China
44	Toronto	Canada
45	Atlanta	United States
46	Ann Arbor	United States
47	Copenhagen	Denmark
48	Lanzhou	China
49	Sydney	Australia
50	Barcelona	Spain
51	Madrid	Spain
52	Daejeon	South Korea
53	Stockholm	Sweden
54	Montreal	Canada
55	Lausanne	Switzerland
56	Vienna	Austria
57	Kyoto	Japan
58	Zhengzhou	China
59	Pittsburgh	United States
60	St. Louis	United States
61	Amsterdam metropolitan area	Netherlands
62	Taipei	Taiwan (Note: Controlled by the Republic of China on Taiwan. See also Political status of Taiwan and One China.)
63	Heidelberg	Germany
64	Boulder	United States
65	Osaka	Japan
66	Tsukuba	Japan
67	Dallas–Fort Worth	United States
68	Austin	United States
69	Ithaca	United States
70	Nanchang	China
71	Brisbane	Australia
72	Milan	Italy
73	Madison	United States
74	Minneapolis–Saint Paul	United States
75	Durham	United States
76	Nagoya metropolitan area	Japan
77	Vancouver	Canada
78	Dresden	Germany
79	Chapel Hill	United States
80	Urbana	United States
81	Rome	Italy
82	Shenyang	China
83	Kunming	China
84	Moscow	Russia
85	Ningbo	China
86	State College	United States
87	Edinburgh	United Kingdom
88	Denver	United States
89	Hamburg	Germany
90	Leuven	Belgium
91	Geneva	Switzerland
92	Kolkata	India
93	Columbus	United States
94	Bengaluru	India
95	Manchester	United Kingdom
96	Central National Capital Region (Delhi)	India
97	Mumbai	India
98	Zhenjiang	China
99	Helsinki	Finland
100	Nashville	United States

== Leading cities in different fields ==
The 10 cities and metropolitan areas with the highest share of articles published in the fields of biological sciences, Earth & environmental sciences, chemistry, health sciences, natural sciences and physical sciences:

Rank	Chemistry	Physical sciences	Earth & environmental sciences	Natural sciences	Biological sciences	Health sciences
1	(China) Beijing	(China) Beijing	(China) Beijing	(China) Beijing	(United States) New York metropolitan area	(United States) Boston metropolitan area
2	(China) Shanghai	(China) Shanghai	(China) Nanjing	(China) Shanghai	(United States) Boston metropolitan area	(United States) New York metropolitan area
3	(China) Nanjing	(China) Nanjing	(China) Guangzhou	(China) Nanjing	(China) Beijing	(United States) Baltimore-Washington
4	(China) Guangzhou	(China) Wuhan	(China) Shanghai	(United States) New York metropolitan area	(United States) San Francisco Bay Area	(United States) San Francisco Bay Area
5	(China) Wuhan	(South Korea) Seoul metropolitan area	(United States) Baltimore-Washington	(China) Guangzhou	(United States) Baltimore-Washington	(United Kingdom) London metropolitan area
6	(China) Hefei	(China) Guangzhou	(China) Wuhan	(United States) Boston metropolitan area	(China) Shanghai	(China) Beijing
7	(China) Hangzhou	(United States) New York metropolitan area	(United States) New York metropolitan area	(China) Wuhan	(United Kingdom) London metropolitan area	(China) Shanghai
8	(China) Tianjin	(China) Hefei	(China) Hangzhou	(United States) San Francisco Bay Area	(France) Paris metropolitan area	(United States) Philadelphia MA
9	(China) Xi’an	(United States) Boston metropolitan area	(United States) Los Angeles metropolitan area	(China) Hangzhou	(China) Guangzhou	(France) Paris metropolitan area
10	(China) Changchun	(United States) San Francisco Bay Area	(United States) San Francisco Bay Area	(China) Hefei	(United States) Los Angeles metropolitan area	(China) Guangzhou

== See also ==
- Innovation Cluster Rating
