= Shaden Kamhawi =

Jordanian scientist

- Born: Jordan
- Education: Salford University
- Employer: National Institute of Allergy and Infectious Diseases
- Known for: co-Editor-in-Chief of PLOS Neglected Tropical Diseases

Shaden Kamhawi a Jordanian scientist and the co-Editor-in-Chief of PLOS Neglected Tropical Diseases academic journal. She is a specialist in vector-borne diseases.

== Personal life ==
Kamhawi was born in Jordan.

== Education and career ==
Kamhawi received her PhD in Medical Entomology the Salford University in Manchester, England, in 1990, before returning to Jordan to work at Yarmouk University, initially as an assistant professor before becoming an associate professor.

She is a specialist in leishmania epidemiology, and in 1997 worked on vector-borne diseases at the National Institute of Allergy and Infectious Diseases (NIAID) during a sabbatical from Yarmouk University. She took a job at NIAID in 2000, working as an Associate Scientist in their Vector Molecular Biology section, based in Rockville, Maryland.

She has been the co-Editor-in-Chief of PLOS Neglected Tropical Diseases academic journal since 2019.

== Selected publications ==
- Coutinho-Abreu IV, de Castro W, Oristian J, Wilson TR, Meneses C, Kamhawi S, Soares RP, Borges VM, Descoteaux A, Valenzuela JG. Binding of Leishmania infantum Lipophosphoglycan to the Midgut Is Not Sufficient To Define Vector Competence in Lutzomyia longipalpis Sand Flies. mSphere. 2020 Sep;5(5):e00594-20.
- DeSouza-Vieira T, Iniguez E, Serafim TD, de Castro W, Karmakar S, Lacsina JR, Meneses C, Disotuar MM, Cecilio P, Nagata BM, Cardoso S, Sonenshine DE, Moore IN, Borges VM, Dey R, Soares MP, Valenzuela JG, Nakhasi HL, Oliveira F, Kamhawi S. Heme Oxygenase-1 Induction by Blood-Feeding Arthropods Controls Skin Inflammation and Promotes Disease Tolerance. Cell Reports. 2020 Oct;33(4):108317
- Oliveira F, Guimarães-Costa AB, Giorgobiani E, Abdeladhim M, Tskhvaradze L, Tsertsvadze N, Zakalashvili M, Oristian J Valenzuela JG, Kamhawi S. Immunity to vector saliva is compromised by short sand fly seasons in endemic regions with temperate climates. Scientific Reports. 2020 May;10(1):7990
- Serafim TD, Meneses C, Coutinho-Abreu IV, Valenzuela JG, Oliveira F, Kamhawi S,. Sequential blood meals promote Leishmania replication and reverse metacyclogenesis augmenting vector infectivity. Nature Microbiology. 2018 May;3(5):548-555
- Hotez PJ, Kamhawi S, Aksoy S, Brindley PJ, What constitutes a neglected tropical disease? PLOS Neglected Tropical Diseases . 2020 Jan;14(1):e0008001.
- Dey R, Oliveira F, Joshi AB, Pereira L, Guimarães-Costa AB, Serafim TD, de Castro W, Coutinho-Abreu IV, Bhattacharya P, Townsend S, Aslan H, Perkins A, Karmakar S, Ismail N, Karetnick M, Nakhasi HL, Meneses C, Duncan R, Valenzuela JG, Kamhawi S. Gut Microbes Egested during Bites of Infected Sand Flies Augment Severity of Leishmaniasis via Inflammasome-Derived IL-1β. Cell Host & Microbe. 2018 Jan;23(1):134-143.e6
