= Allyson Evans =

American biologist

- Education: University of North Carolina at Chapel Hill
- Occupations: biologist, editor

Allyson Evans is an American biologist and the editor in chief of the scientific journal Cell Metabolism.

== Education ==
Evans has a PhD from the University of North Carolina where her studies focussed on cell and developmental biology. She completed her postdoctoral training at the Massachusetts Institute of Technology, focusing on aging, under the supervision of Leonard P. Guarente.

== Career ==
In 2010, Evans joined Cell Press as an editor for Molecular Cell and became the editor in chief of Cell Metabolism in 2019.
