= Daniel Oro =

Spanish ecologist (born 1963)

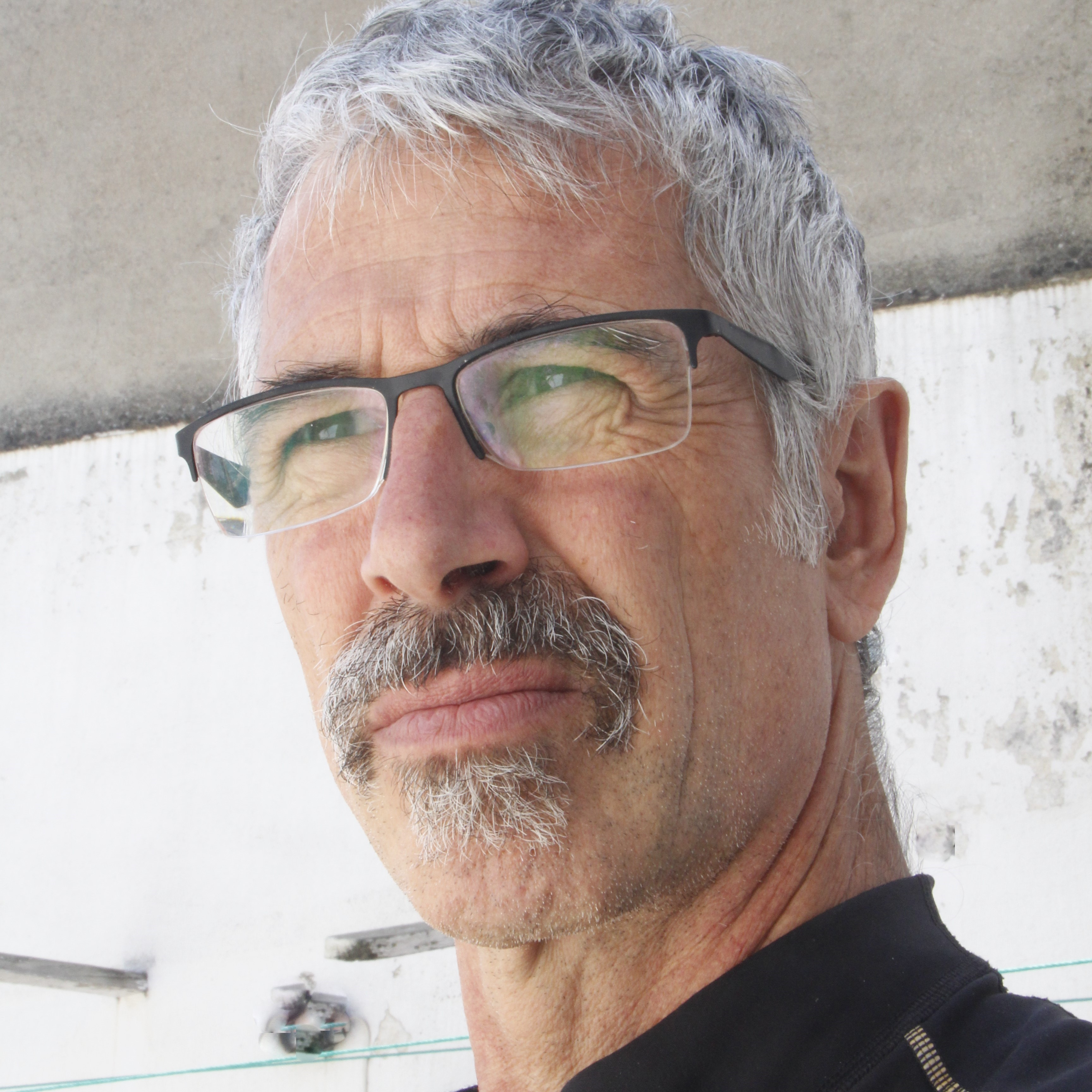
- Born: 12 May 1963 (age 63); Barcelona, Catalonia, Spain
- Awards: Biodiversity and Society - Generalitat Valenciana (2014)
- Scientific career
- Fields: Ecology
- Institutions: CSIC
- Website: www.ceab.csic.es/en/member/oro-daniel

Daniel Oro (born 12 May 1963) is a Spanish ecologist working as Professor of Research at CEAB-CSIC.

== Career ==
Daniel Oro received his biology degree from the University of Barcelona in 1986, and his doctorate in biology from the same University in 1996. After his PhD, he completed post-doc research stays at CEFE-CNRS (Montpellier) and University of Glasgow (UK). During 2000-2016, he served as Professor at IMEDEA CSIC-University of the Balearic Islands. In 2014, Oro received the Biodiversity and Society Award from the Generalitat Valenciana. His research interests are in animal demography and population dynamics, as well as behavioural processes in social species. He has also contributed to the study of transient dynamics in social-ecological systems, exploring how historical and contemporary anthropogenic influences shape ecosystem trajectories over long time scales.

== Selected publications ==
- Oro D, Genovart M, Tavecchia G, Fowler MS, Martínez‐Abraín A. Ecological and evolutionary implications of food subsidies from humans. Ecology Letters. 2013 Dec;16(12):1501-14.
- Bartumeus, F., Giuggioli, L., Louzao, M., Bretagnolle, V., Oro, D. & Levin, S. Fishery discards impact on seabird movement patterns at regional scales. Current Biology. 2010. 20: 1-8.
- Genovart, M., N. Negre, G. Tavecchia, A. Bistuer, L. Parpal & D. Oro. The young, the weak and the sick: evidence of natural selection by predation. PLoS One. 2010 5(3): e9774.
- Oro, D.; Martínez-Abraín, A. Ecological non-equilibrium and biological conservation. Biological Conservation. 2023. 286: e110258.
- Milles, A.; Banitz, T.; Bielcik, M.; Frank, K.; Gallagher, C.A.; Jeltsch, F.; Jepsen, J.U.; Oro, D.; Radchuk, V.; Grimm, V. Local buffer mechanisms for population persistence. Trends in Ecology and Evolution. 2023. 38: 1051-1059.
- Oro, D.; Alsedà, Ll.; Hastings, A.; Genovart, M.; Sardanyés, J. Social copying drives non-linear population collapse. Proceedings of the National Academy of Sciences. 2023. 120: e2214055120.
