= Clinical Microbiology Reviews =

- Discipline: Microbiology, immunology
- Language: English
- Edited by: Graeme Forrest

Publication details
- History: 1988-present
- Publisher: American Society for Microbiology (United States)
- Frequency: Continuous online publication, quarterly print
- Open access: Delayed, after 12 months
- Impact factor: 19.0 (2023)

Standard abbreviations
- ISO 4: Clin. Microbiol. Rev.

Indexing
- CODEN: CMIREX
- ISSN: 0893-8512 (print); 1098-6618 (web)
- LCCN: 88647279
- OCLC no.: 38839512

Links
- Journal homepage; Online access; Online archive; PubMed Central archive

Clinical Microbiology Reviews is a peer-reviewed medical journal covering the areas of clinical microbiology, immunology, medical microbiology, infectious diseases, veterinary microbiology, and microbial pathogenesis. It is a delayed open access journal, full content is accessible via PubMed Central and the journal's website after a 12-month embargo. In April 2015, the journal transitioned to a continuous online publication model (whereby articles are published as they become ready, before the issue in which they will appear has been finalized). The journal became online-only in January 2018. The final print issue was published in October 2017. According to the Journal Citation Reports, the journal has a 2023 impact factor of 19.0. The journal was established in January 1988. The founding editor was Josephine A. Morello (University of Chicago Medical Center). Editorial board structure changed in 1992 and Morello became editor-in-chief. Betty Ann Forbes (State University of New York) was appointed editor-in-chief in 1997. Irving Nachamkin (University of Pennsylvania) was appointed editor-in-chief in 2002 until 2012. Jo-Anne H. Young (University of Minnesota) served as editor-in-chief from 2012 to 2022. The current editor-in-chief is Graeme Forrest (Rush University). It is the ninth journal established and published by the American Society for Microbiology.

== Abstracting and indexing ==
The journal is abstracted and indexed in:

- AGRICOLA
- BIOSIS Previews
- CAB Abstracts
- Cambridge Scientific Abstracts
- Chemical Abstracts
- Current Contents- Life Sciences
- Elsevier BIOBASE
- Embase
- Food Science and Technology Abstracts
- Global Health
- Illustrata
- Index Medicus/PubMed/MEDLINE/PubMed Central
- International Bibliography of Periodical Literature
- Science Citation Index Expanded
- Scopus
- Tropical Diseases Bulletin

According to the Journal Citation Reports, the journal has a 2023 impact factor of 19.0.

== See also ==
- Clinical research
- Gut Microbes
- Nature Microbiology
- Nature Reviews Microbiology
- Cell Host & Microbe
