= Heliyon =

- Discipline: Multidisciplinary
- Language: English

Publication details
- History: 2015–present
- Publisher: Cell Press
- Frequency: Monthly
- Open access: Yes
- License: CC BY
- Impact factor: 3.4 (2023)

Standard abbreviations
- ISO 4: Heliyon

Indexing
- ISSN: 2405-8440
- OCLC no.: 934910176

Links
- Journal homepage; Online archive

Heliyon is a monthly peer-reviewed open-access mega journal covering research in science, medicine and engineering. Unlike most of its competitors, the journal will consider for publication works reporting negative/null results, incremental advances, and replication studies, thus filling the market niche, which became vacant after the discontinuation of the Journal of Negative Results in Biomedicine in 2017.

Heliyon was established in 2015 by Cell Press, a division of Elsevier. According to the publisher's website: "the [journal's] name is all about shining light on important research. Helios was the Greek god of the sun. This root word gave us inspiration, as we want this journal to illuminate knowledge across a broad spectrum."

The journal is divided into numerous sections, each with its own editorial team. Articles are published under a CC BY open access license.

== Abstracting and indexing ==
The journal is abstracted and indexed in:

- CAB Abstracts
- Chemical Abstract Service
- Current Contents/Physical, Chemical & Earth Sciences
- Directory of Open Access Journals
- Food Science and Technology Abstracts
- Science Citation Index Expanded
- Scopus
- The Zoological Record.

=== Retractions ===
On October 2024, the journal's indexation in the Science Citation Index Expanded was put "on hold", with Web of Science citing the concerns on "the quality of the content published in this journal" as a reason for the suspension.

This hold was enacted following the publication of a series of criticism by "Scholarly Criticism" which is a watchdog on Business Research. The first criticism was published on 14 January, 2024. The second criticism was published on 21 April, 2024. These articles raised significant questions on the credibility of quality control applied by the editors of the journal. A recent criticism was published on 26 December, 2025.

In response to Clarivate's hold, the journal announced an internal audit, and records from Retraction Watch show the journal retracted 392 papers in 2025, a sharp uptick from 26 papers in 2024. Following the internal audit, the hold was lifted in 2026, with the journal being to receive an impact factor by 2027.
