= John Pham (scientist) =

American molecular biologist

John W. Pham
- Citizenship: United States
- Education: B.S. - Bates College (music and biochemistry) Ph.D. - Northwestern University (molecular biology)
- Scientific career
- Fields: Molecular biology
- Workplaces: Cell Press
- Thesis: Building the Drosophila RNA-induced silencing complex (2006)
- Doctoral advisor: Erik Sontheimer

John W. Pham is an American molecular biologist and editor-in-chief of Cell, a prestigious scientific journal. He is an advocate for inclusion and diversity, and he represents LGBTQ and Asian communities.

== Biography ==
John Pham was born in the U.S. a few weeks after his parents and older siblings arrived as refugees from Vietnam, and he was raised in Florida.

He earned a bachelor's degree (B.S.) in music and biochemistry from Bates College. He completed a Ph.D. at Northwestern University under advisor Erik Sontheimer. His research focused on understanding the mechanisms of RNA splicing and RNA interference. He presented his dissertation in 2006 which was entitled Building the Drosophila RNA-induced silencing complex.

After his PhD, he completed a postdoctoral fellowship at Harvard Medical School and Brigham and Women's Hospital.

=== Career at Cell Press ===
He joined Cell Press in 2008 as a member of the editorial team of the journal Molecular Cell, of which he would become the editor-in-chief later in 2012. In 2018, Pham was appointed editor-in-chief of Cell, succeeding Emilie Marcus who had departed in February 2018.

== Involvement with inclusion and diversity ==
John Pham is a member of the LGBT community. In June 2019, he was a speaker at an event organized by Elsevier Pride and 500 Queer Scientists at the WorldPride NYC 2019.

He has played a major role in making the journal Cell more inclusive. Since he started with Cell, he has helped shift the advisory board from roughly 20% women to 50% women. Additionally, the Cell reviewers have changed from 18% to 33% women during the time John Pham has been editor-in-chief of the journal. He believes that a more diverse science is better science, and including more women will lead to better ideas and talent.

=== Personal life ===
As of July 2018, Pham resides in Dorchester, Boston with his partner and their two dogs. Among his hobbies, he likes running, enjoying good beer, tending to his plants, cooking, and hanging out with his partner and pets.
