= Raghu G. Mirmira =

American physician-scientist

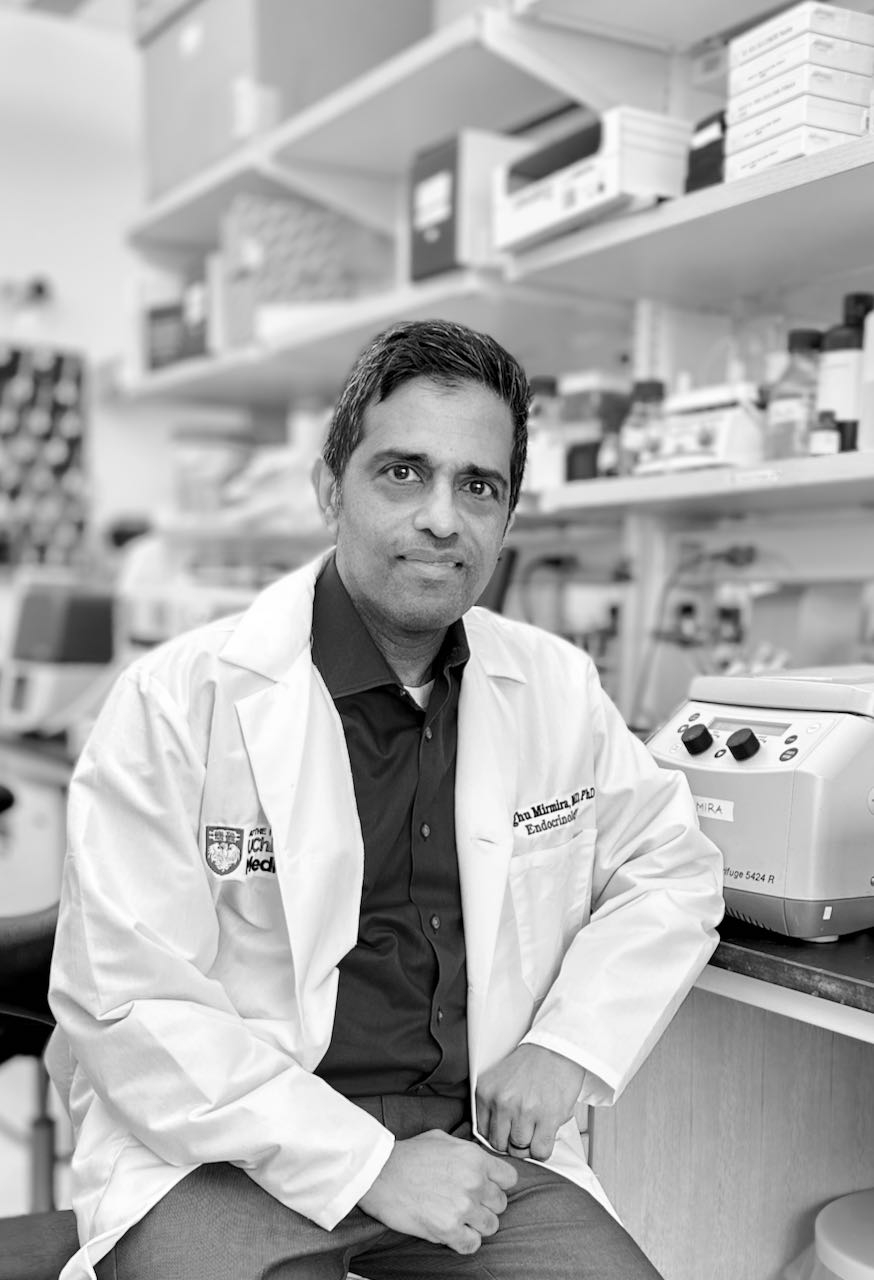
- Mirmira Portrait
- Born: Illinois, United States
- Known for: Pancreatic β-cell biology and mechanisms of dysfunction in diabetes; β-cell stress responses in Type 1 diabetes; biomarkers of β-cell injury
- Awards: Albert Renold Award, American Diabetes Association (2023); Elected member, Association of American Physicians (2025); Elected member, American Society for Clinical Investigation
- Scientific career
- Fields: Endocrinology, Diabetes research, Beta cell biology, Translational medicine
- Workplaces: University of Chicago (Professor of Medicine; Director, Diabetes Research and Training Center; Vice Chair for Research, Department of Medicine; Director, Medical Scientist Training Program); Indiana University School of Medicine (former; Eli Lilly & Co. Professor; Director, Center for Diabetes and Metabolic Diseases; Director, Medical Scientist Training Program); University of Virginia (former)

Raghu G. Mirmira (also known as Raghavendra G. Mirmira) is an American physician-scientist specializing in diabetes, pancreatic β-cell biology, and translational endocrinology.

He is a tenured Professor of Medicine at the University of Chicago, where he serves as Director of the NIH-funded Diabetes Research and Training Center, Vice Chair for Research in the Department of Medicine, and Director of the Medical Scientist Training Program (appointed effective April 2026).

His laboratory has examined the role of β-cell stress responses in the pathogenesis of Type 1 diabetes and has contributed to the development of biomarkers of β-cell injury as well as strategies aimed at informing new therapeutic approaches. In 2023, he received the Albert Renold Award from the American Diabetes Association for his outstanding contributions to the training and mentorship of diabetes research scientists.

== Early life and education ==
Mirmira is a native of Illinois. He completed his MD and PhD training at the University of Chicago, followed by residency in internal medicine and fellowship in diabetes and endocrinology at the University of California, San Francisco, where he was a Howard Hughes Medical Institute Physician Postdoctoral Fellow.

== Career ==
Mirmira began his independent research career at the University of Virginia. He later joined the Indiana University School of Medicine as the Eli Lilly & Co. Professor, where he founded and directed the Indiana Center for Diabetes and Metabolic Diseases (subsequently funded by the NIH as a Diabetes Research Center) and served as Director of the Medical Scientist Training Program.

In 2019 he returned to the University of Chicago as Professor of Medicine. He has since served as Vice Chair for Research in the Department of Medicine and Director of the Diabetes Research and Training Center; in 2026 he was additionally appointed Director of the Medical Scientist Training Program. He continues to practice clinical endocrinology while leading an internationally recognized, NIH-funded research program in islet biology.

== Research ==
Mirmira’s laboratory investigates the molecular mechanisms that cause pancreatic β-cell dysfunction and loss in diabetes. His group has studied transcriptional and epigenetic regulation of β-cell identity, inflammatory pathways (including 12-lipoxygenase signaling), and stress-response mechanisms that affect β-cell survival.

His work has explored how intrinsic β-cell stress responses may influence immune recognition in autoimmune diabetes. The laboratory has also contributed to the development of biomarkers, such as differentially methylated insulin DNA, to detect β-cell stress and injury, and has explored therapeutic strategies aimed at protecting β-cell function.

His research spans molecular and cellular biology, human islet studies, animal models, and translational investigations. He has maintained continuous NIH funding for more than two decades as principal investigator or multiple principal investigator on numerous R01, U01, and P30 grants.

== Awards and honors ==
- Albert Renold Award, American Diabetes Association (2023) - for outstanding contributions to the training of diabetes research scientists.
- Elected to the Association of American Physicians (2025).
- Elected to the American Society for Clinical Investigation.

He has also received multiple mentoring and scientific achievement awards and has been recognized as a Castle Connolly Top Doctor in endocrinology.

== Selected publications ==
Mirmira has authored or co-authored numerous peer-reviewed articles. Representative recent publications include:

- “Inhibition of polyamine biosynthesis preserves β cell function in type 1 diabetes” (Cell Reports Medicine, 2023).
- “Proinflammatory signaling in islet β cells propagates invasion of pathogenic immune cells in autoimmune diabetes” (Cell Reports, 2022).
- “Deoxyhypusine synthase promotes a pro-inflammatory macrophage phenotype” (Cell Metabolism, 2021).
