= Cell Chemical Biology =

- Discipline: Chemical biology
- Language: English

Publication details
- Former names: Chemistry & Biology
- History: Since 2016
- Publisher: Cell Press
- Frequency: Monthly
- Open access: Delayed, after 12 months
- Impact factor: 7.2 (2024)

Standard abbreviations
- ISO 4: Cell Chem. Biol.

Indexing
- ISSN: 2451-9456 (print); 2451-9448 (web)

Links
- Journal homepage

Cell Chemical Biology is a monthly peer-reviewed scientific journal published by Cell Press. The journal publishes research in chemical biology and studies at the interface of chemistry and biology.

== Abstracting and indexing ==
The journal is abstracted and indexed in:

- Embase
- MEDLINE
- PubMed
- Science Citation Index Expanded
- Scopus

According to the Journal Citation Reports, the journal has a 2024 impact factor of 7.2.
