= Syma Khalid =

British Microbiologist

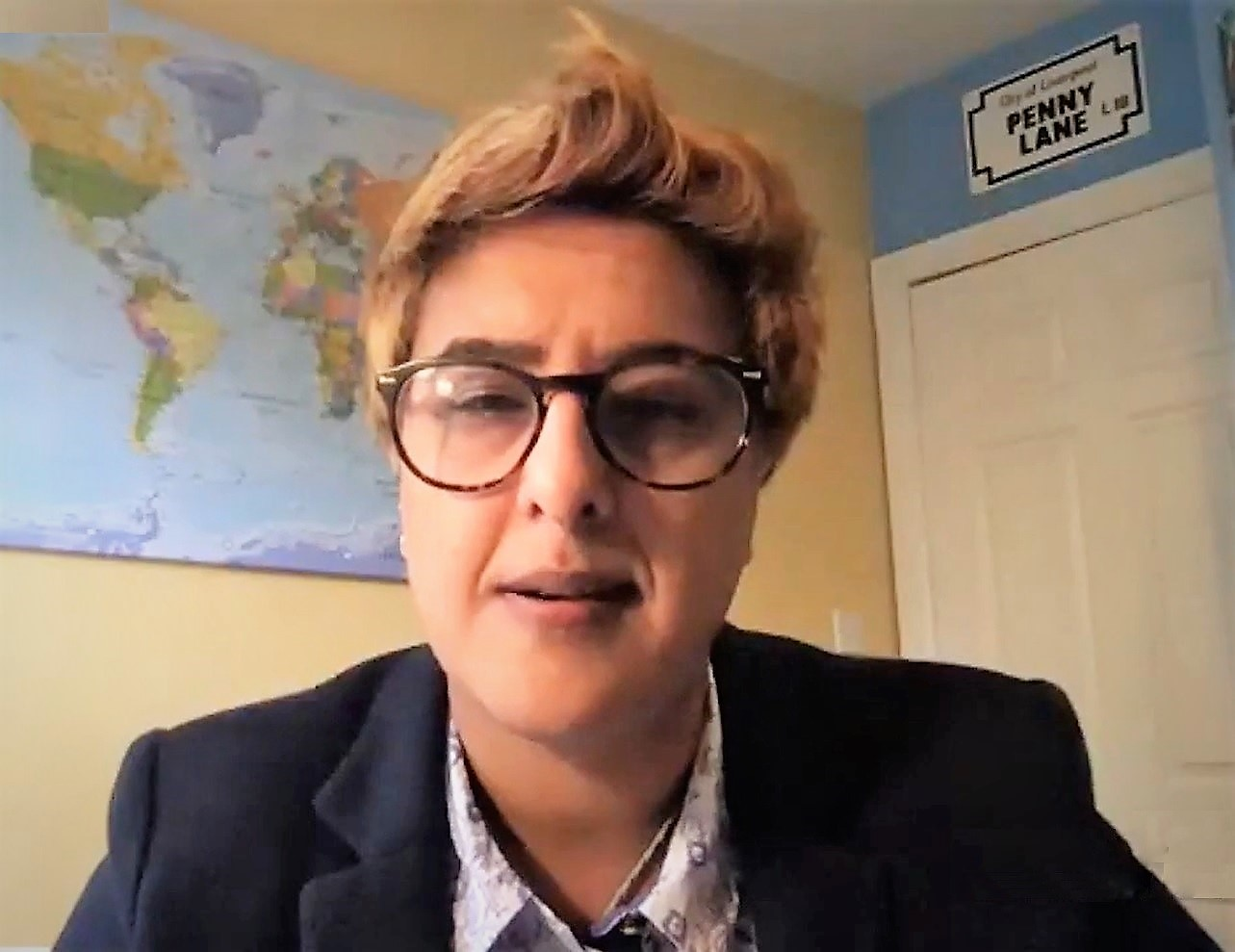
- Khalid in 2020
- Born: 25 December 1977 (age 48); Wolverhampton, England
- Education: University of Warwick
- Awards: Suffrage Science award (2021)
- Scientific career
- Workplaces: University of Southampton; University of Oxford
- Thesis: Molecular simulation studies of the interaction between DNA and a novel macromolecular ligand (2004)

Syma Khalid (born 25 December 1977) is a British Scientist who is a Professor of Computational Microbiology in at the University of Oxford. She was awarded the Suffrage Science award for engineering and physical sciences in 2021.

== Early life and education ==
Khalid grew up in Wolverhampton, England. Her parents are from Pakistan and were first-generation immigrants to the United Kingdom. Her father worked as a bus driver and her mother as a seamstress. She eventually studied chemistry at the University of Warwick and graduated in 2000. She stayed at Warwick for her graduate studies, joining the research group of Mark Rodger. Her doctoral research considered molecular simulations DNA. interacting with synthetic helicates. Khalid was a postdoctoral researcher at the University of Oxford, where she worked in the group of Mark Sansom on structure-property relationships of bacterial membrane proteins.

== Research and career ==
Syma graduated with a first class degree in chemistry from the University of Warwick in 2000. She remained at Warwick to read for a PhD under the supervision of Prof. P. Mark Rodger. After obtaining her PhD in 2003, she moved to the University of Oxford as a postdoc in Prof Mark Sansom’s lab, to study the structure-function relationship of bacterial outer membrane proteins. During her postdoctoral work, she became interested in the application of molecular simulation techniques to problems in bionanotechnology. From 2006, she was funded by the Oxford Bionanotechnology IRC to pursue a number of projects in collaboration with experimental groups. In 2007, she was appointed as RCUK fellow in chemical biology at in the school of chemistry at the University of Southampton. In 2010, she was appointed to a full lectureship at Southampton. In 2012 She was promoted to senior lecturer. In 2016 she was promoted to full professor. In 2021 she was appointed as professor of computational microbiology at the department of biochemistry, University of Oxford. The main theme in her research is the use of computational techniques to explore the structure-function relationships of a range of microbial membranes/cell envelopes, with a particular focus on Gram-negative bacteria. She is particularly interested in developing computational models that closely mimic in vivo systems, in an approach that differs from traditional reductionist approaches often employed within biomolecular simulations.

Syma is cohost of Science of the Times podcast with fellow University of Oxford academic Timothy Coulson.

Syma is the current chair of HECBioSim. She chairs the Technical Advisory Panel of the Artificial Intelligence and Informatics theme of the Rosalind Franklin Institute.

In 2021 she was awarded the Suffrage Science award.

== Selected publications ==
- Peter J Bond; John Holyoake; Anthony Ivetac; Syma Khalid; Mark S.P. Sansom (20 October 2006). "Coarse-grained molecular dynamics simulations of membrane proteins and peptides". Journal of Structural Biology. 157 (3): 593–605. doi:10.1016/j.jsb.2006.10.004. ISSN 1047-8477. PMID 17116404. Wikidata Q79372145.
- Thomas J Piggot; Ángel Piñeiro; Syma Khalid (25 September 2012). "Molecular Dynamics Simulations of Phosphatidylcholine Membranes: A Comparative Force Field Study". Journal of Chemical Theory and Computation. 8 (11): 4593–4609. doi:10.1021/ct3003157. ISSN 1549-9618. PMID 26605617. Wikidata Q39522644. (erratum)
- Kathryn A Scott; Peter J Bond; Anthony Ivetac; Alan P Chetwynd; Syma Khalid; Mark S.P. Sansom (1 April 2008). "Coarse-grained MD simulations of membrane protein-bilayer self-assembly". Structure. 16 (4): 621–630. doi:10.1016/j.str.2008.01.014. ISSN 0969-2126. PMID 18400182. Wikidata Q30368740.
