= Revue Médicale de Bruxelles =

- Discipline: Medicine
- Language: French
- Edited by: Stéphane Louryan

Publication details
- Former name(s): Bruxelles Médical
- History: 1896–present
- Publisher: Association des Médecins issus de l'Université libre de Bruxelles (Belgium)
- Frequency: Bimonthly
- Open access: Delayed, after 12 months

Standard abbreviations
- ISO 4: Rev. Méd. Brux.

Indexing
- CODEN: RMBRDQ
- ISSN: 0035-3639
- OCLC no.: 73692201

Links
- Journal homepage; Online access; Online archive

The Revue Médicale de Bruxelles (English: Medical Journal of Brussels) is a bimonthly peer-reviewed medical journal published by the Association des Médecins issus de l'Université libre de Bruxelles. It covers all aspects of medicine, especially as relevant "for the continuing-education training of specialists and general practitioners". The editor-in-chief is Stéphane Louryan (Université libre de Bruxelles). The journal is published in French with bilingual abstracts (French and English). It was established in 1896 as Journal Médical de Bruxelles until 1914 ceasing publication during World War I. The journal resumed in 1921 until a new title, Bruxelles Médical. It obtained its current title in 1944, with volume numbering restarting at 1 in 1980.

== Abstracting and indexing ==
The journal is abstracted and indexed in Index Medicus/MEDLINE/PubMed.
