= Paul Brindley =

Paul Brindley may refer to:

- Paul Brindley (musician), bassist of The Sundays
- Paul Brindley (biologist) (born 1954), Australian parasitologist, microbiologist, and helminthologist
