= Nature Reviews Microbiology =

- Discipline: Microbiology
- Language: English
- Edited by: Ashley York

Publication details
- History: 2003–present
- Publisher: Nature Portfolio
- Frequency: Monthly
- Impact factor: 104.6 (2025)

Standard abbreviations
- ISO 4: Nat. Rev. Microbiol.

Indexing
- CODEN: NRMACK
- ISSN: 1740-1526 (print); 1740-1534 (web)
- LCCN: 2009252829
- OCLC no.: 780556277

Links
- Journal homepage; Online archive

Nature Reviews Microbiology is a monthly peer-reviewed review journal published by Nature Portfolio. It was established in 2003. The journal publishes reviews and perspectives on microbiology, bridging fundamental research and its clinical, industrial, and environmental applications. The editor-in-chief is Ashley York.

== Abstracting and indexing ==
This journal is indexed and abstracted by the following databases:

- BIOSIS Previews
- Current Contents/Life Sciences
- Science Citation Index
- Medline
- PubMed
- Index Medicus

Other services that index this journal are:

- Scopus, Academic Search Premier, Biotechnology Research Abstracts, CAB Abstracts, Chemical Abstracts Service, and EMBASE.

According to the Journal Citation Reports, the journal has a 2024 impact factor of 103.3, ranking it 1st in the "Microbiology" category.

== See also ==
- Nature Microbiology
- Gut Microbes
- Cell Host & Microbe
- Clinical Microbiology Reviews
