= Chem (journal) =

- Discipline: Chemistry
- Language: English
- Edited by: Robert Eagling

Publication details
- History: 2016–present
- Publisher: Cell Press
- Frequency: Monthly
- Open access: Delayed (12 months)
- Impact factor: 19.1 (2025)

Standard abbreviations
- ISO 4: Chem

Indexing
- CODEN: CHEMVE
- ISSN: 2451-9308 (print); 2451-9294 (web)
- LCCN: 2017205712
- OCLC no.: 981556557

Links
- Journal homepage

Chem is a peer-reviewed scientific journal by Cell Press. It is a sister journal to Cell. It was established in 2016, and is currently edited by Robert Eagling.

== Abstracting and indexing ==
Chem is abstracted and indexed the following bibliographic databases:

- INSPEC
- Science Citation Index Expanded
- Scopus

According to the Journal Citation Reports, the journal has a 2025 impact factor of 19.1.
