= Cell Systems =

- Discipline: Systems biology
- Language: English
- Edited by: Quincey Justman

Publication details
- History: 2015–present
- Publisher: Cell Press
- Frequency: Monthly
- Open access: Delayed, 1 year
- Impact factor: 7.5 (2025)

Standard abbreviations
- ISO 4: Cell Syst.

Indexing
- CODEN: CSEYA4
- ISSN: 2405-4712 (print); 2405-4720 (web)
- OCLC no.: 5842601758

Links
- Journal homepage; Online access; Online archive

Cell Systems is a monthly peer-reviewed scientific journal covering research in systems biology. The journal was established in 2015 and published by Cell Press. According to the Journal Citation Reports, the journal has a 2025 impact factor of 7.5.
