= Ines Azevedo =

Portuguese engineer and scientist

Inês M.L. Azevedo
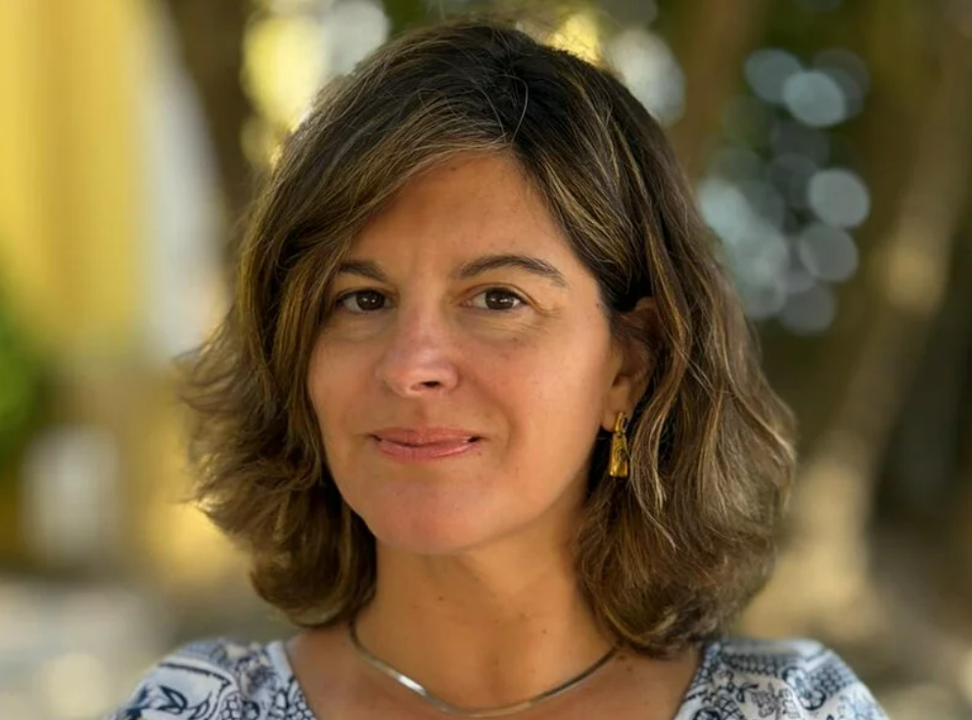
- Professor at Stanford University
- Born: Portugal

Academic background
- Education: IST Technical University of Lisbon; Carnegie Mellon University

Academic work
- Discipline: Energy Systems Engineer
- Institutions: Stanford University Carnegie Mellon University

Inês Margarida Lima de Azevedo is a Portuguese engineer and scientist who is a professor at Stanford University and the Director of the Stanford Woods Institute for the Environment. She is affiliated with the Energy Science & Engineering Department at the Stanford Doerr School of Sustainability. Her research focuses on energy systems modeling, decarbonization, and electricity system transitions.

Azevedo has contributed to national and international climate and energy assessments. From 2018 to 2022, she served as a lead author for the Energy Systems chapter in the Intergovernmental Panel on Climate Change Sixth Assessment Report (AR6, Working Group III). In 2023, she served as a contributing author for the Mitigation chapter of the Fifth U.S. National Climate Assessment.

She has also served as an author and committee member for multiple studies conducted by the National Academies of Sciences, Engineering, and Medicine, including reports on reducing fuel consumption and greenhouse gas emissions from medium- and heavy-duty vehicles and on the assessment of solid-state lighting technologies.

== Education and career ==
Professor Azevedo received a B.Sc. in Environmental Engineering from the IST Technical University of Lisbon in 2004. She later earned an M.Sc. in Innovation and Management of Technology from the same institution in 2009, and a Ph.D. in Engineering and Public Policy from Carnegie Mellon University in 2009.

Following her doctoral studies, she joined Carnegie Mellon University’s Department of Engineering and Public Policy, where she held several positions, including Research Engineer (2009–2010), Assistant Research Professor (2010–2013), Assistant Professor (2013–2014), Associate Professor (2014–2017), and Full Professor (2017–2019) .

In 2019, Azevedo joined Stanford University as an associate professor in the Department of Energy Science and Engineering and was promoted to Professor in 2024. At Stanford, she holds courtesy appointments in the Departments of Civil and Environmental Engineering and Earth System Science, and is a Senior Fellow at the Woods Institute for the Environment and the Precourt Institute for Energy

== Research ==
Azevedo's research focuses on the environmental, economic, and technological dimensions of energy systems, with an emphasis on informing decision-making in the transition to low-carbon energy systems. Her work addresses interdisciplinary challenges at the intersection of engineering, economics, and public policy, examining how energy systems evolve over time and how emerging technologies and decision-making processes shape that evolution.

Her research spans areas including the decarbonization of electricity and transportation systems, air pollution and public health impacts, energy demand and efficiency, and life-cycle assessment of energy technologies. Her work integrates data-driven analysis and modeling to evaluate trade-offs between reliability, affordability, and sustainability, and has appeared in more than 140 papers published in high-impact journals such as Science, Nature Energy, Joule, Nature Communications, Nature Climate Change, Nature Sustainability, and the Proceedings of the National Academy of Sciences of the United States, among others. Her work has contributed to studies on energy systems and climate mitigation being cited more than 10,000 times

Azevedo's research on energy systems, decarbonization, and industrial emissions has been discussed in independent media and policy outlets. Coverage in publications such as MIT Technology Review, Scientific American, Yahoo News, and Inside Climate News, among others, has highlighted challenges associated with reducing emissions from sectors such as heavy industry, transportation, and global energy systems.

== Awards ==
Azevedo has received several awards recognizing her contributions to energy and environmental research, including being honored by Stanford's Faculty Women's Forum as a recipient of the 2026 Outstanding Leader Award. In the past, she has also been honored with the Terman Fellow Award and the Gabilan Faculty Fellow Award at Stanford University in 2021 and the C3E Women in Clean Energy Research Award in 2017.

Earlier in her career, she received the Philip L. Dowd Fellowship at Carnegie Mellon University and was selected as a Young Scientist Under 40 by the World Economic Forum in 2014. She also received Carnegie Mellon University's College of Engineering Dean's Early Career Fellowship in 2013.
