= International Society for Stem Cell Research =

- Founded: 2002
- Tax ID no.: 36-4491158
- Legal status: 501(c)(3) nonprofit organization
- Headquarters: Evanston, Illinois, United States
- Members: 4,900
- President: Hideyuki Okano
- Chief Executive Officer: Keith Alm
- Employees: 18 (2022)
- Website: www.isscr.org

The International Society for Stem Cell Research (ISSCR) is an independent 501(c)(3) nonprofit organization based in Evanston, Illinois, United States. The organization's mission is to promote excellence in stem cell science and applications to human health.

== History ==
The International Society for Stem Cell Research was formed in 2002 (incorporated on March 30, 2001) to foster the exchange of information on stem cell research. Leonard Zon, professor of pediatrics at Harvard Medical School, served as the organization's first president.

In June 2003, the International Society for Stem Cell Research held its first convention. More than 600 scientists attended, many of whom expressed frustration over restrictions that President George W. Bush's administration had placed on the field of stem-cell research, slowing the pace of research. Scientists who were leaders in their fields were prohibited from using funding from the National Institutes of Health to conduct certain experiments that could provide significant medical achievements.

As a service to the field, in 2006, the ISSCR developed guidelines that address the international diversity of cultural, political, legal, and ethical perspectives related to stem cell research and its translation to medicine. The guidelines were designed to underscore widely shared principles in science that call for rigor, oversight, and transparency in all areas of practice. Adherence to the ISSCR guidelines would provide assurance that stem cell research is conducted with scientific and ethical integrity and that new therapies are evidence-based. In response to advances in science, the guidelines were updated in 2008, and again in 2016, to encompass a broader and more expansive scope of research and clinical endeavor than before, imposing rigor on all stages of research, addressing the cost of regenerative medicine products, and highlighting the need for accurate and effective public communication. The 2016 Guidelines for Stem Cell Research and Clinical Translation have been adopted by researchers, clinicians, organizations, and institutions around the world.

In 2013, the Society's official journal, Stem Cell Reports, was established; it is published monthly by Cell Press on the Society's behalf.

In March 2015, scientists, including an inventor of CRISPR, urged a worldwide hold on germline gene therapy, writing that "scientists should avoid even attempting, in lax jurisdictions, germline genome modification for clinical application in humans" until the full implications "are discussed among scientific and governmental organizations".

After the publication that a Chinese group had used CRISPR to modify a gene in human embryos, the group repeated their call for a suspension of "attempts at human clinical germ-line genome editing while extensive scientific analysis of the potential risks is conducted, along with broad public discussion of the societal and ethical implications."

The ISSCR’s Annual Meetings are the largest stem cell research conferences in the world, drawing nearly 3,900 attendees in 2020 for the organization's first global, virtual event, ISSCR 2020 Digital. The ISSCR’s membership includes international leaders of stem cell research and regenerative medicine representing more than 70 countries worldwide. In 2021, the ISSCR published an update to its internationally recognized Guidelines for Stem Cell Research and Clinical Translation, that address the international diversity of cultural, political, legal, and ethical issues associated with stem cell research and its translation to medicine.. In 2022, the Society hosted its first hybrid annual meeting in San Francisco, USA and launched ISSCR.digital, which offers scientific education and opportunities to network and build new connections with the global community.
