= PHEC-66 =

PHEC-66 is an extract of cannabis which, in at least one study published in the peer reviewed journal Cells, has been found to be an effective treatment for melanoma, by triggering cell apoptosis. The extract is 60% cannabidiol (CBD).
