= Trevor K. Archer =

American public health researcher

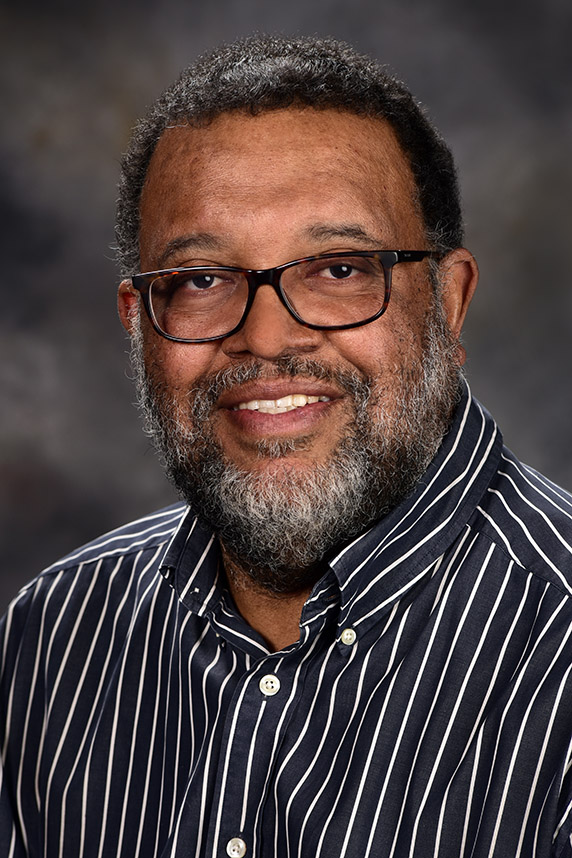
- Archer 2019 NIEHS photograph
- Born: The Bahamas
- Education: Queen's University at Kingston
- Scientific career
- Workplaces: National Cancer Institute; University of Western Ontario
- Thesis: An analysis of human and non-human primate apolipoprotein biosynthesis : hormonal (1988)

Trevor K. Archer is a Bahamian research scientist who is a National Institutes of Health Distinguished Investigator and deputy director at the National Institute of Environmental Health Sciences. He leads the Chromatin and Gene Expression Group, who investigate chromatin, epigenetics and embryonic stem cells pluripotency.

== Early life and education ==
Archer was born in The Bahamas. He studied biochemistry at Queen's University at Kingston, and remained there for his doctorate. His doctoral research considered human and non-human primate apolipoprotein biosynthesis. He moved to the National Cancer Institute as a postdoctoral researcher working on chromatin and epigenetics, with a focus on steroid hormone activated transcription.

== Research and career ==
Archer returned to Canada in 1992, where he was made an Assistant Professor and National Cancer Institute Canada scientist at University of Western Ontario. He received tenure in 1996. In 1999, he was recruited to the National Institute of Environmental Health Sciences. He was promoted to Chief of Molecular Carcinogenesis in 2003, and Chief of Epigenetics and Stem Cell Biology in 2014. He was named as an National Institutes of Health Distinguished Investigator in 2019.

Archer's research uses genomics to study the environmental factors that impact the architecture of chromatin, and how changes to the architecture of chromatin impact gene expression, which affects health and disease. Archer showed that steroid hormone signalling can be used to understand how gene expression is controlled. More recently, Archer was involved in research finding that histone modifications occur independently of DNA transcription, and that transcription can undo histone modifications.

In an interview with Molecular Cell, Archer said that throughout his career he was underestimated because of his skin color. As a Deputy Director of the National Institute of Environmental Health Sciences, Archer chaired a committee on workplace culture, where he looked to diversify the talent pool, and make the NIEHS more inclusive.

== Selected publications ==
- Deborah A Greer Card; Pratibha B Hebbar; Leping Li; Kevin W Trotter; Yoshihiro Komatsu; Yuji Mishina; Archer, Trevor (2008). "Oct4/Sox2-regulated miR-302 targets cyclin D1 in human embryonic stem cells". Molecular and Cellular Biology. 28 (20): 6426–38. doi:10.1128/mcb.00359-08. PMC 2577422. PMID 18710938. Wikidata Q24323720.
- Fryer CJ; Archer, Trevor (1998). "Chromatin remodelling by the glucocorticoid receptor requires the BRG1 complex". Nature. 393 (6680): 88–91. Bibcode:1998Natur.393...88F. doi:10.1038/30032. PMID 9590696. Wikidata Q28271105.
- Archer, Trevor; Lefebvre, Philippe; R. G. Wolford; Hager, Gordon L. (1992). "Transcription factor loading on the MMTV promoter: a bimodal mechanism for promoter activation". Science. 255 (5051): 1573–1576. Bibcode:1992Sci...255.1573A. doi:10.1126/science.1347958. PMID 1347958. Wikidata Q67514906.
