= Yong-Ling Ruan =

Chinese-Australian plant molecular cell biologist

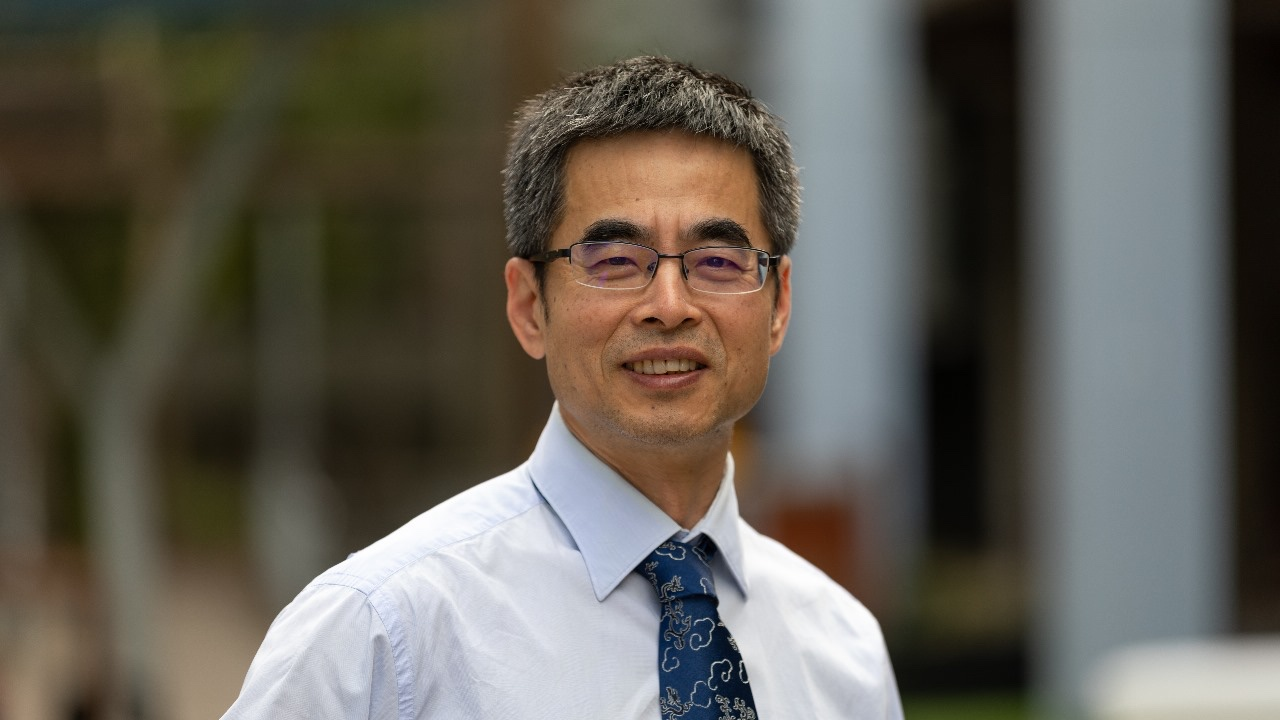
- Born: November 1962 (age 63); Haining, Zhejiang, China
- Education: Zhejiang University (BSc, MSc); University of Newcastle (PhD)
- Known for: Research on plant carbon metabolism, nutrient allocation, and sugar signaling
- Scientific career
- Fields: Plant molecular cell biology
- Workplaces: College of Horticulture, Northwest A & F University; Research School of Biology, Australian National University

Yong-Ling Ruan (born November 1962) is a Chinese Australian plant molecular cell biologist known for his research on plant carbon metabolism, nutrient allocation, and sugar signaling. He is a C.J. Laureate Professor at the College of Horticulture, Northwest A & F University in China and an Honorary Professor at the Research School of Biology, Australian National University. Ruan's research aims to improve plant yield, resilience, and biodiversity through the study of carbon and energy allocation between plant organs and cells.

== Early life and education ==
Ruan was born in Haining, Zhejiang, China. He completed his undergraduate degree in Agricultural science at Zhejiang University in 1983, followed by a Master of Science in Horticulture from the same institution in 1986. Ruan then moved to Australia to pursue a Doctor of Philosophy at the University of Newcastle, where he earned his Doctor of Philosophy in Plant physiology and Cell biology in 1995.

== Career and research ==
Ruan's primary research interests include elucidating the roles of sugar metabolism, transport, and signaling in plant development and stress responses. He has worked extensively on discovering molecular networks that regulate resource partitioning in plants during evolution and domestication. His research has also focused on identifying genes that control nutrient distribution and plant productivity. His work has had significant implications for improving crop yield, resilience to environmental stresses, and overall plant health.

He has led research teams at the University of Newcastle, CSIRO Plant Industry, and the Chinese Academy of Sciences. His contributions to plant biology include the development of the "Ready-Set-Grow" model, which addresses the molecular mechanisms behind seed and fruit set or their abortion. He has also discovered the roles of enzymes like invertase and sucrose synthase, sugar transporters, and plasmodesmata in plant growth and yield. Additionally, his research has provided insights into the evolutionary and functional roles of sugar signaling across cellular and subcellular compartments.

Ruan has published over 140 peer-reviewed papers in areas of carbon metabolism and sugar transport and signaling, in journals such as Nature Genetics, Nature Plants, The Plant Cell, Molecular Plant, Plant Physiology, Proceedings of the National Academy of Sciences, and Annual Review of Plant Biology.

== Academic positions ==
Ruan is currently the CJ Laureate Professor at the College of Horticulture, Northwest A & F University, China, a position he has held since 2023. He is also an Honorary Professor at the Research School of Biology, Australian National University, a role he has occupied since 2022. From 2008 to 2021, he worked at the University of Newcastle, Australia, where he served as a Professor from 2016 to 2021 and as an associate professor from 2008 to 2015.

Prior to his academic roles at the University of Newcastle, he worked at CSIRO Plant Industry in Canberra, Australia, as a Senior Research Scientist from 2005 to 2007 and as a Research Scientist from 2001 to 2005. Additionally, he held a Professor position at the Shanghai Institute of Plant Physiology and Ecology, Chinese Academy of Sciences, from 2004 to 2010. His early academic career also included research roles as a Research Fellow at CSIRO Plant Industry and as a Postdoctoral Fellow at the University of Florida/USDA in the United States from 1995 to 1997. He began his academic career as a lecturer in horticulture at Zhejiang University in China, where he worked from 1986 to 1991.

== Honors and awards ==
Ruan was named a Global Highly Cited Researcher from 2013 to 2023 in the field of Plant and Animal Sciences by Clarivate, Web of Science. In 2023, he received the CJ Laureate Professorship from the Ministry of Education, China. He was also recognized as a Fellow of the College of Experts by the Australian Research Council from 2019 to 2021. From 2008 to 2021, he served as the Director of the Australia-China Research Centre for Crop Improvement. Between 2018 and 2021, he held the Kuang-Piu Chair Professorship at Zhejiang University, China. Other honors include the Peter Goldacre Medal in 2005 from the Australian Society of Plant Scientists and the Distinguished Young Scientist Award in 2004 from the National Natural Science Foundation of China (NSFC).

== Editorial roles ==
Ruan has served in various editorial positions for leading scientific journals. He has been a Guest Editor for The Plant Cell since 2023 and a Senior Editor for both the Journal of Plant Physiology since 2019 and New Crops since 2023. He was an Editorial Board Member for Molecular Plant from 2011 to 2023 and an Associate Editor for Frontiers in Plant Science from 2010 to 2023.
