= Susan Christina Welburn =

British epidemiologist

Susan Christina Welburn OBE
- Education: University of the West of England; University of Bristol
- Scientific career
- Workplaces: University of Glasgow; University of Edinburgh
- Thesis: The rickettsia-like organisms of Glossina spp (1991)

Susan Welburn is a British epidemiologist who is a professor and Chair of Medical and Veterinary Molecular Epidemiology at the University of Edinburgh. Her research considers the parasitic interactions that underpin sleeping sickness. She was appointed an Officer of the Order of the British Empire in the 2025 New Year Honours.

== Early life and education ==
Welburn was an undergraduate student at the University of the West of England. She earned a doctorate at the University of Bristol, where she researched the rickettsia-like organisms of Glossina. She started her career at the Bristol Tsetse Research Laboratories, before moving to the University of Glasgow. She has projects in Uganda, Kenya, Nigeria, Zambia and Tanzania, focussing on interventions for disease control.

== Research and career ==
In 2000, Welburn joined the University of Edinburgh. Her research looks at the parasitic interactions that lead to the transmission of human sleeping sickness. She has investigated the complex mechanisms that underpin parasite differentiation, the transmission of disease and the epidemiology of sleeping sickness.

Welburn has designed molecular diagnostic techniques to study sleeping sickness and other neglected zoonotic diseases, including anthrax, rabies, and tuberculosis. In 2006 she established the Ugandan Public Private Partnership to Stamp Out Sleeping Sickness. She developed a One Health approach for medical and veterinary public health interventions. Welburn is the founding Director of the University of Edinburgh Global Health Academy.

In 2015, Welburn was appointed Fellow of the Royal Society of Edinburgh. She was appointed an Officer of the Order of the British Empire in the 2025 New Year Honours.

== Selected publications ==
- Eric M Fèvre; Beatrix V Wissmann; Susan C Welburn; Pascal Lutumba (23 December 2008). "The burden of human African trypanosomiasis". PLoS Neglected Tropical Diseases. 2 (12): e333. doi:10.1371/journal.pntd.0000333. ISSN 1935-2735. PMC 2602597. PMID 19104653. Wikidata Q33395338.
- C Dale; S A Young; D T Haydon; S C Welburn (30 January 2001). "The insect endosymbiont Sodalis glossinidius utilizes a type III secretion system for cell invasion". Proceedings of the National Academy of Sciences of the United States of America. 98 (4): 1883–1888. doi:10.1073/pnas.021450998. ISSN 0027-8424. PMC 29351. PMID 11172045. Wikidata Q34109059.
- Susan Welburn; K Picozzi; Eric M Fèvre; P G Coleman; M Odiit; M Carrington; I Maudlin (1 December 2001). "Identification of human-infective trypanosomes in animal reservoir of sleeping sickness in Uganda by means of serum-resistance-associated (SRA) gene". The Lancet. 358 (9298): 2017–2019. doi:10.1016/s0140-6736(01)07096-9. ISSN 0140-6736. PMID 11755607. Wikidata Q38884765.
