= Stem Cell Reports =

- Discipline: Regenerative medicine
- Language: English
- Edited by: Martin Pera

Publication details
- History: 2013-present
- Publisher: Cell Press
- Frequency: Monthly
- Open access: Yes
- Impact factor: 5.0 (2024)

Standard abbreviations
- ISO 4: Stem Cell Rep.

Indexing
- ISSN: 2213-6711
- LCCN: 2013243500
- OCLC no.: 852641949

Links
- Journal homepage; Online access

Stem Cell Reports is a monthly peer-reviewed open access journal covering research into stem cells. It was established in 2013 and is published exclusively online by Cell Press. It is the official journal of the International Society for Stem Cell Research. The editor-in-chief is Martin Pera (Jackson Laboratory). According to the Journal Citation Reports, the journal has a 2024 impact factor of 5.0.
