= Cell Stem Cell =

- Discipline: Developmental biology
- Language: English
- Edited by: Sheila Chari

Publication details
- History: 2007–present
- Publisher: Cell Press
- Frequency: Monthly
- Open access: Delayed, after 12 months
- Impact factor: 19.8 (2023)

Standard abbreviations
- ISO 4: Cell Stem Cell

Indexing
- ISSN: 1934-5909 (print); 1875-9777 (web)

Links
- Journal homepage; Online access

Cell Stem Cell is a peer-reviewed scientific journal published by Cell Press, an imprint of Elsevier.

== History ==
The journal was established in 2007 and focuses on stem cell research.

Both research articles and reviews are published, at about a 7 to 1 ratio.
