= Jo-Anne H. Young =

American physician

- Born: Jo-Anne van Burik
- Scientific career
- Fields: transplantation; infectious diseases; mycology; virology
- Institutions: Clinical Microbiology Reviews; University of Minnesota

Jo-Anne H. Young (née van Burik) is an American physician, scientist, and Editor-in-Chief of Clinical Microbiology Reviews, published by the American Society for Microbiology.

Her expertise is in the areas of transplantation, infectious diseases, infections of the immune compromised host, and clinical mycology and virology.

She is Medical Director of the Adult Transplant Infectious Disease Program at the University of Minnesota. Other responsibilities that Young has with the University of Minnesota include the Institutional Review Board, Co-chair of the Supportive Care/Infectious Disease/Toxicities Site Team for the Cancer Center, Physician Informatics Committee at the Medical Center, and Clinical Service Unit Board in the Department of Medicine.

== Life ==
Before coming to the University of Minnesota in 1999, she worked at the Fred Hutchinson Cancer Research Center with the University of Washington in Seattle, from 1993 to 1998. She completed an internal medicine residency at Vanderbilt University Medical Center in Nashville, Tennessee, from 1990 to 1993. She completed her M.D. degree at Case Western Reserve University in Cleveland, Ohio, in 1990.
