= Cancer Cell (journal) =

- Discipline: Oncology
- Language: English
- Edited by: Steve Mao

Publication details
- History: 2002–present
- Publisher: Cell Press
- Frequency: Monthly
- Open access: Delayed, after 12 months
- Impact factor: 56.1 (2025)

Standard abbreviations
- ISO 4: Cancer Cell

Indexing
- ISSN: 1878-3686

Links
- Journal homepage; Current issue; Online now

Cancer Cell is a peer-reviewed scientific journal scientific journal that publishes articles that provide major advances in cancer research and oncology. The journal considers manuscripts that answer important questions relevant to naturally occurring cancers. Areas covered include basic cancer biology, therapeutic development, translational research, cancer model development, multi-omics and computational biology. Cancer Cell is also interested in publishing clinical investigations, in particular those that lead to establishing new paradigms in the treatment, diagnosis, or prevention of cancers; those that provide important insights into cancer biology beyond what has been revealed by preclinical studies; and those that are mechanism-based proof-of-principle clinical studies.

Cancer Cell is internationally regarded as one of the top cancer research and oncology journals. According to the Journal Citation Reports, the 2025 impact factor of the journal is 56.1. It is part of the Cell Press portfolio, which is owned by Elsevier. Issues are published monthly in print and online versions. All content becomes available for free one year after publication. In January 2021, Cancer Cell became a Transformative Journal as part of Elsevier's efforts to increase Open Access content.

Cancer Cell publishes Research, Review, and Perspective articles, in addition to opinion pieces such as Letters, Commentaries, Previews, Spotlight, and Voices. The journal often publishes a yearly special issue with a compilation of review articles around a common topic. In the Cancer Cell website, articles can be browsed by Issue, Collection, early online access ("Online Now"), or annual "Best of Cancer Cell".

== History ==
Cancer Cell was launched in 2002 with the publication of its inaugural issue on February 1, 2002. In an Editorial published in this first issue, Editor-in-Chief Mariana Resnicoff introduced Cancer Cell as "An exciting forum for cancer research". Following in the footsteps of the Cell Press flagship journal Cell, the goal of Cancer Cell was to publish cutting-edge findings in cancer research and to provide great author service by having a team of dedicated scientific editors that hold the highest standards of excellence, editorial consistency, and author service. Li-Kuo Su became Editor-in-Chief in 2003 and is recognized for promoting the journal's growth and establishing it as one of the most reputable cancer research journals. He retired from his editorial activities in 2019. Steve Mao became Cancer Cell's Editor-in-Chief in 2020 after serving as senior editor at Cell and Science.

=== Changing for a better future editorial ===
In the April 2020 special issue of Cancer Cell, Steve Mao published the editorial "Changing for a Better Future" delineating his views for the journal. This Editorial reiterated the journal's commitment to scientific excellence and introduced key changes. While Cancer Cell is traditionally considered a journal interested in strong mechanistic studies, the Editorial highlights its interest in translational and clinical studies, as well in discovery papers that scientifically sound and conceptually bold. In line with the Cell Press rebranding strategy launched in 2020, Steve Mao vowed to continue publishing "Science that Inspires". The Editorial also states the editors' commitment to increase communication with its scientific community and authors, as well as to work with authors to improve the revision process of manuscripts under consideration.

=== Diversity and inclusion efforts ===
In 2020, Cancer Cell made a number of changes to increase diversity and inclusion of underrepresented minorities in cancer research and oncology. In June 2020, the journal announced the new members of its advisory board (previously editorial board), which includes a higher representation of female scientists (>40%) and physicians (~50%) and higher geographical and ethnic diversity. That same month, the Cell Editorial Team published the editorial "Science has a racism problem", acknowledging the underrepresentation of Black scientists in STEM in the wake of the murders of George Floyd, Breonna Taylor, and Ahmaud Arbery. These events, in conjunction with the anti-immigration policies of the Trump administration in the U.S., led to a Summer of social reckoning in the scientific community. Cancer Cell joined the cancer research and oncology communities and their call for action and change by dedicating its September 2020 issue to the importance of diversity and immigration in cancer research in the U.S. and publishing a series of opinion pieces by scientists and clinicians that represent several minorities (immigrants, Black, Latinx, LGBTQ) and their allies. The journal has also published several articles that address ethnic health disparities and aim to increase the representation of non-Caucasian populations in cancer research and oncology.

As a part of Cell Press, Cancer Cell has supported Black in Cancer and the #BlackInCancerWeek campaign on Twitter. The journal also participated in the creation of the "Rising Black Scientists Award", a cash award granted to one undergraduate student and one graduate student or postdoctoral trainee "meant to break down barriers and create opportunities by providing funds to support professional development".

In January 2021, Cell Press introduced the Inclusion and Diversity Statement, in which authors may choose to disclose information related to how they are increasing their effort to promote genetic diversity in their study subjects, participation of minorities, and balancing gender representation, to name a few.
