= Joule (journal) =

- Discipline: Sustainability
- Language: English
- Edited by: Philip Earis

Publication details
- History: 2017–present
- Publisher: Cell Press
- Frequency: Monthly
- Open access: Delayed (12 months)
- Impact factor: 37.1 (2025)

Standard abbreviations
- ISO 4: Joule

Indexing
- ISSN: 2542-4785 (print); 2542-4351 (web)
- LCCN: 2019204193

Links
- Journal homepage; Online archive

Joule is a monthly peer-reviewed scientific journal published by Cell Press. It was established in 2017 as a sister journal to Cell. The editor-in-chief is Philip Earis.

== Abstracting and indexing ==
The journal is abstracted and indexed in:

- Compendex
- GEOBASE
- INSPEC
- Science Citation Index Expanded
- Scopus

According to the Journal Citation Reports, the journal has a 2025 impact factor of 37.1.
