= Nature Microbiology =

- Discipline: Microbiology
- Language: English
- Edited by: Susan Jones

Publication details
- History: 2016–present
- Publisher: Nature Portfolio (UK)
- Frequency: Monthly
- Open access: Hybrid
- Impact factor: 18.7 (2025)

Standard abbreviations
- ISO 4: Nat. Microbiol.

Indexing
- CODEN: NMAICH
- ISSN: 2058-5276
- LCCN: 2016247755
- OCLC no.: 934998403

Links
- Journal homepage; Online archive

Nature Microbiology is a monthly online-only peer reviewed scientific journal published by Nature Portfolio. It was established in 2016. The editor-in-chief is Susan Jones who is part of an in-house team of editors.

== Abstracting and indexing ==
The journal is abstracted and indexed in:

- PubMed
- Science Citation Index Expanded
- Scopus

According to the Journal Citation Reports, the journal has a 2025 impact factor of 18.7

== See also ==
- Nature Reviews Microbiology
- Gut Microbes
- Cell Host & Microbe
- Clinical Microbiology Reviews
