= Trends (journals) =

Series of review journals

Trends Cell Press
- Discipline: Biology and chemistry
- Language: English

Publication details
- History: 1976–present
- Publisher: Cell Press
- Frequency: Monthly
- Open access: Hybrid

Links
- Journal homepage

Trends is a series of 16 review journals in a range of areas of biology and chemistry published under its Cell Press imprint by Elsevier. The publisher in lieu is Danielle Loughlin.

The Trends series was established in 1976 with Trends in Biochemical Sciences, rapidly followed by Trends in Neurosciences, Trends in Pharmacological Sciences, and Immunology Today.

Immunology Today, Parasitology Today, and Molecular Medicine Today changed their names to Trends in... in 2001. Drug Discovery Today was spun off as an independent brand.

== Titles ==
The current set of Trends journals are all published monthly:

Title	ISO 4 abbreviation	Field	Editor	Started	Impact factor 2022	Website
Trends in Biochemical Sciences	Trends Biochem. Sci.	Biochemistry	Sannie Culbertson	1976	13.8	
Trends in Biotechnology	Trends Biotechnol.	Biotechnology	Matthew Pavlovich	1983	17.8	
Trends in Cancer	Trends Cancer	Oncology	Danielle Loughlin	2015	18.4	
Trends in Cell Biology	Trends Cell Biol.	Cell biology	Ilaria Carnevale	1991	19.0	
Trends in Chemistry	Trends Chem.	Chemistry	Jessica Pancholi	2019	15.7	
Trends in Cognitive Sciences	Trends Cognit. Sci.	Cognitive science	Lindsey Drayton	1997	19.9	
Trends in Ecology & Evolution	Trends Ecol. Evol.	Evolutionary ecology	Andrea Stephens	1986	16.8	
Trends in Endocrinology and Metabolism	Trends Endrocrinol. Metab.	Endocrinology and Metabolism	Salvatore Fabbiano	1990	10.9	
Trends in Genetics	Trends Genet.	Genetics	Maria Smit	1985	11.4	
Trends in Immunology (formerly Immunology Today)	Trends Immunol. (Immunol. Today)	Immunology	Catarina Sacristan	1980	16.8	
Trends in Microbiology	Trends Microbiol.	Microbiology	Shankar Iyer	1993	15.9	
Trends in Molecular Medicine (formerly Molecular Medicine Today)	Trends. Mol. Med. (Mol. Med. Today)	Molecular Medicine	Aliki Perdikari	1995	13.6	
Trends in Neurosciences	Trends Neurosci.	Neuroscience	Moran Furman	1978	15.9	
Trends in Parasitology (formerly Parasitology Today)	Trends Parasitol. (Parasitol. Today)	Parasitology	Pengfei Kong	1985	9.6	
Trends in Pharmacological Sciences	Trends Pharmacol. Sci.	Pharmacology	Jerry Madukwe	1979	13.8	
Trends in Plant Science	Trends Plant Sci.	Botany	Susanne Brink	1996	20.5	
