= Matter (journal) =

- Discipline: Materials science
- Language: English
- Edited by: Steven W. Cranford

Publication details
- History: 2019-present
- Publisher: Cell Press
- Frequency: Monthly
- Open access: Yes
- Impact factor: 19.967 (2021)

Standard abbreviations
- ISO 4: Matter

Indexing
- CODEN: MATTCG
- ISSN: 2590-2393 (print); 2590-2385 (web)
- OCLC no.: 1136390901

Links
- Journal homepage; Online access; Online archive; Journal page at ScienceDirect

Matter is a peer-reviewed scientific journal that covers the general field of materials science. It is published by Cell Press and the editor-in-chief is Steven W. Cranford.
