= Drug Discovery Today =

Monthly peer-reviewed scientific journal

- Language: English
- Edited by: Stephen Carney

Publication details
- History: 1996–present
- Publisher: Elsevier
- Impact factor: 8.2 (2022)

Standard abbreviations
- ISO 4: Drug Discov. Today

Indexing
- ISSN: 1359-6446

Links
- Journal homepage

Drug Discovery Today is a monthly peer-reviewed scientific journal that is published by Elsevier. It was established in 1996 and publishes reviews on all aspects of preclinical drug discovery from target identification and validation through hit identification, lead identification and optimisation, to candidate selection.

In 2004, the Drug Discovery Today journal series expanded with the launch of four online-only review journals: Drug Discovery Today: Disease Mechanisms, Drug Discovery Today: Disease Models, Drug Discovery Today: Therapeutic Strategies, and Drug Discovery Today: Technologies. The four journals cover developments across the breadth of therapeutic areas and technologies relevant to the drug discovery and development pipeline. However, as of 2022, these titles have been discontinued and incorporated back into Drug Discovery Today.

According to the Journal Citation Reports, the journal has a 2022 impact factor of 8.2.

== See also ==
- Trends in Pharmacological Sciences
