= Cell Host & Microbe =

- Discipline: Microbiology
- Language: English
- Edited by: Lakshmi Goyal, Ella Hinson, Amanda Monahan, Caeul Lim

Publication details
- History: 2007–present
- Publisher: Cell Press
- Frequency: Monthly
- Open access: Delayed, after 12 months
- Impact factor: 18.3 (2024)

Standard abbreviations
- ISO 4: Cell Host Microbe

Indexing
- ISSN: 1931-3128
- OCLC no.: 86107345

Links
- Journal homepage; On-line archive

Cell Host & Microbe is a peer-reviewed scientific journal published by Cell Press. It was established in March 2007 and focuses broadly on the study of microbes, with an emphasis on the interface between the microbe and its host. The journal is run by in-house editorial and production teams with full responsibility for selecting and preparing content for publication.

== See also ==
- Gut Microbes
- Nature Microbiology
- Nature Reviews Microbiology
- Clinical Microbiology Reviews
