= Josephine A. Morello =

American microbiologist

- Born: Boston, MA
- Education: Simmons College; Boston University
- Scientific career
- Workplaces: Columbia University College of Physicians and Surgeons; University of Chicago

Josephine Morello, Ph.D., an American microbiologist, is the founder and first editor-in-chief of the American Society for Microbiology's Clinical Microbiology Reviews. She is also a founding co-editor of the Clinical Microbiology Newsletter.

Her expertise is in the area of clinical microbiology. Besides her numerous publications in the field, one of her major achievements was her work on automation in the clinical microbiology laboratory. Because of this, automation is now the standard in clinical microbiology labs.

== Biography ==
In 1969, she was the first woman to earn certification by the American Board of Medical Microbiology. Prior to her long career at the University of Chicago Hospitals, she was an assistant professor of microbiology at the College of Physicians and Surgeons at Columbia University. She retired from her positions of hospital laboratories director and Department of Pathology vice chair at the University of Chicago in 2001.

== Honors ==
- Fellow, American Academy of Microbiology (1973 to present)
- Board member of the American Board of Medical Microbiology Standard and Examination Committee
- American Society for Microbiology Distinguished Service Award and Professional Recognition Award, American Board of Medical Microbiology
- Pasteur Award for the Illinois Society of Microbiology (1988)
