= Immunity (journal) =

- Discipline: Immunology
- Language: English
- Edited by: Peter T. Lee

Publication details
- History: 1994–present
- Publisher: Cell Press (United States)
- Frequency: Monthly
- Open access: Delayed, after 12 months
- Impact factor: 25.7 (2024)

Standard abbreviations
- ISO 4: Immunity

Indexing
- CODEN: IUNIEH
- ISSN: 1074-7613 (print); 1097-4180 (web)
- LCCN: 94648455
- OCLC no.: 37832296

Links
- Journal homepage; Online access; Online archive; Journal page on publisher's website

Immunity is a monthly peer-reviewed medical journal of immunology published by Cell Press.

== History ==
The first issue of the journal was published in April 1994. As of 2023, the journal is edited by Peter T. Lee. According to the Journal Citation Reports, the journal had a 2020 impact factor of 31.745.

== Abstracting and indexing ==
The journal is abstracted and indexed in:

- Academic OneFile
- Academic Search
- Biological Abstracts
- BIOSIS Previews
- CAB Abstracts
- Chemical Abstracts
- Current Contents - Life Sciences
- Elsevier BIOBASE
- Embase
- Global Health
- Index Medicus/MEDLINE/PubMed
- Science Citation Index Expanded
- Scopus
- Tropical Diseases Bulletin
