= Journal of Unsolved Questions =

- Subject: Null results
- Language: English
- Edited by: Thomas D. Kühne

Publication details
- History: 2011–present
- Publisher: JUnQ e. V. (Germany)
- Frequency: Biannually
- Open access: Yes

Standard abbreviations
- ISO 4: J. Unsolved Quest.

Indexing
- ISSN: 2192-0745 (print); 2192-0753 (web)
- OCLC no.: 704837772

Links
- Journal homepage; Online archive

The Journal of Unsolved Questions or JUnQ is an open access peer-reviewed scientific journal which publishes null results. Based in Mainz, Germany, it features articles from multiple disciplines.

== History ==
Negative or null results are often not published by scientific journals, leading to other scientists unnecessarily repeating their colleagues' work. In order to make previous null results publicly available, scientists at the Johannes Gutenberg University Mainz established the Journal of Unsolved Questions in 2011.
