= Trends in Cognitive Sciences =

- Language: English
- Edited by: Lindsey Drayton

Publication details
- History: 1997–present
- Publisher: Elsevier (United States)
- Frequency: Monthly
- Impact factor: 15.402 (2016)

Standard abbreviations
- ISO 4: Trends Cogn. Sci.

Indexing
- CODEN: TCSCFK
- ISSN: 1364-6613
- LCCN: 97643374
- OCLC no.: 865263317

Links
- Journal homepage; Online access; Online archive

Trends in Cognitive Sciences (TiCS) is a monthly peer-reviewed review journal published by Cell Press. It is one of 14 journals in the Trends series. As of 2021, its editor is Lindsey Drayton. Journal Citation Reports (Thomson Reuters) lists its 2016 impact factor at 15.402.
