= Timothy Coulson =

British biologist

Tim Coulson
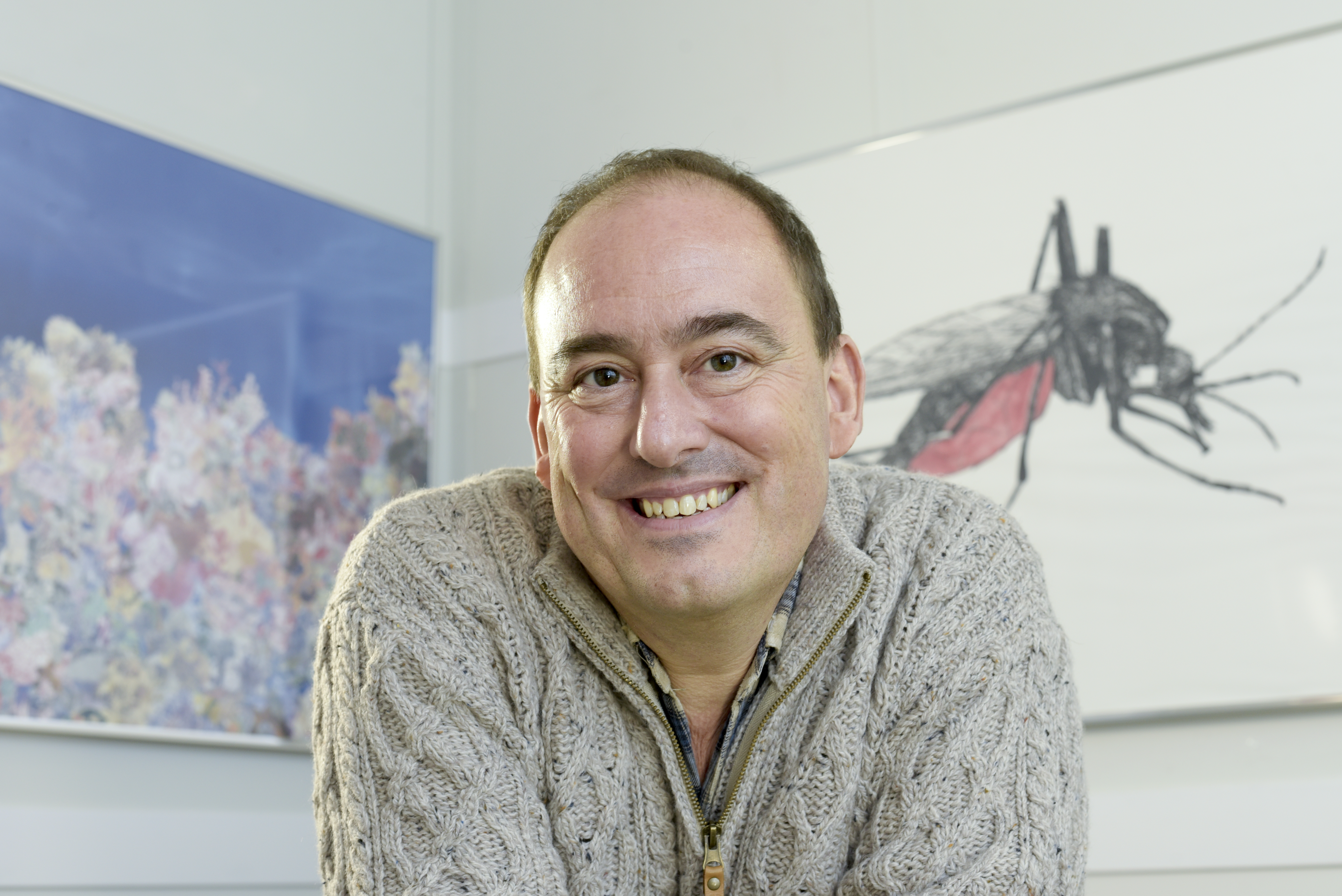
- Coulson in 2018
- Born: 31 July 1968 (age 58); Cambridge
- Occupations: Biologist and author
- Title: Professor of Zoology
- Spouse: Sonya Clegg (m. 2014)
- Awards: Scientific Medal of ZSL

Academic work
- Discipline: Ecology and Evolution
- Institutions: University of Oxford

Timothy Neal Coulson FRSB, FBES FRS (Born 31 July 1968) is a biologist whose research focuses on how environmental change impacts the ecology and evolutionary biology of animals. He is the current Professor of Zoology and a Professorial Fellow of Jesus College, Oxford and was until October 2024 joint head of the Department of Biology at the University of Oxford. Coulson was elected a Fellow of the Royal Society in May 2026.

== Life and career ==
He held a series of positions becoming Professor of Population Biology at Imperial College London in 2007. He was appointed Professor of Zoology at the University of Oxford and professorial fellow of Jesus College Oxford in 2013. He was head of Department of Zoology, University of Oxford between 2018 and 2021 and joint head of Department of Biology, University of Oxford along with Mark Fricker from October 2022 to October 2024. Along with fellow University of Oxford academic, Professor Syma Khalid, Coulson cohosts the Science of the Times podcast.

Coulson has been chief editor of Journal of Animal Ecology and Ecology Letters, a member of council of the University of Oxford, and is currently Vice President (membership) of the British Ecological Society.

Coulson’s book The Universal History of Us was published on 13 June 2024 by Michael Joseph, an imprint of Penguin Books. The paperback version was published by the same publisher in May 2025 with the title A Little History of Everything . It was published in the United States on 6 July 2024 as The Science of Why We Exist by Pegasus Books.

Coulson was the subject of an episode of The Life Scientific, broadcast by BBC Radio Four on 27 May 2025.

He is married to a fellow Oxford Professor, Sonya M Clegg and has three children from a previous relationship (two daughters and one son).

In July 2024, Coulson was a guest on the Off the Shelf podcast.

== Awards and honours ==
- Zoological Society of London Scientific Medal (2007)
- Imperial College Post-graduate Huxley Memorial Medal (2008)
- Per Brinck Award (2012)
- Royal Society Wolfson Research Merit Award (2012)
- British Ecological Society Marsh Award (2012)
- Fellowship of the British Ecological Society (2025)
- Fellow of the Royal Society (2026)

== Selected publications ==
- Coulson, T. et al. (2001). Age, sex, density, winter weather, and population crashes in Soay sheep. Science, 292(5521), 1528-1531. DOI: 10.1126/science.292.5521.1528
- Cubaynes, S. ... & Coulson, T. (2022). Disease outbreaks select for mate choice and coat color in wolves. Science, 378(6617), 300-303. DOI: 10.1126/science.abi8745
- Coulson, T., Mace, G. M., Hudson, E., & Possingham, H. (2001). The use and abuse of population viability analysis. Trends in Ecology & Evolution, 16(5), 219-221. https://doi.org/10.1016/S0169-5347(01)02137-1
