= Erik J. Sontheimer =

American molecular biologist

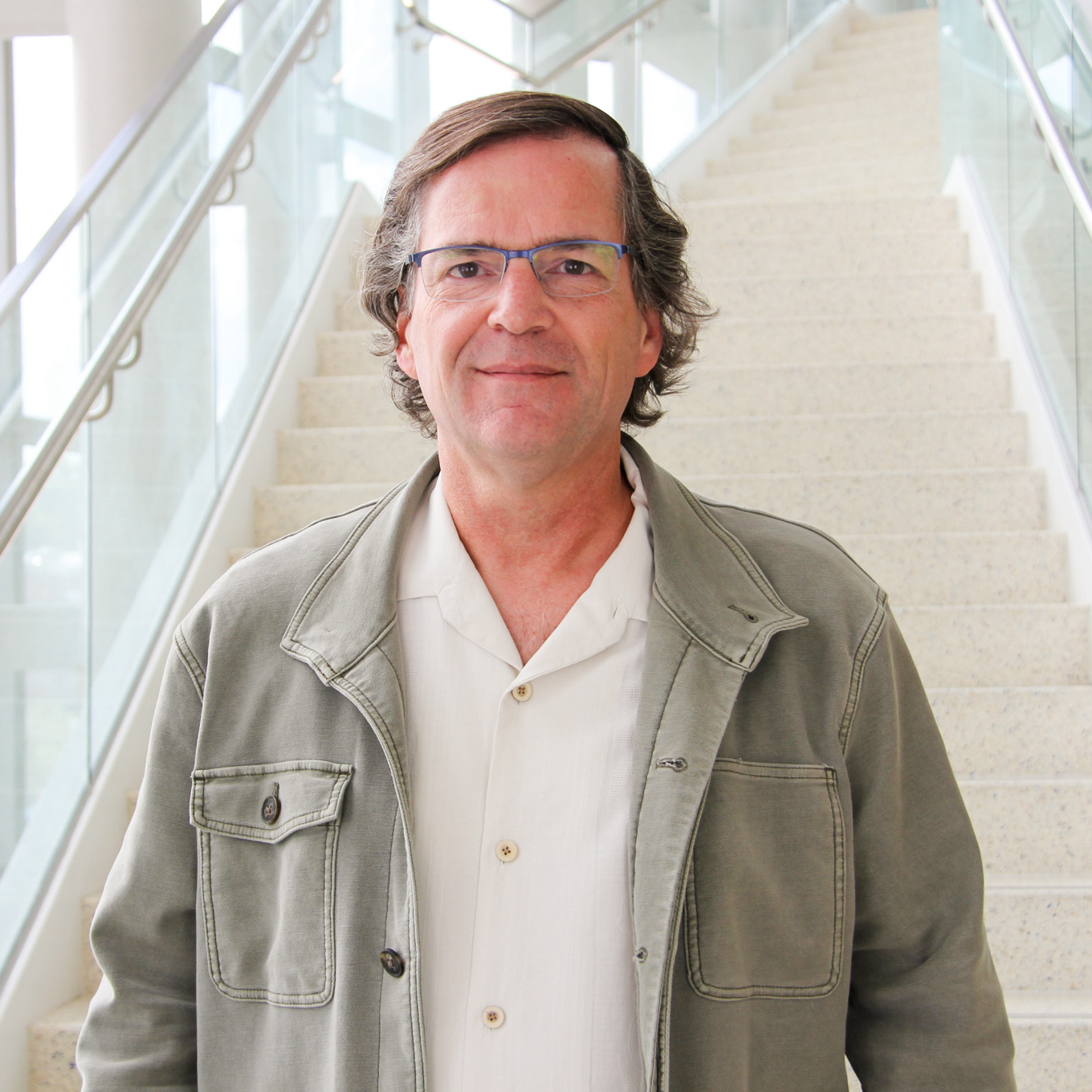
- Education: Yale University, PhD Pennsylvania State University, BSc
- Known for: CRISPR
- Scientific career
- Fields: RNA Biology, biochemistry, microbiology, molecular biology, CRISPR, genome editing
- Workplaces: UMass Chan Medical School (2014–present) Northwestern University (1999–2014)
- Website: https://www.umassmed.edu/sontheimerlab/

Erik J. Sontheimer is an American molecular biologist and professor at the University of Massachusetts Chan Medical School, where he holds the Pillar Chair in Biomedical Research. and is vice chair of the RNA Therapeutics Institute. His research focuses on RNA-mediated mechanisms of gene regulation, including pre-mRNA splicing, RNA interference (RNAi), and CRISPR–Cas adaptive immune systems, with implications for genome engineering and therapeutic development.

== Academic career ==
Sontheimer earned his Ph.D. in 1992 from Yale University, where he conducted doctoral research on pre-mRNA splicing mechanisms in the laboratory of Joan A. Steitz. His graduate work contributed to the understanding of spliceosomal structure and function, including the roles of small nuclear RNAs in catalysis. He subsequently completed postdoctoral training in biochemistry and molecular biology at the University of Chicago, working with Edwin Ferguson and later with Joseph Piccirilli. Sontheimer joined the faculty of Northwestern University in 1999 as an assistant professor in the Department of Molecular Biosciences. He was promoted to associate professor in 2006 and to professor in 2012. In 2014, Sontheimer moved to the University of Massachusetts Chan Medical School, where he became a professor in the RNA Therapeutics Institute. In 2020, he was named Pillar Chair in Biomedical Research. Dr. Sontheimer has more than 27,000 citations on Google Scholar.

== Research contributions ==
=== RNA splicing and catalysis ===
Early in his career, Sontheimer developed and applied site-specific RNA crosslinking and “atomic mutagenesis” approaches to study spliceosome structure and function. This work provided evidence that small nuclear RNAs participate directly in the spliceosomal active site and helped establish the role of metal ions in pre-mRNA splicing catalysis. His later research as a principal investigator examined regulatory mechanisms governing spliceosome assembly and dynamics, including the involvement of ubiquitin-mediated processes.

=== RNA interference and small RNA pathways ===
Beginning in the early 2000s, Sontheimer contributed to the mechanistic understanding of RNA interference (RNAi) with student, John Pham, in collaboration with Richard Carthew. His research helped distinguish the roles of distinct Dicer enzymes in microRNA and small interfering RNA pathways and characterized key steps in the assembly and function of RNA-induced silencing complexes.

=== CRISPR–Cas systems and genome engineering ===
Sontheimer’s laboratory made foundational contributions to the study of CRISPR–Cas adaptive immune systems in bacteria. In 2008, he and postdoc Luciano Marrafini reported that CRISPR–Cas pathways can destroy DNA, advancing understanding of CRISPR interference and its role in limiting horizontal gene transfer. Subsequent work addressed mechanisms of self–non-self discrimination in CRISPR immunity and the diversity of guide RNA biogenesis strategies

Sontheimer's subsequent research focused on Type II CRISPR–Cas9 systems, including compact Cas9 orthologs with properties favorable for genome engineering. His laboratory also co-discovered naturally occurring anti-CRISPR proteins and demonstrated their utility as molecular regulators of CRISPR activity. Additional work expanded genome-editing and genome-analysis tools, including approaches for improving delivery, specificity, and control of CRISPR-based systems.

== Selected awards and honors ==
- RNA Society Mid-Career Award, 2018
- Elected to the American Academy of Microbiology, 2016
- Nestlé Award, American Society for Microbiology, 2008
- Weinberg College of Arts and Sciences Distinguished Teaching Award, 2005
- American Cancer Society Scholar Award, 2004
- Basil O’Connor Starter Scholar Research Award, March of Dimes Foundation, 2001
- National Science Foundation CAREER Award, 2001
- Burroughs Welcome Fund New Investigator Award in the Pharmacological Sciences, 2000
- Fellow, The Jane Coffin Childs Memorial Fund for Medical Research, 1993-1996

== Service and editorial roles ==
Sontheimer has served in national scientific leadership and advisory roles, including membership on the National Cancer Institute Board of Scientific Counselors, where he served as co-chair from 2021 to 2023. He also served as co-chair of the Steering Committee for the National Institutes of Health Somatic Cell Genome Editing Program. He has held editorial positions with several scientific journals, including RNA, Human Gene Therapy, EMBO Reports, and The CRISPR Journal, and has served on governance and review panels for the RNA Society and the National Institutes of Health.

== Involvement with biotechnology ==
In 2014, Sontheimer co-founded Intellia Therapeutics, a biotechnology company focused on the clinical development of CRISPR-based gene-editing technologies. He serves as a scientific advisor for Tessera Therapeutics and has also participated in advisory roles for other biotechnology organizations.

== Selected publications ==
- Liu, B. ^{#}, Dong, X. ^{#}, Zheng, C. W. ^{#}, Keener, D., Chen, Z., Cheng, H., Watts, J. K., Xue, W.*, and Sontheimer, E. J.* (2024) Targeted genome editing with a DNA-dependent DNA polymerase and exogenous DNA-containing templates. Nature Biotechnology 42, 1039-1045. PMID: 37709915; PMCID: PMC12054351.
- Liu, B.^{#}, Dong, X. ^{#}, Cheng, H., Zheng, C., Chen, Z., Rodríguez, T. C., Liang, S.-Q., Xue, W.*, and Sontheimer, E. J.* (2022) A split prime editor with untethered reverse transcriptase and circular RNA template. Nature Biotechnology 40, 1388-1393. PMID: 35379962; PMCID: in process.
- Edraki, A., Mir, A., Ibraheim, R., Gainetdinov, I., Yoon, Y., Gallant, J., Song, C.-Q., Cao, Y., Xue, W., Rivera-Pérez, J. A., and Sontheimer, E. J.* (2018) A compact, hyper-accurate Cas9 with a dinucleotide PAM for in vivo genome editing. Molecular Cell, 73, 714-726. PMID: 30581144; PMCID: PMC6386616.
- Pawluk, A., Amrani, N., Zhang, Y., Garcia, B., Hidalgo-Reyes, Y., Lee, J., Edraki, A., Shah, M., Sontheimer, E. J.*, Maxwell, K.*, and Davidson, A.* (2016) Naturally occurring off-switches for CRISPR-Cas9. Cell, 167, 1829-1838. PMID: 27984730; PMCID: PMC5757841.
- Marraffini, L. A. and Sontheimer, E. J.* (2010). CRISPR interference: RNA-directed adaptive immunity in bacteria and archaea. Nature Reviews Genetics 11, 181-190. PMID: 20125085; PMCID: PMC2928866.
- Marraffini, L. A. and Sontheimer, E. J.* (2010). Self vs. non-self discrimination during CRISPR RNA-directed immunity. Nature, 463, 568-571. PMID: 20072129; PMCID: PMC2813891.
- Carthew, R. W.* and Sontheimer, E. J.* (2009). Origins and mechanisms of siRNAs and miRNAs. Cell 136, 642-655. PMID: 19239886; PMCID: PMC2675692.
- Marrafini L. A. and Sontheimer, E. J.* (2008). CRISPR interference limits horizontal gene transfer in staphylococci by targeting DNA. Science, 322, 1843-1845. PMID: 19095942; PMCID: PMC2695655.
- Pham, J. W., Pellino, J. L., Lee, Y. S., Carthew, R. W. and Sontheimer, E. J.* (2004). A Dicer-2-dependent 80S complex cleaves targeted mRNAs during RNAi in Drosophila. Cell, 117, 83-94. PMID: 15066284.
- Sontheimer, E. J. and Steitz, J. A.* (1993). The U5 and U6 small nuclear RNAs as active site components of the spliceosome. Science, 262, 1989-1996. PMID: 8266094.
