= Benjamin Lewin =

- Education: Cambridge University; University of London
- Known for: Genes
- Scientific career
- Fields: Molecular biology

Benjamin Lewin is a molecular biologist who founded the journal Cell and authored the textbook Genes. He is credited with building Cell into a recognized journal of cellular biology in a short period of time to rival Nature and Science.

Following a tutorial session at the University of Sussex, Lewin became editor of Nature New Biology. He left to work at the National Institutes of Health and, while working there, developed his ideas for a comprehensive biology journal. He founded Cell in 1974 and it was published by the MIT Press until 1986, when Lewin bought the title outright, founding his own independent publishing company, Cell Press. Lewin is also author of the best-selling molecular biology textbook series Genes published by Jones & Bartlett Learning, now in its 12th edition. He sold Cell Press to Elsevier in 1999.

Lewin is a Master of Wine and has published widely on the subject, contributing regularly to TONG, The World of Fine Wine and Decanter magazine as well as writing a number of books on the subject.

== Bibliography ==
- Lewin, Benjamin (1970), The molecular basis of gene expression, John Wiley & Sons Inc
- Lewin, Benjamin (1975), Gene Expression 1: Bacterial Genomes, John Wiley & Sons Inc
- Lewin, Benjamin (1980), Gene Expression 2: Eucaryotic Chromosomes, John Wiley & Sons Inc
- Lewin, Benjamin (1977), Gene Expression 3: Plasmids and Phages, John Wiley & Sons Inc
- Lewin, Benjamin (1983), Genes, John Wiley & Sons Inc
- Lewin, Benjamin (1985), Genes II, John Wiley & Sons Inc
- Lewin, Benjamin (1987), Genes III, John Wiley & Sons Inc
- Lewin, Benjamin (1990), Genes IV, Oxford University Press
- Lewin, Benjamin (1994), Genes V, Oxford University Press
- Lewin, Benjamin (1997), Genes VI, Oxford University Press
- Lewin, Benjamin (1999), Genes VII, Oxford University Press
- Lewin, Benjamin (2003), Genes VIII, Oxford University Press
- Lewin, Benjamin (2005), Essential Genes, Pearson
- Lewin, Benjamin (2006), Cells, Jones & Bartlett Learning
- Lewin, Benjamin (2007), Genes IX, Jones & Bartlett Learning
- Lewin, Benjamin; Krebs, Jocelyn E.; Goldstein, Elliott S.; Kilpatrick, Stephen T. (2011), Genes X, Jones & Bartlett Learning
- Lewin, Benjamin; Krebs, Jocelyn E.; Goldstein, Elliott S.; Kilpatrick, Stephen T. (2014), Genes XI, Jones & Bartlett Learning
- Lewin, Benjamin (2009), What Price Bordeaux?, Wine Appreciation Guild
- Lewin, Benjamin (2010), Wine Myths and Realities, Vendange Press
- Lewin, Benjamin (2011), In Search of Pinot Noir, Wine Appreciation Guild
