= PLOS Neglected Tropical Diseases =

- Discipline: Tropical Diseases
- Language: English
- Edited by: Shaden Kamhawi and Paul Brindley

Publication details
- History: 2007-present
- Publisher: Public Library of Science
- Frequency: Monthly
- Open access: Yes
- License: Creative Commons Attribution 2.5
- Impact factor: 3.4 (2024)

Standard abbreviations
- ISO 4: PLOS Negl. Trop. Dis.

Indexing
- ISSN: 1935-2727 (print); 1935-2735 (web)
- LCCN: 2006216375
- OCLC no.: 77500770

Links
- Journal homepage; Online access

PLOS Neglected Tropical Diseases is a peer-reviewed open access scientific journal devoted to the study of neglected tropical diseases, including helminth, bacterial, viral, protozoan, and fungal infections endemic to tropical regions. PLOS Neglected Tropical Diseases is abstracted and indexed in PubMed and the Web of Science. It is the seventh and youngest member of the Public Library of Science family of open access journals.

Established in 2007 by founding editor Peter Hotez, with US$1.1 million in grant support from the Bill & Melinda Gates Foundation, PLOS Neglected Tropical Diseases was created to be "both catalytic and transformative in promoting science, policy, and advocacy for these diseases of the poor."

As with all journals of the Public Library of Science, PLOS Neglected Tropical Diseases is financed by charging authors a publication fee, while advertising from companies that sell drugs or medical devices are not accepted. It will waive the fee for authors who do not have the funds. The usage and reproduction of PLOS Neglected Tropical Diseases articles are subject to a Creative Commons Attribution License, version 2.5. In 2021, the journal expanded the scope of its coverage.
