= Paul Brindley (biologist) =

Australian parasitologist

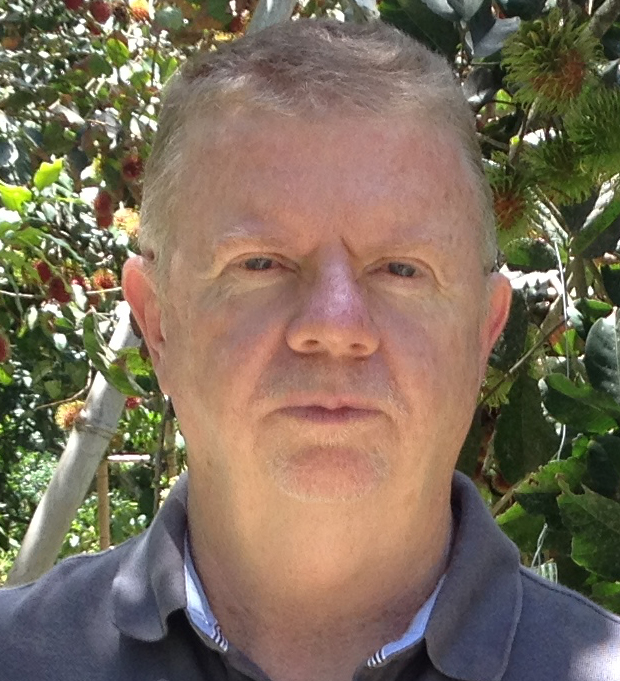
- Born: 1954 (age 71–72); Brisbane, Australia
- Education: University of Queensland
- Spouse: Victoria Mann
- Children: Meredith Brindley
- Scientific career
- Fields: Helminthology, Tropical Medicine
- Workplaces: George Washington University, QIMR Berghofer Medical Research Institute, Tulane University, University College Dublin

Paul J Brindley (born 1954) is an Australian parasitologist, microbiologist, and helminthologist. He is professor of Microbiology, Immunology, and Tropical Medicine at the George Washington University.

== Education & Career ==
Paul Brindley received a doctorate from the University of Queensland, Brisbane, Australia and completed postdoctoral training at the NIAID's Laboratory of Parasitic Diseases, National Institutes of Health, Bethesda, Maryland.

He has held faculty level appointments at the QIMR Berghofer Medical Research Institute, Brisbane, Australia, University College Dublin, Ireland, and Tulane University, New Orleans, Louisiana, where he was the William Vincent Professor of Tropical Medicine. He was the recipient of the Scholar Award in Molecular Parasitology, Infectious Diseases Research of the Burroughs Wellcome Fund (2001-2006), and is a Fellow of the American Society of Tropical Medicine and Hygiene. He is co-Editor-in-Chief of PLOS Neglected Tropical Diseases.

His current research focuses on neglected tropical diseases (NTDs) and NTD associated cancers. He is pursuing functional genomics and other approaches to characterize new disease interventions. Brindley and co-investigators reported the activity of CRISPR-Cas programmed editing of the human blood fluke, Schistosoma mansoni and the human liver fluke, Opisthorchis viverrini.

In December 2019, he was awarded by Khon Kaen University, Thailand a Doctorate of Science, honoris causa.
