= Structure (journal) =

- Discipline: Structural biology, protein structure, nucleic acid structure
- Language: English
- Edited by: Karin Kühnel

Publication details
- Former names: Structure with Folding & Design
- History: 1993–present
- Publisher: Cell Press
- Frequency: Monthly
- Open access: Hybrid
- Impact factor: 4.2 (2024)

Standard abbreviations
- ISO 4: Structure

Indexing
- ISSN: 0969-2126 (print); 1878-4186 (web)
- OCLC no.: 28867361

Links
- Journal homepage; Online access; Online archive

Structure is a monthly peer-reviewed scientific journal established in September 1993 by Wayne Hendrickson, Carl-Ivar Brändén, and Alan R. Fersht. It focuses on structural biology, studies of macromolecular structure, and related issues. In early 1999, the journal merged with Folding & Design and the name changed to Structure with Folding & Design. In 2001, the journal reverted to Structure.

The journal is published by Cell Press and Christopher D. Lima and Andrej Sali served as editors-in-chief from 2003 to October 2021. The journal is now edited by an in-house team at Cell Press, with Karin Kühnel as editor-in-chhief.
