= Developmental Cell =

- Discipline: Cell biology, developmental biology
- Language: English
- Edited by: Julie Sollier

Publication details
- History: 2001–present
- Publisher: Cell Press
- Frequency: 24/year
- Open access: Delayed, 1 year
- Impact factor: 8.6 (2023)

Standard abbreviations
- ISO 4: Dev. Cell

Indexing
- CODEN: DCEEBE
- ISSN: 1534-5807
- OCLC no.: 46655943

Links
- Journal homepage; Online access

Developmental Cell is a peer-reviewed scientific journal of cell and developmental biology. The journal was established in 2001, and is edited by Julie Sollier. It published by Cell Press, an imprint of Elsevier, and its articles becomes open access after an embargo period of one year.
