= Current Biology =

- Discipline: Biology
- Language: English
- Edited by: Geoffrey North

Publication details
- History: 1991–present
- Publisher: Cell Press
- Frequency: Biweekly
- Open access: Delayed, after 12 months
- Impact factor: 7.3 (2024)

Standard abbreviations
- ISO 4: Curr. Biol.

Indexing
- ISSN: 0960-9822
- OCLC no.: 45113007

Links
- Journal homepage; Online archive

Current Biology is a biweekly peer-reviewed scientific journal that covers all areas of biology, especially molecular biology, cell biology, genetics, neurobiology, ecology, and evolutionary biology. The journal includes research articles, various types of review articles, as well as an editorial magazine section.

The journal was established in 1991 by the Current Science group, was acquired by Elsevier in 1998, and has since 2001 been part of Cell Press, a subdivision of Elsevier. According to Journal Citation Reports, the journal has a 2020 impact factor of 10.834. It was categorized as a "high impact journal" by the Superfund Research Program.
