= Molecular Plant =

- Discipline: Plant Biology
- Language: English
- Edited by: Molecular Plant

Publication details
- History: 2008-present
- Publisher: Cell Press
- Frequency: Monthly
- Open access: Hybrid
- Impact factor: 12.084 (2019)

Standard abbreviations
- ISO 4: Mol. Plant

Indexing
- ISSN: 1674-2052

Links
- Journal homepage

Molecular Plant is a monthly peer-reviewed scientific journal which publishes both original research and review articles in the field of plant biology, with a particular emphasis on plant cell biology, physiology, biochemistry, molecular biology, genetics, development, plant-microbe interaction, genomics, bioinformatics, and molecular evolution. It is published by Cell Press on behalf of the Chinese Academy of Sciences, the Chinese Society for Plant Biology, and Shanghai Institutes for Biological Sciences with professional editors for the journal working out of a Shanghai office. The journal was established in 2008.

According to the Journal Citation Reports, the journal has a 2019 impact factor of 12.084. In 2018 it was the fourth highest ranked plant science journal by impact factor and the second highest ranked among plant science journals which publish original research. From the establishment of the journal until 2015, it was published by Oxford University Press. In 2015 the journal transitioned to publication by Cell Press.
