= Trends in Plant Science =

- Language: English

Publication details
- Publisher: Cell Press
- Impact factor: 20.8 (2024)

Standard abbreviations
- ISO 4: Trends Plant Sci.

Indexing
- ISSN: 1360-1385

Links
- Journal homepage

Trends in Plant Science is a peer-reviewed scientific journal published by Cell Press.

== Abstracting and indexing ==
The journal is abstracted and indexed in:

- Science Citation Index Expanded
- Scopus
- Chemical Abstracts
- Embase
- MEDLINE

According to the Journal Citation Reports, the journal has a 2024 impact factor of 20.8.
