= Ecology Letters =

- Discipline: Ecology
- Language: English
- Edited by: Peter H. Thrall

Publication details
- History: 1998-present
- Publisher: Wiley
- Frequency: rolling publication
- Impact factor: 7.9 (2024)

Standard abbreviations
- ISO 4: Ecol. Lett.

Indexing
- CODEN: ECLEFU
- ISSN: 1461-023X (print); 1461-0248 (web)
- LCCN: sn98015378
- OCLC no.: 40121970

Links
- Journal homepage; Online access; Online archive

Ecology Letters is a monthly peer-reviewed scientific journal published by Wiley and the French National Centre for Scientific Research. Peter H. Thrall is the current editor-in-chief, taking over from Tim Coulson (University of Oxford). The journal covers research on all aspects of ecology.

== Abstracting and indexing ==
Ecology Letters is abstracted and indexed in Academic Search/Academic Search Premier, AGRICOLA, Aquatic Sciences and Fisheries Abstracts, Biological Abstracts, BIOSIS and BIOSIS Previews, CAB Abstracts, CAB Health/CABDirect, Cambridge Scientific Abstracts databases, Current Contents/Agriculture, Biology & Environmental Sciences, GEOBASE, GeoRef, Index Medicus/MEDLINE, InfoTrac, PubMed, Science Citation Index, Scopus, and The Zoological Record.

According to the 2024 Journal Citation Reports, Ecology Letters is ranked seventh out of one hundred and seventy-three (7/200) journals in the category "Ecology," with a 2024 impact factor of 7,9.
