= Journal of Negative Results in Biomedicine =

- Discipline: Biomedicine
- Language: English

Publication details
- History: 2002-2017
- Publisher: BioMed Central
- Open access: Yes
- License: CC-BY 4.0

Standard abbreviations
- ISO 4: J. Negat. Results Biomed.

Indexing
- ISSN: 1477-5751
- LCCN: 2003252111
- OCLC no.: 969760460

Links
- Journal homepage; Online archive

The Journal of Negative Results in Biomedicine was a peer-reviewed open access medical journal. It published papers that promote a discussion of unexpected, controversial, provocative and/or negative results in the context of current research. The journal was established in 2002 and ceased publishing in September 2017. It was abstracted and indexed in the Emerging Sources Citation Index, Index Medicus/MEDLINE/PubMed, and Scopus.
