= Cell Reports =

- Language: English
- Edited by: Shawnna Buttery

Publication details
- History: 2012–present
- Publisher: Elsevier (United States)
- Frequency: Monthly
- Open access: Yes
- License: CC BY 4.0
- Impact factor: 6.9 (2024)

Standard abbreviations
- ISO 4: Cell Rep.

Indexing
- Cell Reports
- CODEN: CREED8
- ISSN: 2639-1856 (print); 2211-1247 (web)
- LCCN: 2018204071
- OCLC no.: 774710944
- Cell Reports Physical Science
- CODEN: CRPSF5
- ISSN: 2666-3864
- OCLC no.: 1131819624
- Cell Reports Medicine
- CODEN: CRMEDE
- ISSN: 2666-3791
- LCCN: 2020243188
- OCLC no.: 1131819524
- Cell Reports Methods
- CODEN: CRMECD
- ISSN: 2667-2375
- LCCN: 2021229737
- OCLC no.: 1258029084
- Cell Reports Sustainability
- ISSN: 2949-7906
- LCCN: 2024239321
- OCLC no.: 1411577695

Links
- Journal homepage

Cell Reports is a peer-reviewed scientific journal publishing research papers across a broad range of disciplines within the life sciences. The journal was established in 2012 and is the first open access journal published by Cell Press, an imprint of Elsevier.

== Abstracting and indexing ==
The journal is abstracted and indexed in MEDLINE/PubMed, Science Citation Index Expanded, and Scopus.

The journal has a 2024 impact factor of 6.7.

== Subjournals ==
Cell Reports has other sister journals under the name of Cell Reports Medicine, Cell Reports Methods, Cell Reports Physical Science, and Cell Reports Sustainability.
