= Cell Metabolism =

- Discipline: Physiology
- Language: English
- Edited by: Salvatore Fabbiano

Publication details
- History: 2005–present
- Publisher: Cell Press
- Frequency: Monthly
- Open access: Delayed, after 12 months
- Impact factor: 37.0 (2025)

Standard abbreviations
- ISO 4: Cell Metab.

Indexing
- ISSN: 1550-4131

Links
- Journal homepage

Cell Metabolism is a monthly peer-reviewed scientific journal covering physiology, with an emphasis on understanding the molecular basis of how the body self-regulates in the face of change, and how disturbances in these balances can lead to disease. The journal was established in 2005 and is published by Cell Press. The editor-in-chief is Salvatore Fabbiano.

According to the Journal Citation Reports, the journal has a 2025 impact factor of 37.0, ranking 6th of 207 journals in the Cell Biology category.
