= Cell Press =

Science journal imprint

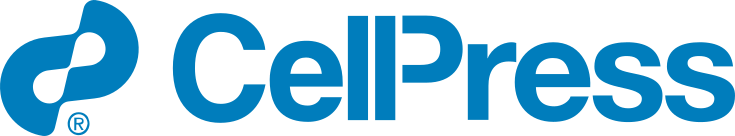
- Founded: 1986; 40 years ago
- Founder: Benjamin Lewin
- Country of origin: United States
- Headquarters location: Cambridge, Massachusetts, U.S.
- Key people: Anne Kitson (Senior vice president)
- Publication types: Scientific journals
- Official website: www.cell.com

Cell Press is an all-science publisher of over 50 scientific journals across the life, physical, earth, and health sciences, both independently and in partnership with scientific societies. Cell Press was founded and is currently based in Cambridge, MA, and has offices across the United States, Europe, and Asia under its parent company Elsevier.

== History ==
Benjamin Lewin founded Cell. He then bought the title and established an independent Cell Press in 1986. The company spun off new journals as follows: Neuron in March 1988; Immunity in April 1994; and Molecular Cell in December 1997. Benjamin Lewin left in October 1999, after having sold Cell Press to Elsevier the previous April.

Since that time, Cell Press has launched a number of new titles: Developmental Cell in July 2001; Cancer Cell in February 2002; Cell Metabolism in January 2005; Cell Host & Microbe in March 2007; Cell Stem Cell in July 2007; Cell Systems in July 2015; Heliyon 2015; Chem in July 2016; Joule in September 2017; iScience in March 2018; and One Earth in September 2019. Cell Genomics was added in 2021.

Meanwhile, three additional Elsevier journals have joined the Cell Press group: Current Biology launched in January 1996, which became part of Cell Press in early 2001; Structure launched in 1993, which merged with the journal Folding & Design in early 1999. At that point, the name changed to Structure with Folding & Design but reverted to Structure at the beginning of 2001, when the journal joined Cell Press. Cell Chemical Biology (formerly titled Chemistry & Biology) launched on April 15, 1994, and joined Cell Press in January 2002. In 2007, Cell Press acquired the Trends family of journals, 16 review journals covering the life, physical, and medical sciences.

In October 1995, Cell.com was launched and full-text online versions were launched in July 1997.

== Open access ==
Cell Press published its first open access journal, Cell Reports, in 2012. In January 2021, all Cell Press journals began offering open access publishing options. As of May 2022, Cell Press publishes 17 open access journals and 40 hybrid journals. In 2021, 50% of all articles published in Cell Press were open access.

== Other initiatives ==
In 2016 Cell Press launched STAR Methods. STAR (Structured Transparent Accessible Reporting) Methods is focused on making replicable research methods available.

In 2020, Cell Press launched the Rising Black Scientist Awards. Winning essays are published in Cell, and winners receive a $10,000 award. The 2021 winners were Charleese Williams and Elle Lett. The 2020 winners were Olufolakemi Olusanya and Chrystal Starbird.

== Journals published ==
=== Research journals ===
- Cell
- Cancer Cell
- Cell Chemical Biology
- Cell Genomics
- Cell Host & Microbe
- Cell Metabolism
- Cell Reports
- Cell Reports Medicine
- Cell Reports Methods
- Cell Reports Physical Science
- Cell Stem Cell
- Cell Systems
- Chem
- Chem Catalysis
- Current Biology
- Device
- Developmental Cell
- Heliyon
- Immunity
- iScience
- Joule
- Matter
- Med
- Molecular Cell
- Neuron
- One Earth
- Patterns
- STAR Protocols
- Structure

=== Trends reviews journals ===
- Trends in Biochemical Sciences
- Trends in Biotechnology
- Trends in Cancer
- Trends in Cell Biology
- Trends in Chemistry
- Trends in Cognitive Sciences
- Trends in Ecology & Evolution
- Trends in Endocrinology & Metabolism
- Trends in Genetics
- Trends in Immunology
- Trends in Microbiology
- Trends in Molecular Medicine
- Trends in Neurosciences
- Trends in Parasitology
- Trends in Pharmacological Sciences
- Trends in Plant Science

=== Partner journals ===
- American Journal of Human Genetics
- Biophysical Journal
- Biophysical Reports
- EBioMedicine
- Human Genetics and Genomics Advances
- Molecular Plant
- Molecular Therapy family
- Plant Communications
- Stem Cell Reports
- The Innovation

== See also ==
- Journals published by Cell Press
