= Molecular Cell =

- Discipline: Cell biology, molecular biology
- Language: English

Publication details
- History: 1997–present
- Publisher: Cell Press
- Frequency: Biweekly
- Impact factor: 16.0 (2025)

Standard abbreviations
- ISO 4: Mol. Cell

Indexing
- ISSN: 1097-2765
- OCLC no.: 38065664

Links
- Journal homepage

Molecular Cell is a peer-reviewed scientific journal that covers research on cell biology at the molecular level, with an emphasis on new mechanistic insights. It was established in 1997 and is published two times per month. The journal is published by Cell Press and is a companion to Cell.

== Abstracting and indexing ==
The journal is abstracted and indexed, for example, in:

- Scopus
- PubMed
- EBSCO databases
- ProQuest
- Science Citation Index Expanded

According to the Journal Citation Reports, the journal had an impact factor of 16.0 in 2025.
