= Gut Microbes =

Microbiology journal

- Discipline: Microbiology
- Language: English
- Edited by: Beth McCormick

Publication details
- History: 2010–present
- Publisher: Taylor & Francis
- Frequency: Continuous
- Open access: Yes
- Impact factor: 15.3 (2025)

Standard abbreviations
- ISO 4: Gut Microbes

Indexing
- CODEN: GMUIA4
- ISSN: 1949-0976 (print); 1949-0984 (web)
- LCCN: 2009203205
- OCLC no.: 401346876

Links
- Journal homepage; Online access; Online archive

Gut Microbes is a peer-reviewed, open access scientific journal covering research on all aspects of the microorganisms inhabiting the intestines, including their broader effects on the physiology of human and model organism hosts. The journal publishes basic, translational, and clinical research. It was established in 2010 and is published by Taylor & Francis. The journal became fully open access in 2020. Its editor-in-chief is Beth McCormick (UMass Chan Medical School).

== Article types ==
The journal publishes the following article types:

- Brief Reports
- Commentaries and Views
- Creative Commentaries
- Data Notes
- Editorials
- Meeting Reports
- Research Letters
- Research Papers/Reports
- Reviews

== Abstracting and indexing ==
The journal is abstracted and indexed in:

- Biological Abstracts
- BIOSIS Previews
- Directory of Open Access Journals
- Embase
- Index Medicus/MEDLINE/PubMed
- Science Citation Index Expanded
- Scopus

According to the Journal Citation Reports, the journal has a 2025 impact factor of 15.3.

== See also ==
- Microbiome
- Gut microbiota
- Gastroenterology
