= Cell (journal) =

Scientific journal

- Cover of December 2009 issue
- Discipline: Biology
- Language: English
- Edited by: John Pham

Publication details
- History: 1974–present
- Publisher: Cell Press
- Frequency: Biweekly
- Open access: After 12 months
- Impact factor: 45.5 (2023)

Standard abbreviations
- ISO 4: Cell

Indexing
- CODEN: CELLB5
- ISSN: 0092-8674 (print); 1097-4172 (web)
- LCCN: 74641498
- OCLC no.: 01792038

Links
- Journal homepage; Online access; Online archive; Journal page on Elsevier website

Cell is a for profit peer-reviewed scientific journal publishing research papers across a broad range of disciplines within the life sciences. Areas covered include molecular biology, cell biology, systems biology, stem cells, developmental biology, genetics and genomics, proteomics, cancer research, immunology, neuroscience, structural biology, microbiology, virology, physiology, biophysics, and computational biology. The journal was established in 1974 by Benjamin Lewin and is published twice monthly by Cell Press, owned by Elsevier.

== History ==
Benjamin Lewin founded Cell in January 1974, under the aegis of MIT Press. He then bought the title and established an independent Cell Press in 1986. In April 1999, Lewin sold Cell Press to Elsevier.

The "Article of the Future" feature was the recipient of a 2011 PROSE Award for Excellence in Biological & Life Sciences presented by the Professional and Scholarly Publishing Division of the Association of American Publishers.

== Impact factor ==
According to ScienceWatch, the journal was ranked first overall in the category of highest-impact journals (all fields) over 1995–2005 with an average of 161.2 citations per paper. According to the Journal Citation Reports, the journal has a 2020 impact factor of 41.582, ranking it first out of 298 journals in "Biochemistry & Molecular Biology".

== Contents and features ==
In addition to original research articles, 'another section publishes previews, reviews, analytical articles, commentaries, essays, correspondence, current nomenclature lists, glossaries, and schematic diagrams of cellular processes. Features include "PaperClips" (short conversations between a Cell editor and an author exploring the rationale and implications of research findings) and "PaperFlicks" (video summaries of a Cell paper).

== Availability ==
Content over 12 months old is freely accessible, starting from the January 1995 issue.

== Editors ==
- John Pham (2018–present)
- Emilie Marcus (2003–2017)
- Vivian Siegel (1999–2003)
- Benjamin Lewin (1974–1999)

== See also ==
- The Hallmarks of Cancer
