= Delayed open-access journal =

Type of scientific journal

Delayed open-access journals are traditional subscription-based journals that provide free online access upon the expiry of an embargo period following the initial publication date.

== Details ==
The embargo period before an article is made available for free can vary from a few months to two or more years. In a 2013 study, 77.8% of delayed open access journals analyzed had an embargo of 12 months or less. 85.4% had an embargo period of 24 months or less. A journal subscription or an individual article purchase fee would be required to access the materials before this embargo period ends. Some delayed access journals also deposit their publications in open repositories when the author is bound by a delayed open-access mandate.

The rationale for the access delay is to provide eventual access to all would-be users while still requiring the institutions of researchers who need immediate access to keep paying the subscriptions that cover the costs of publication. The marginal costs of distributing an electronic journal to additional users are trivial in comparison to distributing printed copies of the publication. Delayed access publishers spend little or no additional funds while marketing their publications to a broader population than those with personal subscriptions or those affiliated with institutions that have institutional subscriptions or other forms of institutional access.

The assumptions underlying delayed access are that (1) active researchers have sufficient access through institutional subscriptions or licenses, that (2) researchers at institutions that cannot afford subscription access to a journal can use interlibrary loan or direct purchases to access the articles they need, and that (3) students and others affiliated with institutions that cannot afford subscription access to a given journal do not generally need to access articles as urgently as researchers do. It is not clear whether these assumptions are valid.

As a remedy for the fact that in the online era immediate access to research continues to be denied to those who need it most—i.e., researchers—if their institutions cannot afford to pay for it, researchers do have the option of providing open access to their own published research immediately, by self-archiving it in their institutional repositories. A growing number of research institutions and research funders worldwide are now beginning to adopt open-access mandates to ensure that their researchers self-archive.

== Adoption ==
Many scholarly society journals have adopted the delayed access model. A 2013 study looked at more than 110,000 articles from 492 journals with delayed open access and found the impact factor of articles in delayed open access journals was twice as high as traditional closed access journals (and three times as high as gold open access journals).

Delayed access does increase access to scholarly research literature for many, but subscribing institutions continue to pay for immediate access during the embargo period. The wide range in embargo lengths – and the fact that open access is both defined and intended as the state of immediate access – limits the meaningfulness of classifying journals as "delayed open-access" journals. For example, Molecular Biology of the Cell has a one-month embargo, whereas Journal of the Physical Society of Japan has a 6-year embargo period. Hence delayed access journals are not included in the lists of open-access journals, such as the Directory of Open Access Journals (DOAJ). In January 2017, the Journal of Experimental Medicine announced that it will now be charging Article Processing Charges for delayed open access.

== See also ==
- Hybrid open-access journal
- List of open-access journals
- Open access
- Self-archiving
