= Robert S. Taubman =

American businessman

- Born: December 27, 1953 (age 72); Detroit, Michigan, U.S.
- Education: Boston University (B.S.)
- Occupation: Businessman
- Spouses: Caroline Summers (m. 2023); Julia Reyes Taubman (m. 1999–2018, her death)
- Children: 4
- Parents: A. Alfred Taubman; Reva Kolodney
- Family: J. Christopher Reyes, brother-in-law; Jude Reyes, brother-in-law

Robert S. Taubman (born December 27, 1953) is an American businessman. He is the chairman and chief executive officer of Taubman Realty Group.

== Early life and education ==
Taubman was born to a Jewish family, the son of Reva (née Kolodney) and A. Alfred Taubman (1924–2015). His father founded Taubman Centers, headquartered in Bloomfield Hills, Michigan. He received a Bachelor of Science in Economics from Boston University.

== Career ==
He joined his family business, Taubman Centers, in 1976. He became executive vice president in 1984, chief operating officer in 1988, president and chief executive officer in 1990, and chairman in 2001.

Taubman is on the executive board of the National Association of Real Estate Investment Trusts (NAREIT) and is a member and immediate past chairman of the Real Estate Roundtable in Washington, D.C. He is a member and past trustee of the Urban Land Institute (ULI) and founding chairman of ULI’s Detroit Regional District Council. He also is a member and past trustee of the International Council of Shopping Centers (ICSC). Taubman is a member of the board of directors of Comerica Incorporated (NYSE:CMA) and is a past board member of Sotheby’s Holdings, Inc. (NYSE:BID).

Among his many civic and charitable commitments, Taubman is on the executive committee of Southeastern Michigan Council of Governments (SEMCOG) and is as a member of the board of directors of Business Leaders for Michigan. He is a trustee of the Cranbrook Educational Community, where he is chairman of the audit committee. He is on the University of Michigan Investment Advisory Committee, and is the advisory board chair of the Taubman Center for State and Local Government and a council member of the Belfer Center for Science and International Affairs, both at the Harvard Kennedy School. Taubman holds a B.S. degree in economics from Boston University.

== Personal life ==
Robert married Caroline Summers of Dallas, TX, on May 21, 2023. Prior, he was married to the late author and Museum of Contemporary Art Detroit founder Julia Reyes (of the Reyes Holdings family). He has four children: Alexander, Ghislaine, Theodore and Sebastian Taubman. Caroline has two grown children from a previous marriage: William and Genevieve Minnis.
