= List of Gulfstream G550 operators =

Gulfstream G550 government and military operators

This is a list of notable operators for the Gulfstream G550, an executive transport jet used by multiple governments, individuals, and companies.

== Government operators ==
Algeria

- Algerian Air Force – 3 G550s

Australia

- In late 2015, the RAAF ordered two Gulfstream G550 aircraft to be delivered by 30 November 2017. The aircraft will be used for SIGINT and ELINT intelligence gathering. It is reported that the aircraft will possibly form the replacement for the electronic intelligence-gathering role performed by two of the RAAF's AP-3 Orions. In June 2017, the sale was approved, and the United States confirmed that Australia was interested in purchasing up to five airframes, to be delivered in two tranches from the early 2020s. In March 2019, the Minister for Defence announced the procurement of four modified Gulfstream G550 aircraft for use in electronic warfare missions. The aircraft, to be designated MC-55A Peregrine in Australian service, are to be modified in the U.S. and delivered to RAAF Base Edinburgh in a deal worth A$2.46 billion.
- One MC-55A Peregrine is in service as of January 2026.

Bahrain

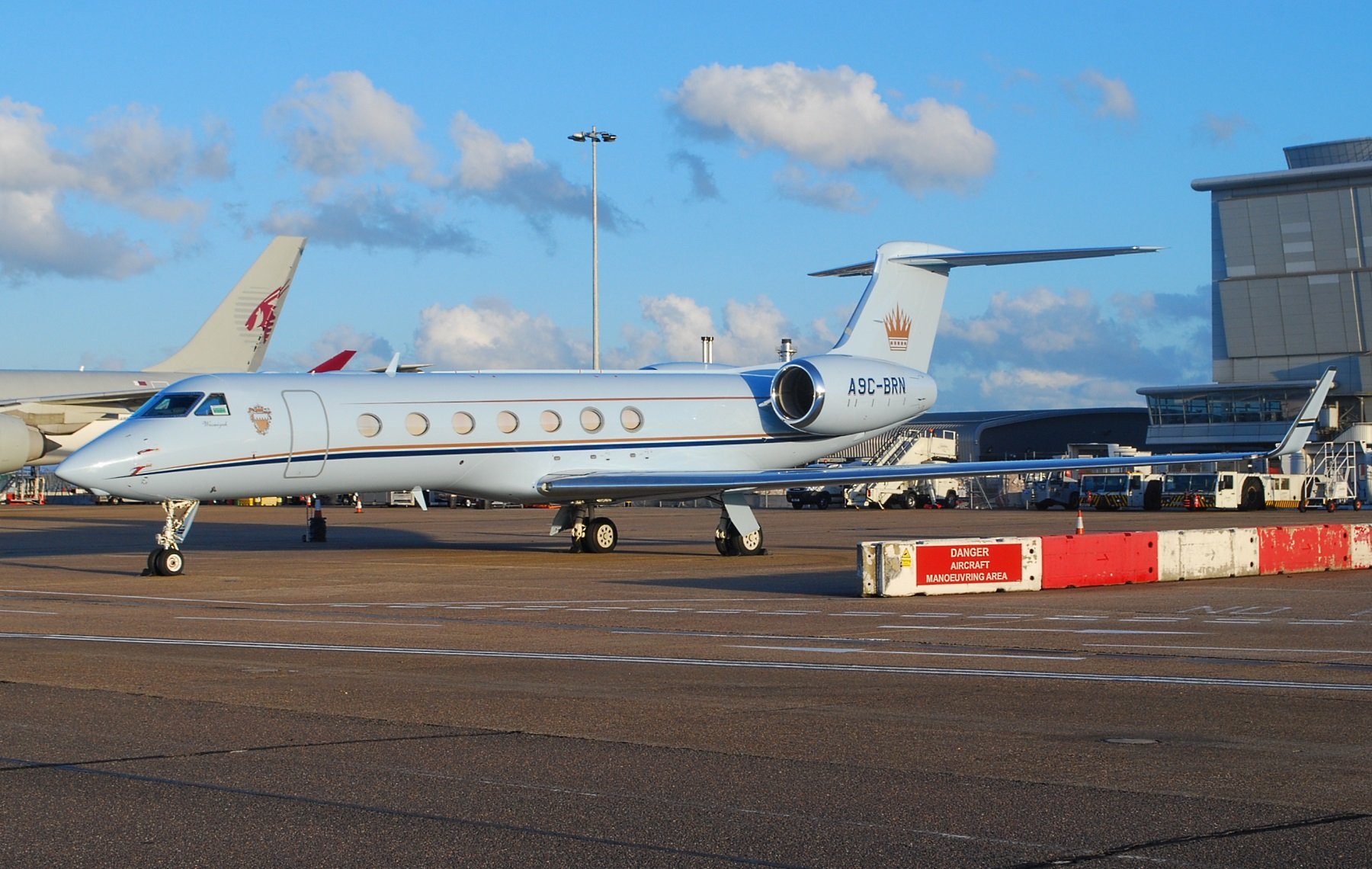
A Bahraini G550 at Heathrow Airport

- The Kingdom of Bahrain is known to use a Gulfstream G550 as a state aircraft and for transporting its royal family.

Oman

- Royal Flight of Oman operated 2 Gulfstream G550s for the Government of Oman to use to for the president and V.I.P.

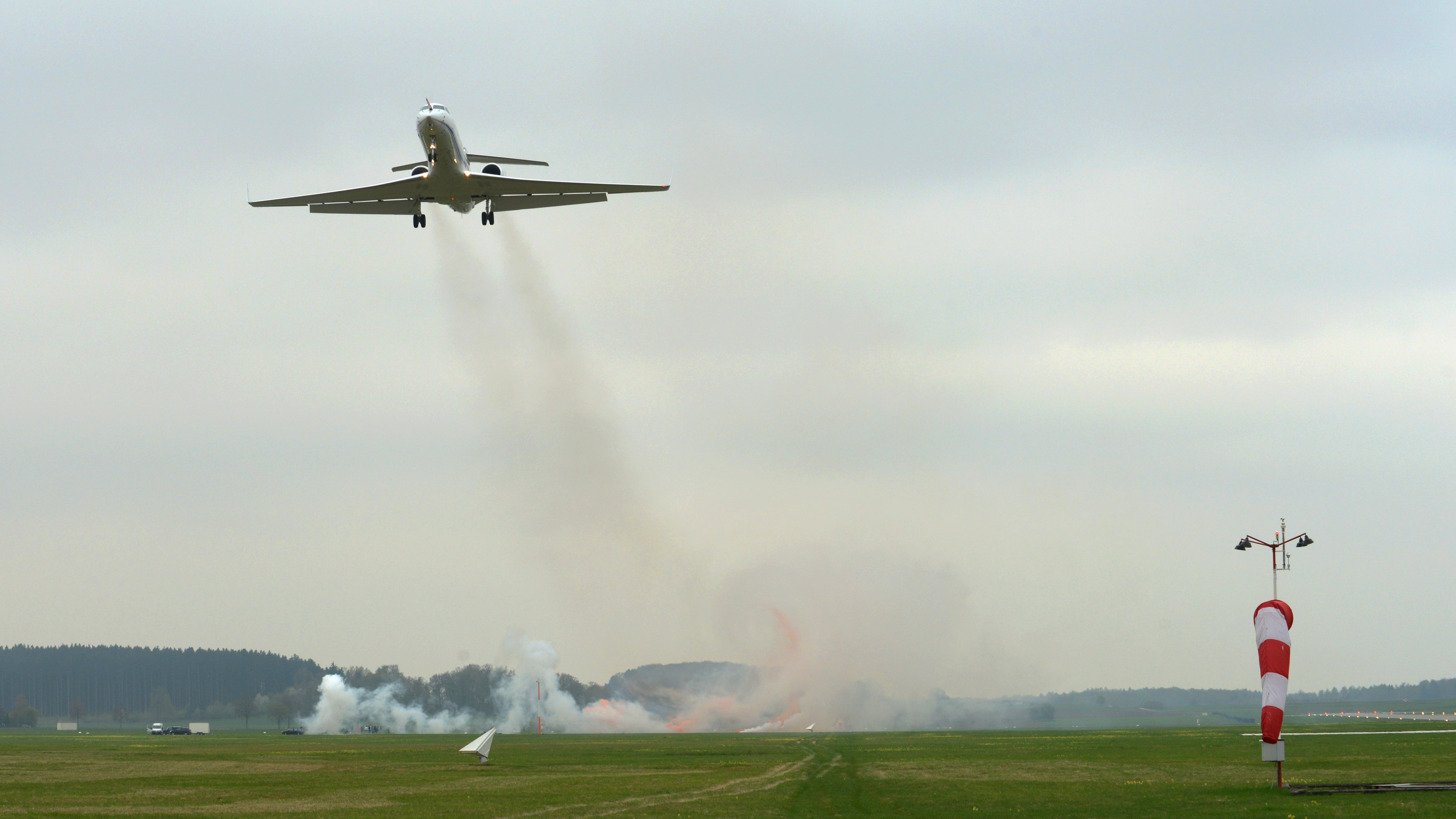
HALO flies over smoke creating wake vortices

Germany

- German Aerospace Center (DLR) – one G550 special mission aircraft. The aircraft is dubbed HALO (High Altitude and Long Range Research Aircraft). The aircraft's primary objective is to explore the atmosphere and its carbon cycle. Its unique configuration allows a flying altitude of more than 15 kilometers (49,500 feet), a range of more than 8,000 kilometers, and a load capacity of three tons.

Israel

- Israeli Air Force – two Eitam CAEW (Conformal Airborne Early Warning) and Three Shavit SEMA (Special Electronic Missions Aircraft) aircraft

Italy

- Italian Air Force – two G550 CAEWs as part of a counter-deal to Israel's $1 billion order for 30 Alenia Aermacchi M-346 advanced jet trainers. Both aircraft delivered and in service as of January 2018. In December 2020 Italy decided to buy additional 8 G550; the first two will be equipped for AISREW (Airborne Intelligence, Surveillance, Reconnaissance, and Electronic Warfare) mission with a L3Harris suite and the remaining six would be delivered as "green" aircraft to be fitted with mission systems at a later date.

Kuwait

- State of Kuwait – one Gulfstream G550 in service for transport of the royal family.

Nigeria

- Nigerian Air Force – one G550 in service

Poland

- Polish Air Force – two G550s in use for VIP transport

Singapore

- Republic of Singapore Air Force (RSAF) – four G550s with the IAI/ELTA EL/W-2085 active electronically scanned array (AESA) active phased array radar for CAEW duties from Israel Aerospace Industries (IAI). These were delivered in late 2008 and were expected to be fully operational by late 2010. An additional G550 for use as an AEW trainer was to be acquired and maintained by ST Aerospace for the RSAF.

Sweden

- Swedish Air Force – one G550, designated TP 102D It along with a G-IV designated TP 102A, and a G-IV SP, designated TP 102C, serve as transports for the royal family and the prime minister.

Tanzania

- Tanzania Government Flight Agency – one G550 in service for VIP transport

Turkey

- Turkish Armed Forces – two G550 Command and Control aircraft in use

Uganda

- Government of Uganda – one G550 in use for presidential flights since February 2009. It replaced a Gulfstream IV-SP that had been in service since 2000.

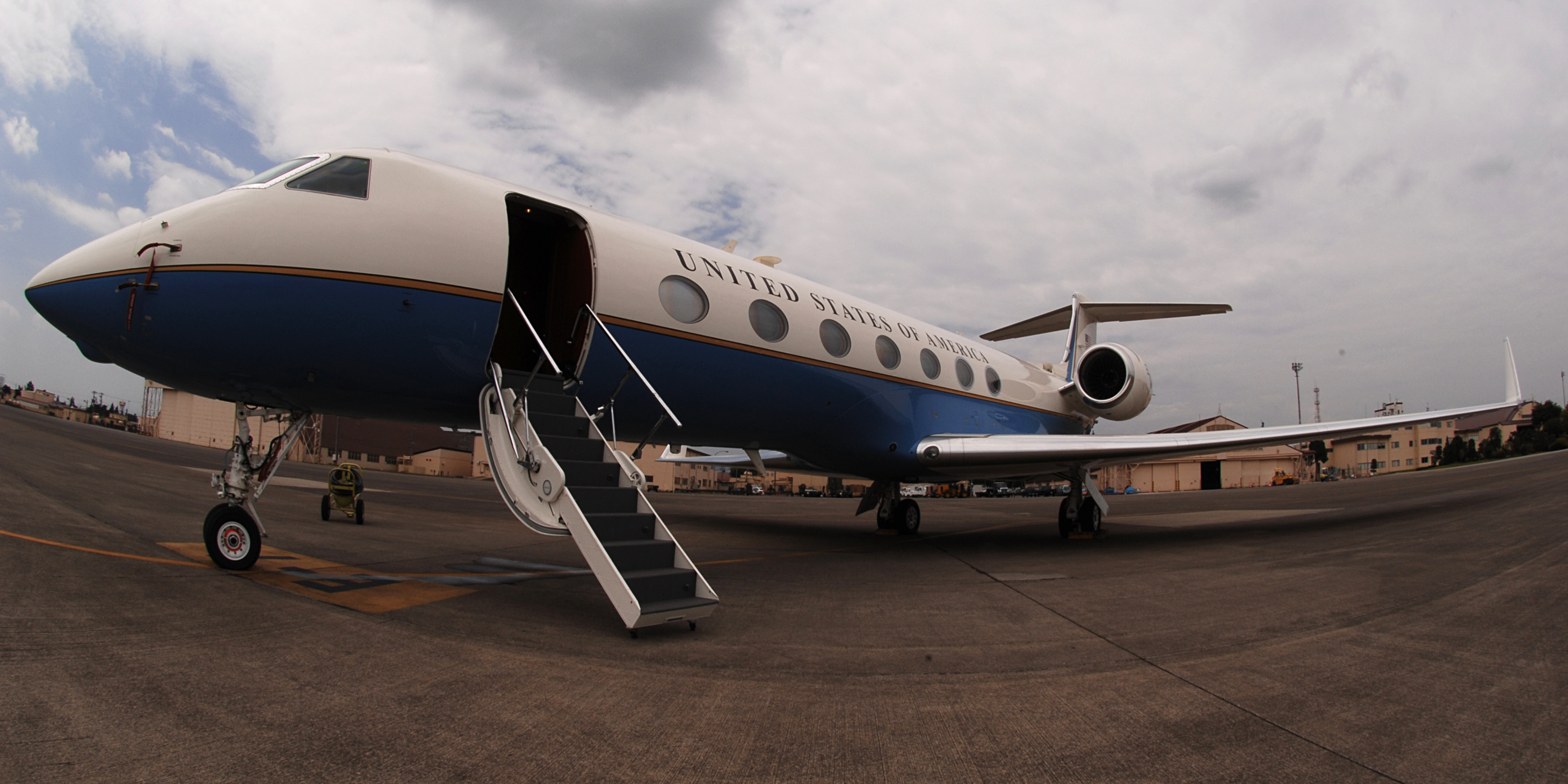
A USAF C-37B at Yokota Air Base, Japan

United States

- United States Air Force – one specially equipped C-37B used as VIP transport including the President
- United States Navy – three C-37Bs in service as VIP transports
- United States Army – one C-37B in use since 2005 as VIP transport.
- United States Coast Guard – one C-37B in service as a Long Range Command and Control Aircraft.

== Individual operators ==
Various companies are known to own and operate G550s, among the most well-covered being those acquired by Elon Musk in 2020 and 2021. Musk's two most recently purchased G550s were formerly owned by Wells Fargo and Contrail Aviation LLC.

The following individuals have been reported to own G550s at some point:

- Bill Ackman
- Sergey Brin
- Jim Crane
- Mark Cuban
- Jeffrey Epstein
- Dan Friedkin
- Alexander Lukashenko
- Leonid Mikhelson
- Muhammad bin Fahd Al Saud
- Rupert Murdoch
- Elon Musk
- Larry Page
- Adar Poonawalla
- J. Christopher Reyes
- Rick Ross
- Eric Schmidt
- Alan Smolinisky
- Oprah Winfrey
- Tiger Woods

== Corporate operators ==
The following companies have been reported to own G550s at some point:

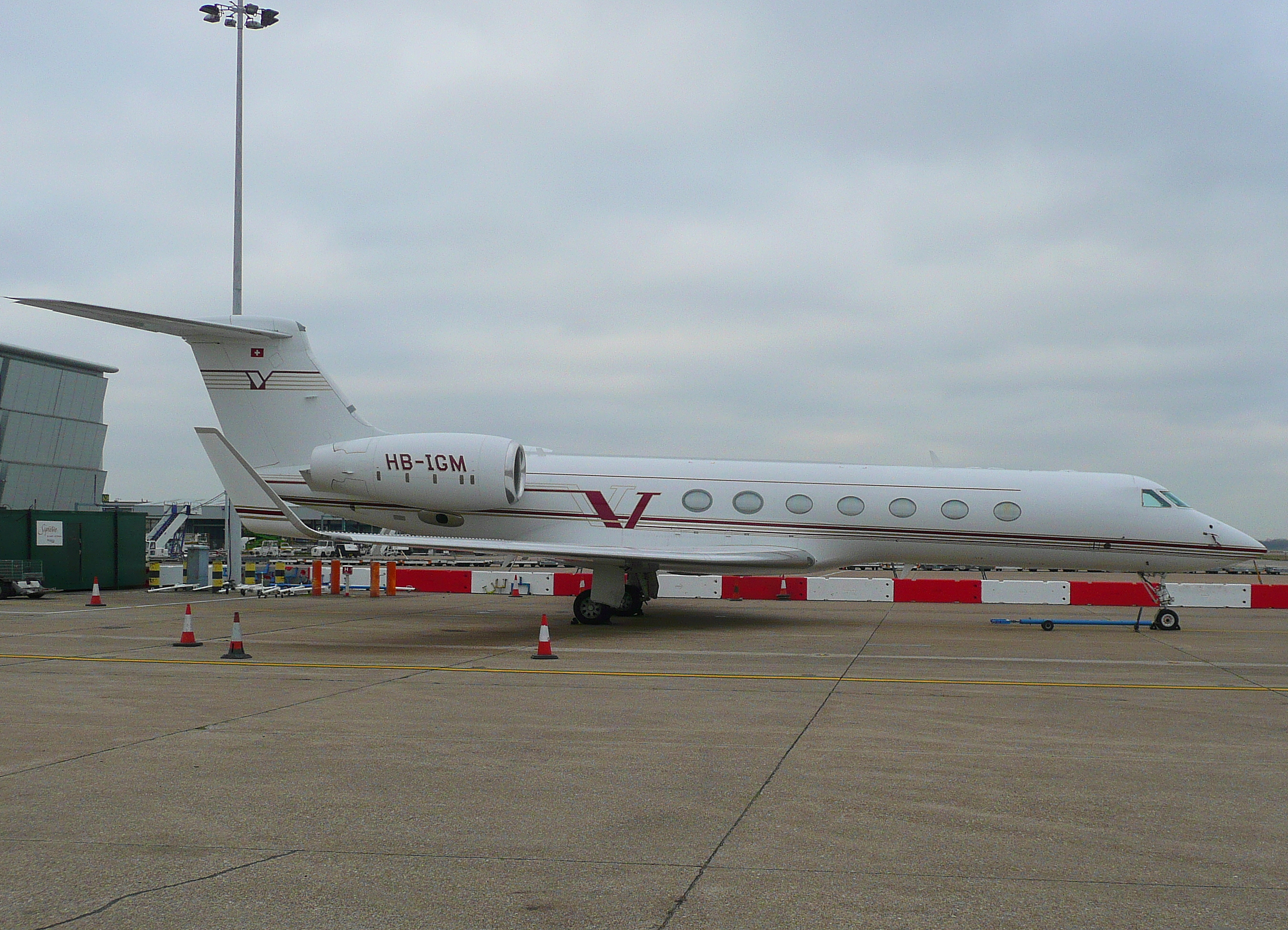
A G550 operated by Credit Suisse

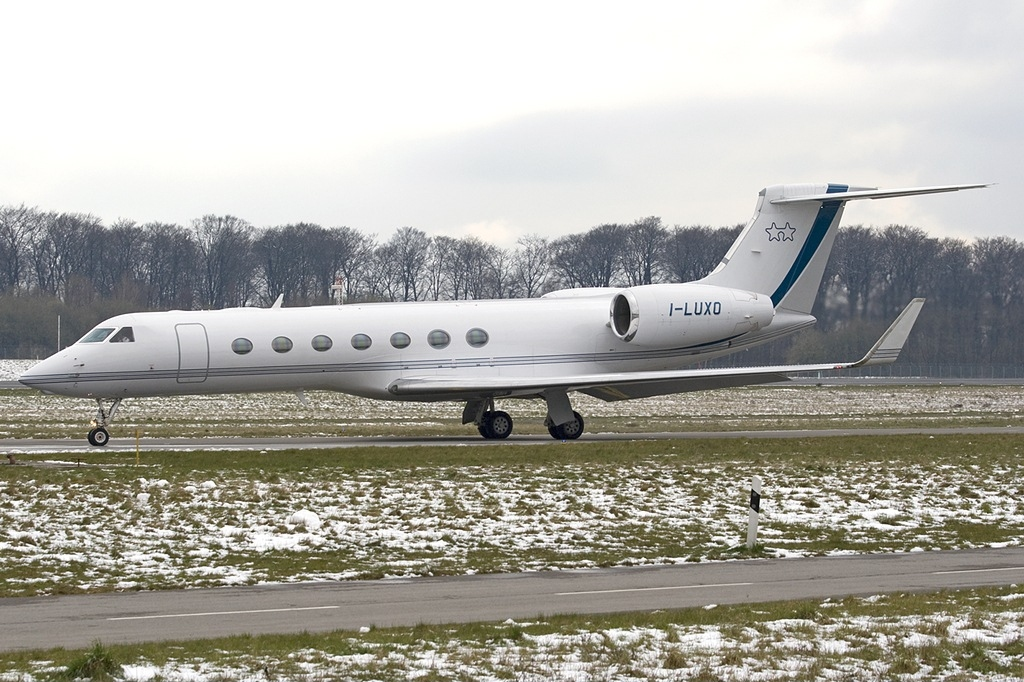
A G550 owned by Luxottica

- 21st Century Fox
- 3M
- Abbott Laboratories
- Alcoa
- American Express
- Amgen
- Aramco
- AT&T
- Bank of America
- BMW
- Calvin Klein
- Chevron Corporation
- ConocoPhillips
- Coca-Cola
- Costco
- Credit Suisse
- Dell
- Disney
- Dow Chemical Company
- DuPont
- eBay
- Emigrant Bank
- EssilorLuxottica
- ExxonMobil
- Fidelity Investments
- FIS
- Fifth Third Bank
- Ford Motor Company
- General Dynamics
- General Motors
- Google
- Heinz
- Hermès
- Hewlett-Packard
- Honeywell
- IBM
- Johnson & Johnson
- JPMorgan Chase
- Kraft Foods
- Las Vegas Sands
- LG Corporation
- Liberty Mutual
- Mandalay Resort Group
- Marathon Oil
- McDonald's
- Monsanto
- Motorola
- Netflix, Inc.
- Nike, Inc.
- Nissan
- Panda Express
- PayPal
- Penske Corporation
- Pfizer
- Philadelphia Eagles
- Philip Morris International
- Phillips 66
- PPG Industries
- Procter & Gamble
- Raytheon
- Revlon
- RH
- Seminole Tribe of Florida (Hard Rock Cafe)
- Simon Property Group
- Solaris Bus & Coach
- SpaceX
- Starbucks
- Target Corporation
- Tesco
- UnitedHealth Group
- U.S. Bancorp
- U.S. Steel
- Valero Energy
- Verizon Communications
- Visa Inc.
- Wachovia
- Waffle House
- WarnerMedia
- Wells Fargo
- Westfield Group
- Whirlpool Corporation
- Wynn Resorts
- Xerox
- Yum! Brands
