= Eva Feldman =

American neurologist

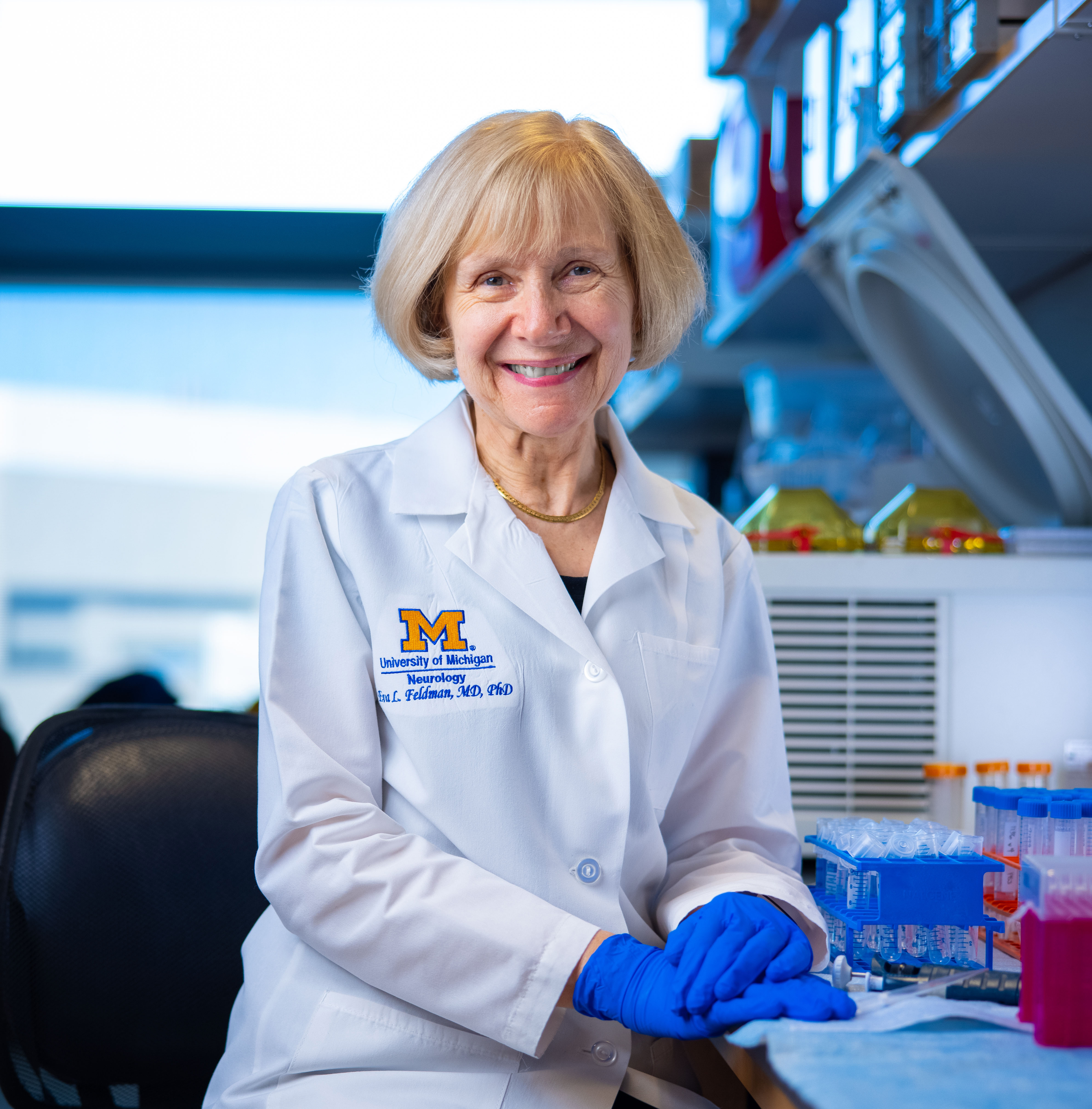
- Feldman in 2022
- Occupation: Physician-scientist

Eva Lucille Feldman, M.D., Ph.D., is an American physician-scientist known for her work in the field of neurodegenerative diseases. She serves as the James W. Albers Distinguished University Professor of Neurology at the University of Michigan, as well as the Russell N. DeJong Professor of Neurology, Professor of Neurosurgery, and director of the NeuroNetwork for Emerging Therapies and ALS Center of Excellence at Michigan Medicine.

Feldman has made contributions to research and clinical care in neurodegenerative diseases. Her primary focus has been on amyotrophic lateral sclerosis (ALS), Alzheimer's disease, cognitive decline, the neurologic complications of diabetes and obesity, as well as how environmental toxins affect the nervous system. She has conducted research on developing stem cell therapies for the treatment of neurodegenerative diseases.

Feldman is on the National Research Council, the operating arm of the National Academies of Science, Engineering and Medicine and the National Academy of Medicine (governing and oversight) Council. She is also a member of the Association of American Physicians and is a Fellow of the American Association for the Advancement of Science.

== Early life and education ==
Feldman grew up in Indiana and completed her undergraduate degree in biology and chemistry at Earlham College with honors, followed by an M.S. in zoology at the University Notre Dame. She received her M.D. and Ph.D. at the University of Michigan. She was a Rackham Scholar at Michigan. She completed her Neurology residency at Johns Hopkins, where she served as Chief Resident and received the Johns Hopkins Award for Medical Teaching and Excellence. She was the first neurologist to receive this award at Hopkins. Feldman then returned to the University of Michigan to complete a neuromuscular disorders fellowship with longtime mentor Dr. James Albers.

== Career ==
In 1988, Feldman became an assistant professor and opened a laboratory in the Department of Neurology at Michigan Medicine, serving as member of the Neuroscience Program and the Michigan Diabetes Research and Training Center. In 1994, she became an associate professor, and in 1998 she joined the faculty of the Cellular and Molecular Biology Program.

In 2000, Feldman became the director of the Juvenile Diabetes Research Foundation Center for the Study of Complications in Diabetes (until 2010), Director of the ALS Center of Excellence at Michigan Medicine, and a fully endowed professor, the Russell N. DeJong Professor of Neurology. In 2005, she was named the Director of Michigan Medicine's Neuropathy Center. She was appointed the inaugural Director of the A. Alfred Taubman Medical Research Institute in 2007, after U-M received a multimillion-dollar gift from A. Alfred Taubman for its creation.

In 2023, she was also given the University of Michigan's most prestigious honor, a Distinguished University Professorship, which was named after her longtime mentor James Albers, M.D., Ph.D. In 2024, she was named to the faculty of the Department of Neurosurgery at Michigan Medicine.

She is a principal investigator or co-Investigator of grants funded by the NIH, including the NIH Director's Transformative Research Award in 2021, as well as grants from the Centers for Disease Control and Prevention's Agency for Toxic Substances and Disease Registry, the Juvenile Diabetes Research Foundation, and private foundations. Feldman also leads multiple clinical trials focused on understanding and treating neurological disorders, with an emphasis on ALS and neuropathy.

Feldman served as President of the Peripheral Nerve Society from 2007 to 2009. She was also the President of the American Neurological Association (ANA) from 2011 to 2013, being only the third woman elected as ANA President in 130 years. She went on to become the chair of the ANA from 2021–2015. She was the first woman in 25 years to receive the Robert S. Schwab Award from the American Clinical Neurophysiology Society. She is also the only U-M alumnus to receive both Early and Distinguished Career Achievement Awards from the U-M Medical Alumni Society. Among her many honors, Feldman is an elected member of the National Academy of Medicine (NAM) and Association of American Physicians, and a Fellow of the American Association for the Advancement of Science. In 2023, she was appointed to the NAM (governing and oversight) Council and received the Fulton Award from the World Federation of Neurology. In 2024, Feldman was awarded the Sheila Essey Award for her work in ALS from the American Academy of Neurology, American Brain Foundation, and ALS Association. Also that year, she was part of a special National Academies of Sciences, Engineering and Medicine committee that published "Living With ALS," which set priorities and recommendations to make ALS a livable disease. In 2025, Feldman received the Award for Distinguished Research in the Biomedical Sciences from the Association of American medical Colleges. Other awards include the Juvenile Diabetes Research Foundation Mary Jane Kugel Award twice (2003 and 2005), the American Diabetes Association Lifetime Achievement Award (2006), the Endocrine Society Gerald D. Aurbach Award for Outstanding Translational Research (2017), and the Peripheral Nerve Society Alan J. Gebhart Prize for Excellence in Peripheral Nerve Research (2019). Feldman is the Editor of the Contemporary Neurology Series and also serves on a number of editorial boards for leading scientific journals, including The Lancet Neurology, Nature Reviews Neurology, JAMA Neurology, and Journal of Neurology, Neurosurgery and Psychiatry. She has also been featured on numerous media outlets, including CNN, TIME, National Geographic, PBS, and The New York Times, among many more.

=== A. Alfred Taubman Medical Research Institute ===
In 2008, the A. Alfred Taubman Medical Research Institute was founded to support the research of physician-scientists, with the goal of empowering medical scientists to expand the boundaries of scientific discovery, develop new medical therapies, and alleviate human suffering caused by diseases. Under Feldman's leadership, the Taubman Institute funded senior-level physician-scientists in a broad spectrum of diseases but with special attention on adult and childhood cancer, cardiovascular and metabolic diseases, and neurological conditions such as ALS, Alzheimer's disease and the diabetic neuropathy. The Institute's funding focused on supporting "translational" research; the kind that transforms laboratory discoveries into treatments for patients.

Feldman also established an Emerging Scholars program to support promising early-career physician scientists at the Taubman Institute. This has provided unencumbered seed funding to over 20 junior investigators, with an emphasis on improving the diversity of the clinician-scientist workforce.

Feldman served as Director of the Taubman Institute for 10 years.

==== Stem cell initiative ====
Feldman has been an advocate for medical science, frequently appearing in public and media to discuss related issues. Feldman and the Taubman Institute played a role in the 2008 election when Michigan voters passed a constitutional amendment easing restrictions on embryonic stem cell research. Appearing on numerous television and radio programs, in newspaper articles and public speaking engagements, she spoke on the value of such research in the understanding and treatment of diseases.

In the following year, Feldman announced the formation of the Consortium of Stem Cell Therapies at the Taubman Institute, the first facility to produce embryonic stem cell lines in Michigan and one of only a handful in the nation.

==== Center for RNA Biomedicine at the University of Michigan ====
In the fall of 2015, under the leadership of Feldman, the Taubman Institute collaborated in the creation of the Center for RNA Biomedicine at the University of Michigan. It promotes and develops cross-disciplinary collaborations on RNA research across campus.

=== NeuroNetwork for Emerging Therapies ===
Feldman's scientific (basic science) laboratory was initially established in 1988 and was later named the Program for Neurology Research and Discovery. In the proceeding 20 years, her lab grew to over 30 scientists and was renamed The NeuroNetwork for Emerging Therapies (mneuronet.org) in 2020. The mission of Feldman's research remains the same: to advance scientific discovery and establish therapies for neurological diseases.

=== ALS Center of Excellence at Michigan Medicine ===
In 2023, Feldman was director of the ALS Clinic at Michigan Medicine, now known as the Pranger ALS Clinic. There, Feldman combined ALS patient care and ALS clinical and scientific research. The newly formed ALS Center of Excellence at Michigan Medicine was certified by the ALS Association. Patient care and clinical trials happen through Pranger ALS Clinic, while basic science research is conducted through the NeuroNetwork. All ALS-related activities at the separate entities are merged under the ALS Center of Excellence to build a true bench to bedside framework, now directed by Feldman, with Dr. Stephen Goutman, director of the Pranger ALS Clinic, serving as the associate director.

== Research ==
=== Amyotrophic lateral sclerosis (ALS) ===
Feldman's research on amyotrophic lateral sclerosis (ALS), more commonly known as Lou Gehrig's disease, has led to groundbreaking discoveries in disease mechanisms, risk factors, and potential treatments. She was instrumental in developing the first FDA-approved human clinical trial for a stem cell therapy for ALS. The Phase 1 and 2 trials demonstrated the safety and feasibility of transplanting up to 16 million stem cells into the spinal cord of individuals with ALS, laying the foundation for future cell-based treatments.

Feldman has also made national headlines for her work uncovering links between ALS risk and the exposome – the totality of environmental exposures across a person's lifetime – including pesticides, metals, air pollution, and residential and occupational exposures. Her work, supported by an NIH Director's Transformative Award she received in October 2021, integrates cutting-edge multi-omics approaches, including genomics, epigenomics, transcriptomics, and metabolomics, to better understand how environmental factors contribute to ALS. As part of this effort, her team is also developing polygenic and environmental risk scores to predict an individual's likelihood of developing ALS and how the disease may progress. These predictive models aim to enable earlier diagnosis and intervention, ultimately working towards the goal of making ALS a preventable disease. In a 2026 study, Feldman and colleagues found that long term exposure to air pollutants, including black carbons and nitrates, was associated with faster disease progression in individuals with ALS.

Her laboratory has also made considerable strides investigating the relationship between the immune system and ALS. In 2018, she and her team secured a method-of-use patent to repurpose Jakinibs, a family of Janus kinase inhibitors, for ALS treatment. This patent was based on her research identifying a novel immune-driven mechanism contributing to disease progression, offering a promising avenue for targeted therapies. Her laboratory is also analyzing immune cells in patients with ALS to develop immune profiles that help predict how the disease will progress. This research aims to uncover an immune signature that could guide personalized treatment approaches and improve patient outcomes.

To accelerate discoveries, Feldman founded the University of Michigan ALS Consortium in 2010, establishing a comprehensive repository containing biospecimens, clinical data, lifestyle and toxin exposure history, and postmortem tissues (brain, spinal cord, teeth) from over 1,300 ALS patients and age- and sex-matched healthy individuals. This resource has enabled the identification of epigenetic, transcriptomic, metabolomic, and immunological signatures associated with ALS, leading to the discovery of potential biomarkers and new therapeutic targets.

=== Neuropathy and diabetes complications ===
Feldman is also internationally known for her groundbreaking work on diabetes complications, particularly peripheral neuropathy. Her early work led to the development of the Michigan Neuropathy Screening Instrument (MNSI), a standardized, validated, and easy-to-use screening tool designed for the early detection of diabetic neuropathy. The MNSI provides a reliable and consistent method for diagnosing neuropathy across diverse clinical and research settings, helping to identify patients at risk before significant nerve damage occurs. Due to its efficacy and accessibility, the MNSI has been widely adopted in major clinical trials and epidemiological studies, where it has played a key role in advancing the understanding of diabetic neuropathy and shaping global diabetes management.

Her pioneering discoveries also include identifying obesity as a risk factor for peripheral neuropathy and establishing the metabolic syndrome as a composite risk factor across multiple large and diverse clinical cohorts. Feldman combined data from patient studies and lab models to show that diabetic peripheral neuropathy is not just caused by high blood sugar. Instead, it results from altered energy production in nerves due to abnormal processing of fat. This insight explains the classic stocking-glove presentation of diabetic peripheral neuropathy, where nerve damage progresses from distal (hands and feet) to proximal regions. These findings expanded the focus of research and clinical care from blood sugar control alone to a broader, multi-targeted metabolic approach. This led to NIH-funded interventional trials examining the effects of diet, exercise, and bariatric surgery, which have demonstrated that these strategies can stabilize or even improve neuropathy. As a result, the American Diabetes Association (ADA) now advocates diet and exercise as first-line therapy for diabetic peripheral neuropathy.

Feldman's current research interests focus on understanding the underlying causes of neuropathy and how it progresses over time, with a particular emphasis on the role of extracellular vesicles and Schwann cells in the pathogenesis of neuropathy. She is identifying key clinical risk factors that play a critical role in the development and worsening of neuropathy in patients with diabetes. She is developing risk assessment tools to guide the care of patients with diabetes and COVID-19, while also studying the neurological implications of long COVID in affected individuals.

=== Brain health and Alzheimer's disease ===
Feldman's research has also demonstrated critical connections between metabolic dysfunction and cognitive impairment. Her laboratory was among the first to show that brain neurons can become nonresponsive to insulin, a molecule essential for sugar metabolism and memory formation. Using preclinical models of diabetes, her team demonstrated that these models develop hallmarks of Alzheimer's disease pathology, including changes in tau protein, which is associated with neurodegeneration. Feldman has reported that cognitive performance is impaired in individuals with severe obesity compared to lean controls, and that waist circumference is a key metabolic risk factor for cognitive impairment, emphasizing the impact of metabolic health on brain function.

Feldman's current research focuses on uncovering the underlying causes and drivers of neurodegenerative conditions like dementia to develop targeted treatments. A key area of her work examines the complex interplay between aging, metabolic dysfunction, and neuroinflammation, particularly how these factors contribute to cognitive impairment and Alzheimer's disease. Using advanced omics techniques, her team is investigating how obesity alters brain microglia – the immune cells responsible for clearing debris and regulating inflammation in the brain.

Similar to her work on nerve health, she has also highlighted the potential benefits of diet and exercise for brain health. Drawing from insights gained from her pioneering ALS clinical trials, Feldman is developing stem cell therapies as a potential treatment for Alzheimer's disease and dementia. Her recent studies have demonstrated that transplanting stem cells into the brains of preclinical models with Alzheimer's disease improves cognitive outcomes and reduces disease pathology. Currently, her team is investigating the role of interneurons – specialized brain cells that connect sensory and motor neurons – in Alzheimer's disease progression and their potential as a therapeutic target for stem cell-based treatments.

== Sources ==
- A. Alfred Taubman Medical Research Institute
- The University of Michigan Health System
- The American Neurological Association
- "Stem cell treatment goes from lab to operating room". CNN. May 4, 2010. Archived from the original on September 20, 2010.
- "UM researcher to test stem cell treatment for Alzheimer's". Crain's Detroit Business. May 2, 2010.
- "Celling Out". D Business. March–April 2010.
- "First U.S. stem cells transplanted into spinal cord". CNN. January 21, 2010. Archived from the original on September 19, 2010.

== See also ==
- University of Michigan Medicine biography
