= Harald Hampel =

Harald J. Hampel
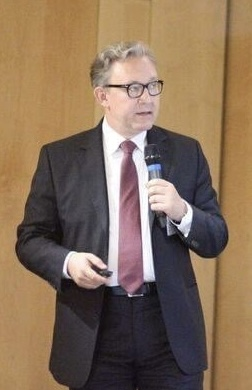
- Born: Singen, Germany
- Education: LMU Munich; Witten/Herdecke University
- Scientific career
- Fields: Neuroscience; Neurology; Psychiatry
- Workplaces: LMU Munich; Catholic University of Applied Sciences of North Rhine-Westphalia, Cologne; National Institutes of Health (NIH); Trinity College Dublin; Goethe University Frankfurt; Sorbonne University; Eisai; Bristol Myers Squibb
- Thesis: "One- and two-dimensional gel electrophoresis (2DE) of postmortem brain of schizophrenic patients and controls: detection and characterization of novel immunomodulatory proteins" (2001)

Harald J. Hampel is a German neuroscientist, and psychiatrist. His research focuses on early detection, the development of biological and neuroimaging markers, as well as pharmacological therapies and precision medicine for neurological and psychiatric conditions, particularly Alzheimer's disease and other neurodegenerative disorders.

== Early life and education ==
Hampel was born in Singen/Hohentwiel, Germany. He studied medicine at Witten/Herdecke University and LMU Munich, where he obtained his M.D. and habilitation. He was a Fellow of the German Academic Scholarship Foundation (Studienstiftung des Deutschen Volkes). In 1995, he moved to Washington D.C. for a post-doctoral fellowship at the National Institutes of Health (NIH), National Institute on Aging (NIA), Laboratory of Neurosciences in Bethesda, Maryland. In 1997, he became founding director of the Alzheimer Memorial Center at LMU Munich, where he was appointed professor of psychiatry in 2005. In 2006 he earned the degree of Master of Science in Health Care Administration from the Catholic University of Applied Sciences of North Rhine – Westphalia, Cologne.

== Academic career ==
Hampel held leadership positions at several international institutions. In 2006, he was appointed professor and chair of psychiatry at Trinity College, University of Dublin, Ireland. There he was a principal investigator at the Trinity College Institute of Neuroscience (TCIN). For his academic contributions, Trinity College Dublin elected him to professorial fellowship in 2007. In 2010, he was appointed professor, chair and head of Department of Psychiatry and Psychosomatic Medicine, and co-director of the Brain Imaging Center (BIC) at Goethe University Frankfurt. Hampel left the BIC in 2012, citing “irreconcilable differences”. In 2013, Hampel joined Sorbonne University in Paris, where he served as professor and AXA Research Fund and Sorbonne University Excellence Chair at the department of Neurology until 2019. Subsequently, he moved to the biopharmaceutical industry and assumed the position of chief medical officer, senior vice president and head of global medical affairs at Eisai Inc. (Nutley, New Jersey). During Hampel's tenure as Eisai's chief medical officer, the Alzheimer's disease treatment Leqembi (lecanemab) was approved and globally launched. In 2026, it was announced that Hampel was appointed Senior Vice President and Worldwide Head of Medical Affairs, Neuroscience at Bristol Myers Squibb (Princeton, New Jersey).

Hampel is member of the scientific advisory board of Sinaptica Therapeutics (Cambridge, Massachusetts). He was the founding president of the Alzheimer Precision Medicine Initiative (APMI), the Cholinergic System Working Group, and was Senior Associate Editor and Reviewing Editor for Alzheimer’s & Dementia, the journal of the Alzheimer's Association (Chicago, Illinois).

=== Research contributions ===
Hampel's work is dedicated to the development and advancement of conceptual scientific and medical research frameworks, as well as novel technologies for the early detection, diagnosis, prevention and treatment of neurological and psychiatric disorders such as Alzheimer's disease and related disorders. Areas of major contributions:

- Biological markers: Development and validation of genetic factors, cerebrospinal fluid (CSF), and blood-based biomarkers such as amyloid-beta species, tau- and neuroimmune proteins.
- Neuroimaging: Application and integration of structural, functional MRI and metabolic PET imaging to track morphological and functional brain and complex neural network changes across all stages of Alzheimer's disease.
- Precision Medicine: Clinical research using multi-modal longitudinal diagnostic studies integrating psychometric testing, genetics, fluid biomarkers, neuroimaging, neurophysiological methods, digital biomarkers, machine learning methods, as well as clinical development of symptomatic and disease-modifying treatments for patients with preclinical to symptomatic Alzheimer's disease.

Hampel holds twelve patents for his research and has received several scientific awards for his work, including the German Brain Foundation Research Award of the Hirnliga e.V., the Alois Alzheimer Research Award from Goethe University Frankfurt and the Katharina Hardt Research Award from the Katharina Hardt Foundation.

== Selected publications ==
As of 2026, more than 900 publications by Harald Hampel as author or co-author are listed in PubMed, and he shows an H-index of 160.

His publications have 132,000 citations, major works include, among others:

- Narasimhan, Sneha; Holtzman, David M.; Apostolova, Liana G.; Hampel, Harald; et al.: Apolipoprotein E in Alzheimer's disease trajectories and the next-generation clinical care pathway. In: Nature Neuroscience. 2024. doi:10.1038/s41593-024-01669-5.
- Hampel, Harald; Hu, Yan; Cummings, Jeffrey; et al.: Blood-based biomarkers for Alzheimer's disease: Current state and future use in a transformed global healthcare landscape. In: Neuron. 2023. doi:10.1016/j.neuron.2023.05.017.
- Hampel, Harald; Gao, Peng; Cummings, Jeffrey; et al.: The foundation and architecture of precision medicine in neurology and psychiatry. In: Trends in Neurosciences. Vol. 46, No. 3, 2023, pp. 176–198. doi:10.1016/j.tins.2022.12.004.
- Hampel, Harald; Au, Rhoda; Mattke, Soeren; et al.: Designing the next-generation clinical care pathway for Alzheimer's disease. In: Nature Aging. Vol. 2, 2022, pp. 692–703. doi:10.1038/s43587-022-00269-x.
- Hampel, Harald; Hardy, John; Blennow, Kaj; et al.: The Amyloid-β Pathway in Alzheimer's Disease. In: Molecular Psychiatry. Vol. 26, 2021, pp. 5481–5503. doi:10.1038/s41380-021-01249-0.
- Hampel, Harald; Cummings, Jeffrey; Blennow, Kaj; et al.: Developing the ATX(N) classification for use across the Alzheimer disease continuum. In: Nature Reviews Neurology. 2021. doi:10.1038/s41582-021-00520-w.
- Hampel, Harald; O’Bryant, Sid E.; Molinuevo, José L.; et al.: Kaj Blennow: Blood-based biomarkers for Alzheimer disease: mapping the road to the clinic. In: Nature Reviews Neurology. 2018. doi:10.1038/s41582-018-0079-7.
- Hampel, Harald; Mesulam, M.-Marsel; Cuello, A. Claudio; et al.: The cholinergic system in the pathophysiology and treatment of Alzheimer's disease. In: Brain. 2018. doi:10.1093/brain/awy132.
- Dubois, Bruno; Epelbaum, Stéphane; Nyasse, Francis; Hampel, Harald; et al.: Cognitive and neuroimaging features and brain β-amyloidosis in individuals at risk of Alzheimer's disease (INSIGHT-preAD): a longitudinal observational study. In: The Lancet Neurology. Vol. 17, No. 4, 2018, pp. 335–346. doi:10.1016/S1474-4422(18)30029-2.
- Hampel, Harald; Frank, Richard; Broich, Karl; et al.: Biomarkers for Alzheimer's disease: academic, industry and regulatory perspectives. In: Nature Reviews Drug Discovery. Vol. 9, No. 7, 2010, pp. 560–574. doi:10.1038/nrd3115.
