= Jude Reyes =

American billionaire businessman (born 1955)

- Born: 1955 (age 70–71); Washington DC, US
- Education: Wofford College
- Occupation: Businessman
- Title: Co-chairman, Reyes Holdings
- Spouse: Lori Welch Reyes
- Children: 3
- Relatives: J. Christopher Reyes (brother); Robert S. Taubman (brother-n-law)

Michael Jude Reyes (born 1955) is an American billionaire businessman, co-chairman (with his brother J. Christopher Reyes) of Reyes Holdings, a beer and food distribution holding company, which includes the Martin-Brower Company, McDonald's's largest distributor.

== Early life ==
Jude Reyes was born in 1955 in Washington DC. He earned a bachelor's degree from Wofford College.

== Career ==
According to Forbes, Reyes has a net worth of $6.8 billion, as of June 2020.

== Political activity ==
Reyes contributed $50,000 to Donald Trump's 2020 presidential campaign. Reyes and his brother J. Christopher spent $20.1 million in support of Republican candidates in the 2026 United States elections.

== Personal life ==
Reyes is married to Lori Welch Reyes, they have three children and live in Palm Beach, Florida.
