= Louis Dubin =

American businessman (born 1963)

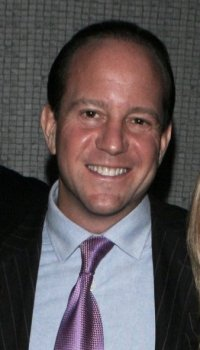
- Louis Dubin
- Born: Louis Myerberg Dubin; January 31, 1963 (age 63); United States
- Education: Washington and Lee University; Washington College of Law
- Occupation: Developer
- Known for: Speeches: "The Lawyer as Entrepreneur" (2008); Graduation speech Columbia Law School (2007)
- Spouses: Tiffany Elizabeth Rounick (m. 1989; div. 2005) Martine N. Dubin (m. 2012)
- Children: 3
- Parent(s): Richard & Elizabeth; Dubin
- Awards: "1993 Real Estate; Deal of the Year"; Corporate leadership award (2003); CHDD award (2004); Best residential high-rise building in US (CNBC/NY Times) (2008); Our Town Awards; Upper east-side (2005); Upper west-side (2006)

Louis Myerberg Dubin (born January 31, 1963) is a fourth-generation real estate developer who develops upscale condominiums, typically in large east-coast United States cities. He is a founding partner of Redbrick LMD, an opportunistic real estate investment and developments company headquartered in Washington, D.C. His former New York based firm Athena often sold condominiums to middle and upper-middle class buyers. His firm converted landmark buildings into luxury condominiums, one of which was bought by Charles Bronfman. He designed buildings to feature art by artist-sculptors such as Jonathan Cramer. He was described by New York Magazine as being one of the "new generation of uptown A-listers".

== Background and education ==
Dubin's great-grandfather, grandfather, and father were all developers. He studied political science at Washington and Lee University. During his college years, he met future wife, Tiffany Rounick, whose stepfather was A. Alfred Taubman, the Detroit-based shopping mall pioneer. Dubin earned a J.D. degree at American University Washington College of Law. The pair were married in 1989 at the "socially prestigious" Temple Emanu-El in Manhattan and fashion reporters from the New York Times described that guests wore "crisply tailored suit jackets worn over long, narrow skirts."

== Career ==
A few months after graduating from law school, Dubin built 24 homes outside Annapolis and sold them for $150,000 each. The project gave him credibility to work with family members on "somewhat of an even keel". He worked in his family's real estate development firm as general counsel and helped the family develop single-family, high-rise condominium, and planned community properties.

Dubin worked for the government in the position of director of the $1.7 billion National Land Fund for the Resolution Trust Corporation. This agency disposed of assets acquired by the government during the early 1990s. It exposed him to the world of high finance "a tool that was somewhat lacking in my skill sets" he recalled later. Dubin formed strategic partnerships between the private sector and the government. He described his role: "I was a federal official running clean up for all the non-performing land in the United States." He serves as chairman of the Maryland Governor's Workforce Development Board.

=== Athena ===
In 1993, Dubin founded the Athena Group, a residential real estate investment and development fund. It was structured legally as a limited liability company or LLC. Dubin was both president and CEO.

The business approach was to identify opportunistic real estate projects. "My goals at the time were to buy real estate below replacement cost and to redevelop neglected assets." Dubin hired Rosen Consulting to do macroeconomic forecasts of job development and household formation in key cities in the United States. The next step was having acquisitions people hunt for opportunities in those markets. Dubin hired analysts typically with Master's degrees in Real Estate as well as MBAs who he felt were "well rounded individuals" and "tactile with numbers" yet had a feel for "concepts and form." Employees were encouraged to listen attentively to the market, and included former lawyers, bankers, textile design curators, tank platoon commanders, architects, and construction managers. Athena had weekly development meetings with employees at all levels as a way, in part, "for teaching the younger people the business." The firm cooperated with state and local officials. Dubin saw his work as a developer at the confluence of many forces, including investors, regulators, architects, and found the work to be fascinating. Athena developed a proprietary fund in association with large investment banks such as Morgan Stanley and UBS which gave it ready access to cash for large projects; for large deals, Athena solicited partners. Dubin described his firm as existing in a "nether land where we have the capitalization of a public company and the nimbleness of a private company." In the early 1990s, the firm had a return on investment equity over 30%, according to Dubin.

While the principal focus of Athena was on residential properties with "high barriers to entry" in the eastern United States, principally New York City, the firm also did projects involving offices, condominium conversions, land development deals, distressed debt purchases, and renovation projects. Dubin's role in the firm has been described as developing and cultivating relationships with parties necessary for big deals, including financiers, advisers, investment banks, developers, architects, and builders.

The firm screened and analyzed possible acquisitions. When it found properties to buy, it would analyze a prospective purchase in depth, including doing due diligence, which is a comprehensive real estate checklist process of examining systematically such details as environmental issues, geological and marketing factors. It thrived during the real estate boom years during the early and middle years of the 2000s.

In the early 2000s, Athena bought a building in Miami's South Beach called The Waverly. It got an internal rate of return in the low 20s, according to Dubin. Around this time the firm had a project in Providence, Rhode Island, called the "903", which featured prices in the range of $350 per square foot. In 2002, the firm encountered a setback when 78-year-old Taubman was convicted of price-fixing in connection with his ownership of the Manhattan-based auction house Sotheby's and he spent ten months in jail.

In 2004, Athena had $265 million in residential and commercial sales. Condos were pitched at middle to upper-middle class buyers, and prices were at or below the median prices for their respective cities, and ranged from $200 to $2,000 per square foot, according to Dubin. By 2005, during the real estate boom, it had invested $200 million in properties worth a total of $1 billion, according to one estimate. At one point, the firm had a construction and development pipeline exceeding $1.8 billion, according to one source. From 2002 to 2005, Athena focused on condominium conversion projects, but after 2005, shifted to real estate development which included building new high-rise structures from the ground up. It worked with Detroit-based construction contractor Walbridge Aldinger on tasks such as preconstruction, estimating, predevelopment and construction-bidding work. In 2005, the shortage of prime space in downtown Manhattan caused several hotels to be converted to condominiums. Dubin explained that "economic calculations heavily favor conversion ... For a 1,000-square-foot hotel suite, you could get $2 million. At a top hotel with services and a great location, let's take those two rooms—they have to throw off $400 to $500 a night, and they have maybe 70 percent occupancy ... In the best of cases, they could net $200,000 [per year]. Property taxes take 35 percent, maybe 40 percent for operations—that's only a 5 to 6 percent return."

In the first part of the decade as well, Athena considered investments in projects in Russia but pulled out because of concerns about timing. Athena did projects in the suburbs of Washington, Florida, Providence, North Carolina, Utah, Las Vegas and Los Angeles. Athena's projects have been financed by firms such as Morgan Stanley and UBS AG. By 2008, it had up to 45 employees with a main office in New York and branch offices in Los Angeles, Miami, and Washington, and had 4,500 residential units under management, according to a source based on company information. By 2009, according to one estimate, the firm had completed or developed roughly $2.5 billion in assets. The firm streamlined payment systems by using software from firms such as AvidXchange which digitized invoices.

The firm made campaign contributions to both Democrats and Republicans, including John McCain, Mitt Romney, Robert Menendez, and Hillary Clinton.

=== Fifth Avenue Opulence ===
In the late 1990s, a prominent headquarters building for the 11-story Union of American Hebrew Congregations at 838 Fifth Avenue at 65th street, originally built in 1950, was bought by A. Alfred Taubman, and who worked with Athena to convert the units to luxury condominiums. Sonnenblick-Goldman arranged some of the financing. The building is opposite Temple Emanu-El. Athena worked with architects Beyer Blinder Belle and created storage rooms, wine cellars, and servants' quarters for each unit. There was controversy about how to handle religious inscriptions on the building's exterior, which included "Love Thy Neighbor As Thyself" and "Do Justly Love Mercy Walk Humbly With God", and discussion was picked up in the New Yorker. The building features a "discrete access ramp" for the disabled on the southeast corner. It was converted from an 11-story office building into a 10-unit residential condominium project. The building was expanded by adding one floor and a 10-story addition on 65th Street. Limestone from the same quarry in Indiana used for the original building was used for the restoration. According to spokesperson Bret S. Bobo, developers were drawn to the building because it was "the only opportunity left in a prime location." Apartments ranged from 4,522 to 5,423 square feet (503.8 m^{2}). Interiors were demolished and reconfigured with nine-foot-high ceilings, and included corner living rooms of up to 47 by 20 feet (6.1 m) and libraries with wood-burning fireplaces. Buyers had the option of purchasing one of seven ground floor studio apartments. Nine 45-square-foot (4.2 m^{2}) wine cellars and fifteen storage units were for sale in the basement. One unit was bought by Charles Bronfman, co-chairman of Seagram, and the sale was reported to be $18 million, according to several sources. Other units sold for $16 million and $12 million and were described in New York Magazine as chic. Renovation work happened in 2000 and 2001.

=== Liberty Lofts ===
In the early 2000s, Athena acquired and converted the Liberty Warehouse property in the Lincoln Center district of Manhattan at 43 West 64th street. Sonnenblick-Goldman arranged financing for the deal, according to one source. The building was described as a "quiet enclave" and "very residential" and close to midtown, shopping, transportation, and restaurants. Dubin said "It's the first project on the Upper West Side to truly incorporate loft living." Athena took the old Liberty Warehouse and modernized it; since it operated an entire block, the new building featured a drive-through area for valet parking. Renovated units were priced from $1 million and $4 million, and penthouses cost between $5 million and $10 million. The new building was marketed as "Liberty Lofts." Since 1902, the building had a 37-foot (11 m) high copper statue built in Akron, Ohio that was closely modeled on the Statue of Liberty and which was visible from Lincoln Center. Dubin appealed in the New York Times for ideas about what to do with the statue. During renovation, Athena added four floors, reclad the building, and created loft-style condominiums ranging from 1600 to 6,151 square feet (571.4 m^{2}). In February 2002, the Liberty statue was moved to the Brooklyn Museum of Art. Residents included Gretchen Carlson, host of the CBS Early Show and her husband Casey Close.

=== Central Park North ===
In 2003, Athena bought Harlem property on Central Park North. Initial plans called for a 20-floor high-rise doorman-building with 80 units targeted to upper-middle-class families and single professionals with prices for each unit ranging from $500,000 to $1.7 million. Dubin said "This is an opportunity for New Yorkers to be on the park at roughly half the price of Central Park South." The rebirth of Harlem along Central Park north had attracted celebrities such as Marcia Gay Harden, Maya Angelou, and Kareem Abdul-Jabbar. The finished building was 20 stories tall with 48 residential units, 9,500 of ground floor retail space, 48 parking spaces, and each unit had a view of Central Park. In December 2006, 30% of the units had been presold, and prices per square foot were about $1,200, and parking spaces cost $75,000. To encourage sales, Dubin teamed with Esquire Magazine and its advertisers to throw a lavish party in September 2007. Cramer made the outdoor sculpture called The Shape Matrix that greets visitors upon arrival to the property. According to one report, Athena and the magazine commandeered, for the party, "a pair of penthouses, a 4,000-square-foot triplex with an additional 1,700 square feet of terraces," with a projection screen to "mimic an airplane's interiors, courtesy of Lufthansa." A living room with 22-foot (6.7 m) ceilings featured designs by Versace and Campion Platt. The showroom penthouse was listed for $8.5 million, and most apartments, featuring three bedrooms, two and a half baths, and 1,900 square feet (180 m^{2}) of space, were listed at $2.1 million. One newspaper account suggested the property was "the only condominium in Harlem that has achieved a sales price of $1,000 a square foot." By August 2007, more than 70% of the building was sold with prices sometimes reaching $1,200 a square foot, according to Dubin.

=== The A Condominiums in Jersey City ===
Athena developed luxury condominiums across the Hudson River from Manhattan in Jersey City Developers thought that across-the-river condominiums were "an attractive alternative for high net worth apartment seekers who want to remain in the metropolitan area," according to a quote in the newspaper from one of the financiers. Dubin noted that Jersey City was in a "phenomenal housing boom." The deal was finalized, and construction began in November 2005. The skyscraper was close to subways called PATH trains for Manhattan-bound commuters. Dubin worked with financial advisers Sonnenblick-Goldman who helped secure construction loans from Chicago-based financiers Corus Bank and GoldenTree InSite Partners. One estimate was the project was valued at $112 million in debt and equity. A second estimate was $110 million. Dubin brought in architects from the Hillier Group as well as Schuman, Lichtenstein, Claman and Efron who designed the brick and glass facade. The project, dubbed "A" Jersey City, was a 33-story tower with 250 apartments, 10,500 square feet (980 m^{2}) of ground-floor retail space, a 238-space parking garage from the second through sixth floors. Dubin again brought in artist-sculptor Jonathan Cramer who made a sculpture entitled "The A" outside the building. Each unit had its own balcony and were marketed to consumers as having "panoramic views" of the Manhattan skyline. To make the condominiums attractive to upscale buyers, amenities included around-the-clock concierge and personal assistant services, a private fitness center, a westward-facing terrace, and each unit had 9'4" ceilings. Dubin commissioned public sculptures to promote the project.

=== Public Speaking ===
Dubin spoke at public meetings regarding real estate trends. Dubin gave the commencement speech at Columbia University's Masters in Real Estate Development graduation in 2007. Dubin returned to his alma mater, Washington College of Law at American University, to speak on real estate topics on several occasions. Dubin believes there is a need for affordable housing and thinks "low density zoning" would be beneficial in some communities; in others, "abysmal, high profile failures" have tainted the image of high-density projects. He has been a panelist on discussions about condominium development and conversion. Dubin was on television in 2007. In a commencement speech at Columbia University's graduate real estate program, he emphasized the importance of listening and how it requires patience and discipline to listen effectively.

=== Bust ===
The real estate bust beginning 2007 and extending into 2008 hit Athena hard. Dubin, along with many other developers, did not predict the down-cycle; financing dried up; plans stalled, and then were dropped. In September 2006, there were plans to develop another property in Jersey City by working with the Netherlands-based Office for Metropolitan Architecture and architect Rem Koolhaas. A mixed-use, $300 million joint venture project featuring retailers, restaurants, and housing units in northern Las Vegas with Vestar Development dubbed "Heart of North Las Vegas" was planned in 2007, which was supposed to have "outdoor fireplaces, pop-jet fountains, a video wall, a performance stage, shaded pedestrian walkways and tailored landscaping." There were plans to promote the Las Vegas project with a "naming contest" in which the winner would receive free college payments for four years to any college. Credit dried up; the real estate bubble burst; plans fizzled. One real estate journal reported that "Athena Group ... created a lot of hype over a 160-acre, mixed-use development ... by asking the community to come up with a name for it and awarding a four-year college scholarship to the winner. That's about as far as it's gone." Plans to break ground in 2007 were delayed. Dubin said in 2008: "We have put off a number of projects for the foreseeable future."

=== Rebirth ===
In 2008, Dubin and Athena parted ways, and he formed another real estate firm called LMD Worldwide LLC which was patterned after his initials.

=== The St. Joe Company ===
Louis Dubin joined the Florida land developer named the St. Joe Company in June 2012 as an executive where he structured large scale development partnerships and worked on the strategy, tactics and vision.

=== Redbrick LMD ===
In the Fall of 2013, after his work at St. Joe Company, Mr Dubin merged LMD Worldwide with Redbrick, a prominent Washington D.C.-based real estate investment and development firm which specializes in opportunistic and value-added residential and mixed-use projects with a focus on the Washington, D.C. metropolitan market.

== Personal life ==
Dubin is married to media entrepreneur Martine Dubin and has 3 children, a daughter from his first marriage to Tiffany Rounick, a stepson, and a son. Dubin works with the Real Estate Advisory Committee of the New York Common Retirement Fund. He is the Co-Chair of the Cyber Security Task Force of the Governor's Workforce Board for the State of Maryland.

Dubin was described in New York Magazine in 1998 as one of the city's social leaders who were "all born after the baby boom and free of its disdain for old conventions", and was a member of the "uptown A-listers" including Prince Alexander von Fürstenberg, Pia Getty, The Crown Princess of Greece, and fashion designer Carolina Herrera Jr.
