= A. Alfred Taubman =

American businessman (1924–2015)

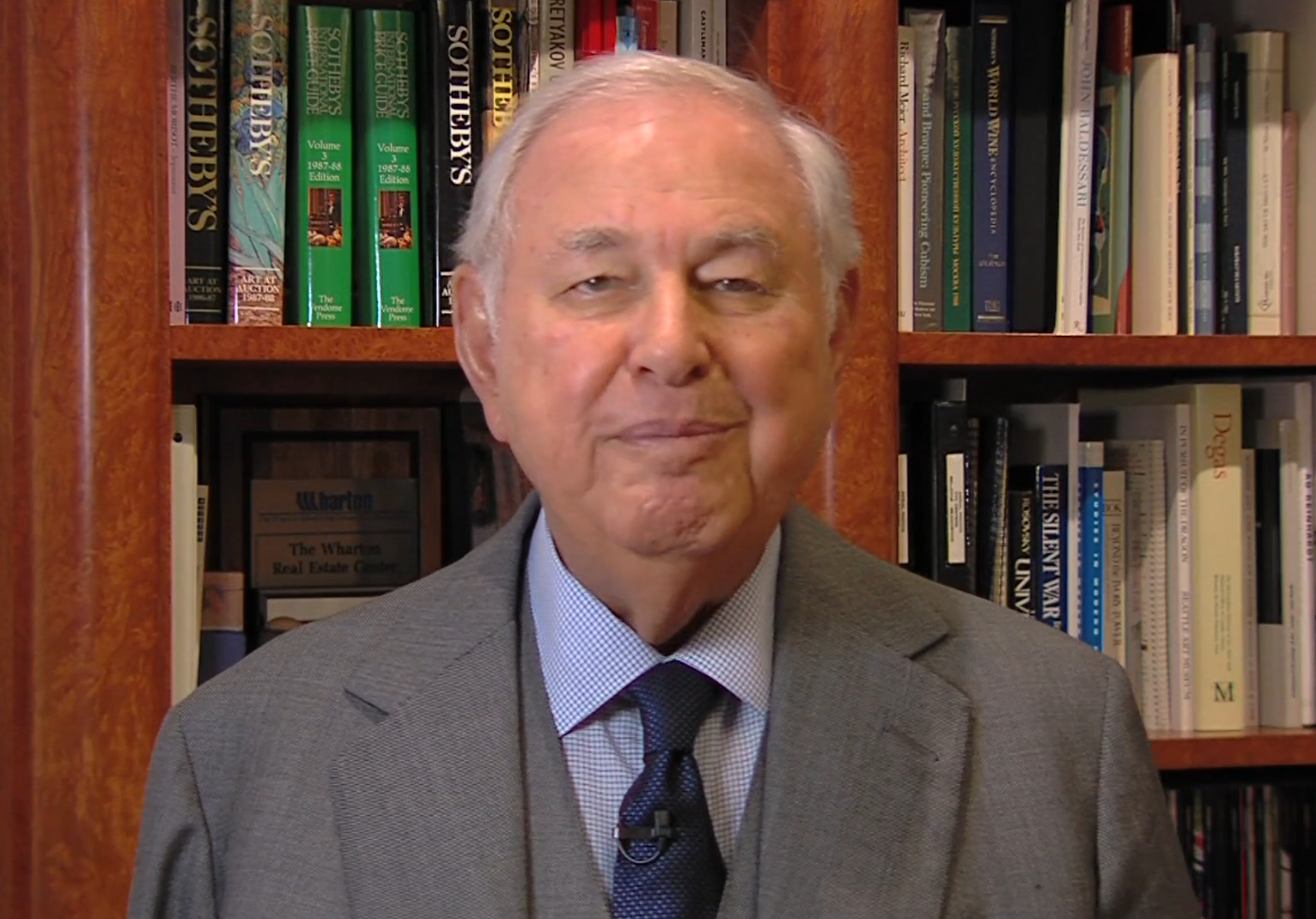
- Taubman in 2010
- Born: Adolph Alfred Taubman; January 31, 1924; Pontiac, Michigan, U.S.
- Died: April 17, 2015 (aged 91); Bloomfield Hills, Michigan, U.S.
- Education: University of Michigan; Lawrence Technological University
- Occupation: Real estate developer
- Known for: Designing modern indoor shopping malls
- Spouses: Reva Kolodney (1948–1977; divorced); Judith (Mazor) Rounick (1982–2015; his death)
- Children: 5, including Robert S. Taubman

Adolph Alfred "Al" Taubman (January 31, 1924 – April 17, 2015) was an American businessman, investor, and philanthropist.

In 2002, he was convicted for a price-fixing scheme involving the top two auction houses in the United States.

== Early life and education ==
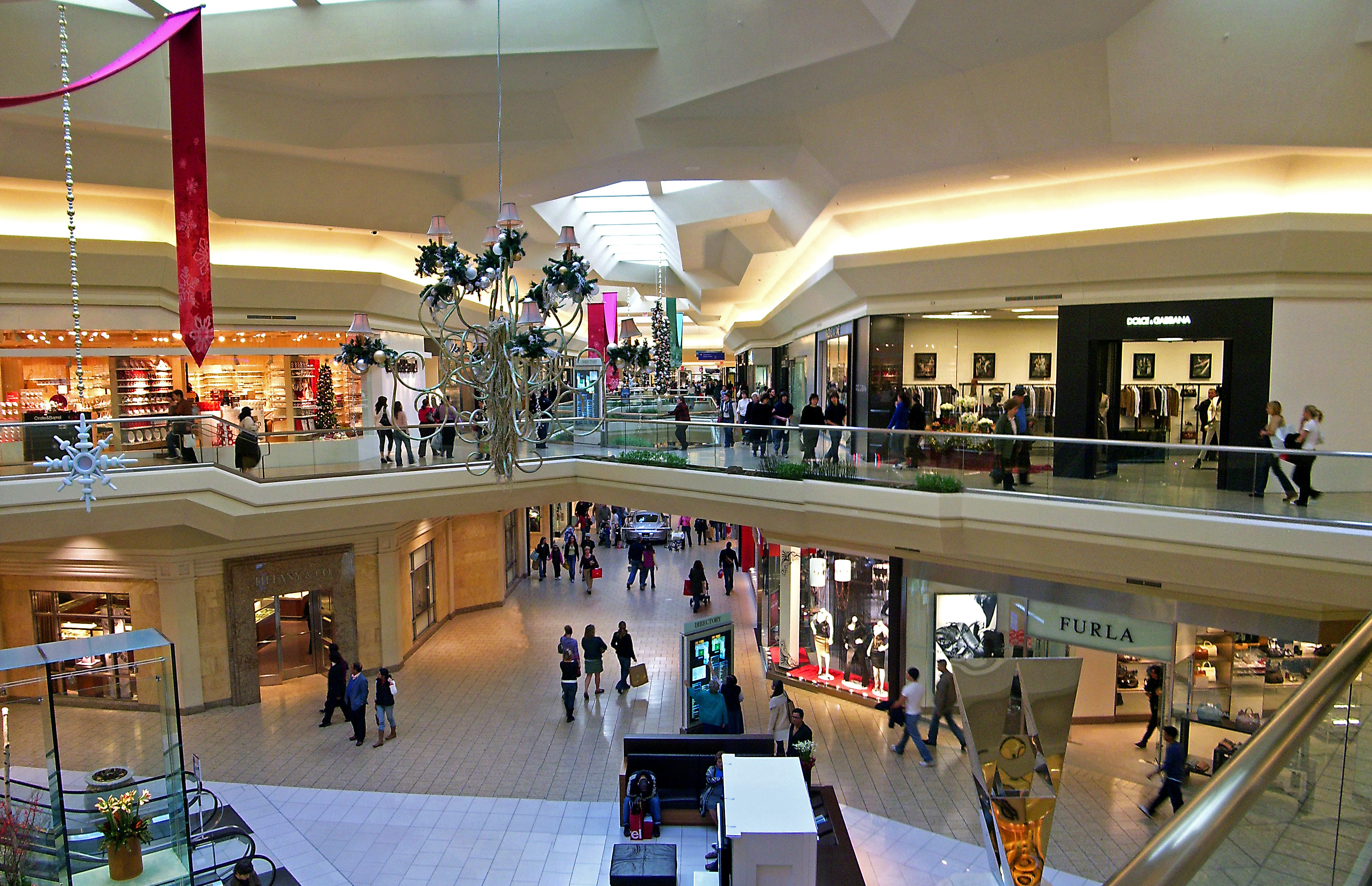
The Mall at Short Hills in Short Hills, New Jersey, developed by Taubman's company

Taubman was born in Pontiac, Michigan, on January 31, 1924, to Jewish immigrants Fannie Ester Blustin and Philip Taubman. His parents emigrated to the United States from Białystok, in northeastern Poland. His mother was his father's second cousin. Arriving up the Mississippi River by boat, Philip took a job with the Wilson Foundry Company in Davenport, Iowa, and his sister Goldye (born 1913) and older brothers Sam (born 1915) and Lester (born 1920) were born in Davenport. His father transferred to Pontiac in 1920, became a fruit farmer, then began developing commercial real estate and custom homes and built the first synagogue in Pontiac.

Taubman's parents lost everything in the Depression of the 1930s, and Taubman had to find work to help support the family at age nine. He is a graduate of Pontiac Central High School, and enrolled at the University of Michigan just prior to the United States' entry into World War II. He enlisted in the U.S. Air Force during his freshman year, served with the Thirteenth Expeditionary Air Force as a mapmaker in the Pacific Theater during the war, and returned under the G.I. Bill to the University of Michigan to continue his studies after the end of World War II.

Taubman studied architecture at the University of Michigan's College of Architecture and Design, where he was a member of Zeta Beta Tau fraternity and Lawrence Technological University, but graduated from neither.

== Career ==
=== Shopping mall development ===
Taubman incorporated Taubman Centers, Inc. in 1973. Thirteen years later, in 1986, the company relocated its headquarters to Bloomfield Hills, Michigan.

He was a designer and is credited with popularizing the modern indoor shopping mall. His developments such as the Mall at Short Hills in New Jersey continue to be ranked among the most profitable shopping centers in the country as of 2007. He made a fortune which Forbes magazine estimated at $3.1 billion and was on the list of Forbes 400 Richest Americans for two decades.

In October 2003, his real estate firm Taubman Centers survived a hostile takeover bid by the Simon Property Group and Westfield America. On February 10, 2020, it was announced that Simon Property Group had entered into a deal to acquire Taubman Centers for $52.50 a share, in a deal valued at $3.6 billion.

=== Sotheby's ===
Taubman bought ailing British auction house Sotheby's in 1983, acting as a white knight when the company was threatened by an unwelcome hostile takeover by Marshall Cogan and Stephen Swid of General Felt. He revived the fortunes of Sotheby's, which had been slumping in the 1980s, and took the company public in 1988. His family divested controlling interest in Sotheby's by September 2005.

=== Other business ===
Taubman led a group that bought the Irvine Company in 1977 and sold his stake to Donald Bren in 1983.

Taubman bought A&W Restaurants in 1982, and sold it to Sagittarius Acquisitions in December 1994.

From 1983 to 1984, Taubman was the majority owner of the Michigan Panthers of the United States Football League. Although the Panthers acquired a fairly loyal following and won the first USFL title in 1983, the USFL's decision to move from the spring to the fall led Taubman to merge his team with the Oakland Invaders for the 1985 season, with himself as majority owner of the Invaders. That team folded along with the rest of the USFL after the 1985 season.

In 1993, he invested in Athena Group, which developed residential and office properties in the U.S., Russia, and Azerbaijan. During the mid-1990s, he also acted as a consultant for commercial real estate projects in Russia, on developments such as Arbat Center, Balchug Plaza, Moscow Logistics Park, Four Winds Plaza, and Leninsky Prospekt in Azerbaijan.

== Antitrust conviction ==
In the early 2000s, a four-year investigation into alleged price-fixing masterminded by Taubman between Sotheby's and chairman Sir Anthony Tennant's rival auction house Christie's led to a confession by Sotheby's CEO Diana Brooks of an elaborate price fixing scheme with her counterpart at Christie's, Christopher Davidge. At the time, Christie's and Sotheby's controlled 90% of the world's market for fine furniture, fine art and exquisite jewelry.

In a plea bargain arrangement, prosecutors offered to keep Brooks out of prison if she agreed to implicate Taubman. She did, and Taubman was later convicted of price fixing in a jury trial. He was fined $7.5 million (USD) and imprisoned for ten months in 2002 for antitrust violations. Taubman was released in 2003, and continued to insist on his innocence.

== Personal life ==
Taubman was married twice. In 1948, Taubman married his college sweetheart, Reva Kolodney. In 1977, they divorced after 29 years of marriage. They had three children:

- Gayle Taubman Kalisman (b. 1951) is co-chair of the Taubman Institute and a University of Michigan alumna.
- Robert S. Taubman (b. 1953) serves as chairman, president and chief executive officer of the Taubman Company.
- William S. Taubman (b. 1958) serves as chief operating officer of the Taubman Company.

In 1982, he married Judith Mazor Rounick (b. 1943 as Jehudit Mazor), the daughter of a paste jewelry importer-exporter and a former Miss Israel in 1962. Judy grew up in Israel and had two children from a previous marriage to clothing manufacturer Herbert Rounick: Christopher Rounick and Tiffany Rounick Dubin, who was formerly married to real estate developer Louis Dubin. Judith's brother is Boaz Mazor, who is the sales director for Oscar de la Renta.

== Death ==
Taubman died on April 17, 2015, of a heart attack at the age of 91 in Bloomfield Hills, Michigan.

== Philanthropy ==
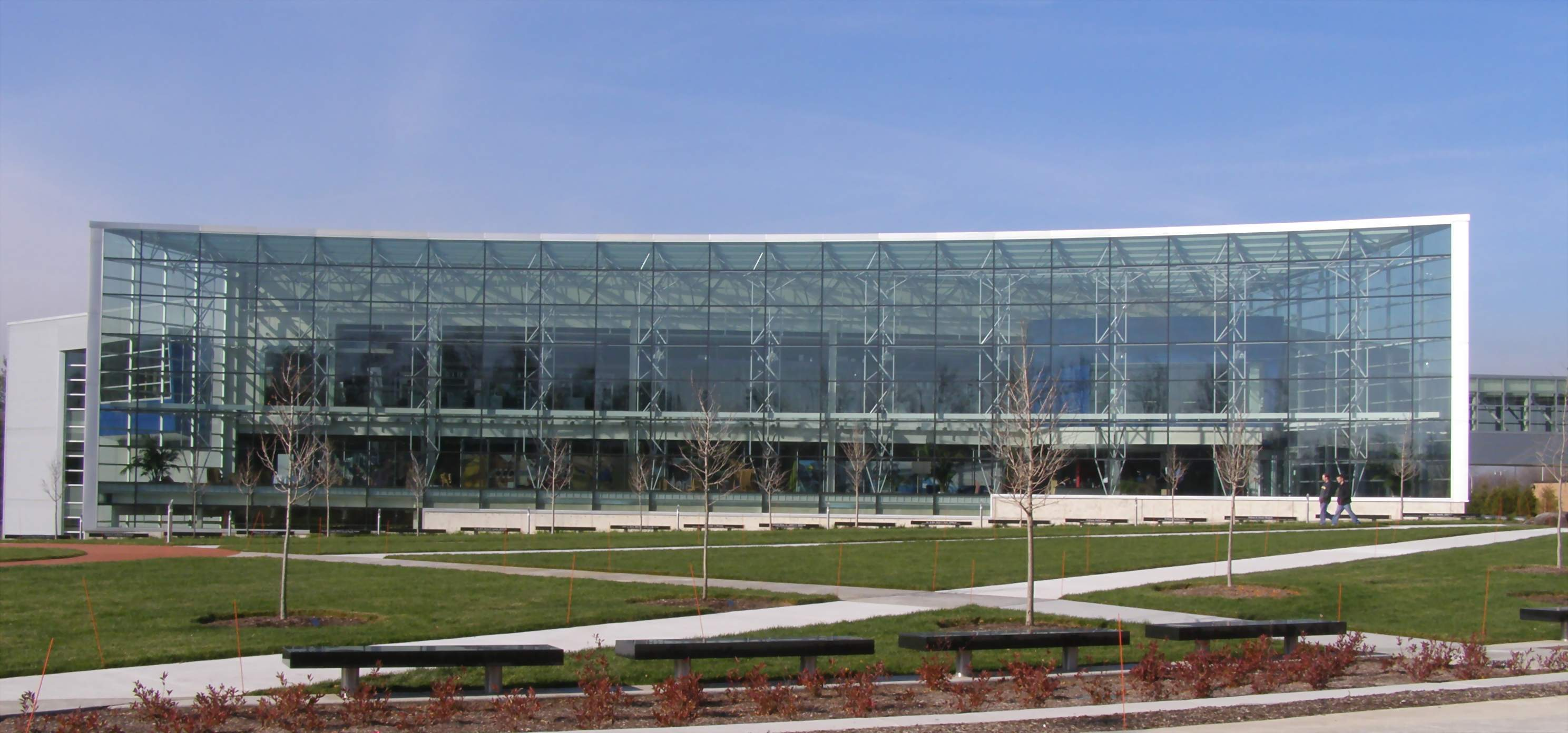
The A. Alfred Taubman Student Services Center at Lawrence Technological University, pictured in 2006, has an extensive glass façade and modern design

Taubman donated large sums to the University of Michigan and many buildings there are named after him, including the A. Alfred Taubman Biomedical Science Research Building, the Taubman Health Sciences Library and Taubman Health Care Center. A school within the university is also named for him: the Taubman College of Architecture and Urban Planning. Taubman was also a major sponsor of disease research: a late donation, a gift of $5 million to support the University of Michigan's Dr. Eva Feldman's and Dr. Yehoash Raphael's research, was aimed at the development of new treatments for Lou Gehrig's disease and deafness, respectively. In 2011, Taubman donated $56 million to medical research. These donations brought his lifetime giving to Michigan to a total of $141 million.

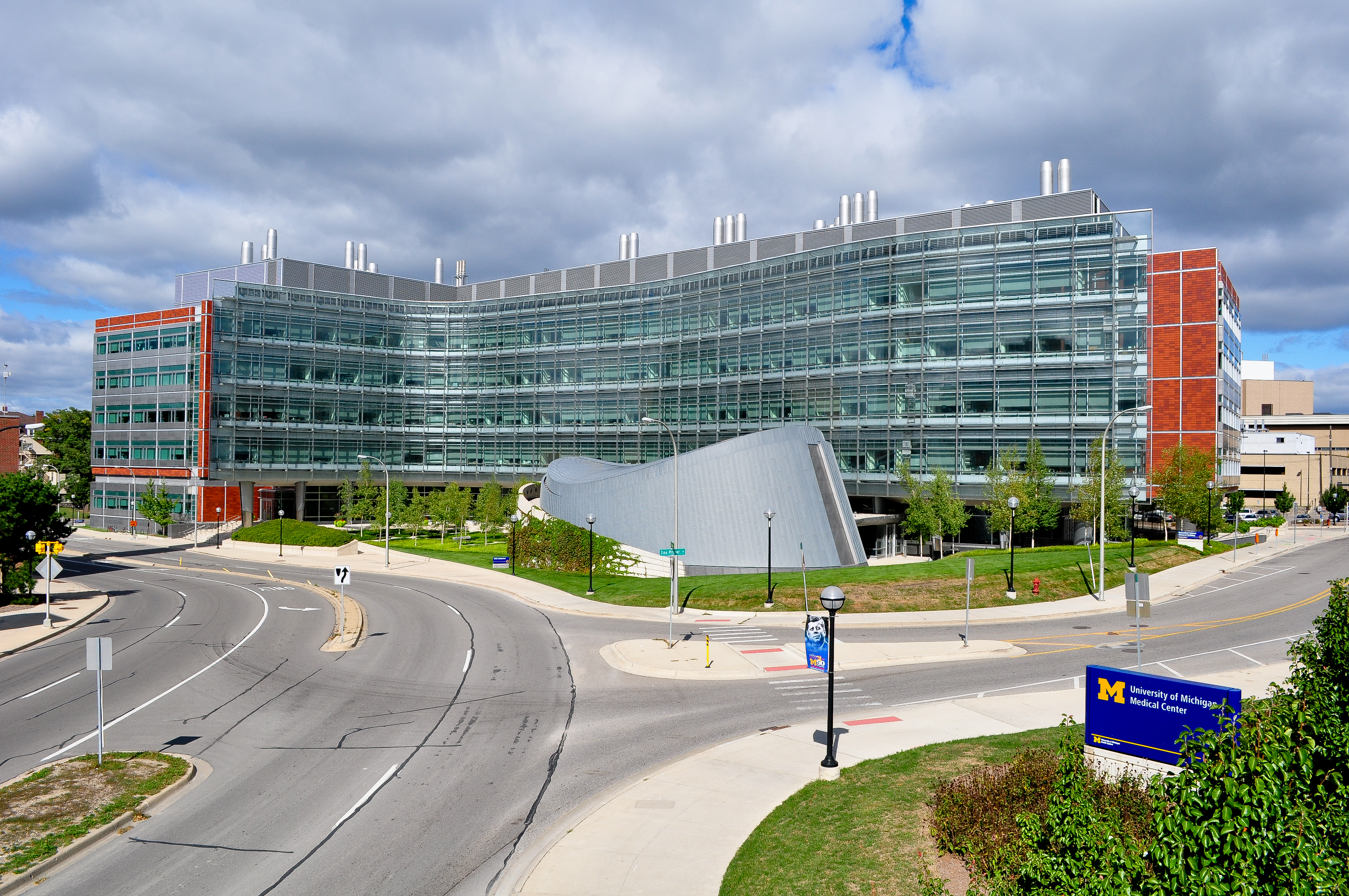
The A. Alfred Taubman Biomedical Science Research Building at the University of Michigan

He also donated to the Taubman Center for Public Policy at Brown University, and The Taubman Center for State and Local Government at Harvard University.

The A. Alfred Taubman Student Services Center at Lawrence Technological University was completed in 2006, and ground was broken in September 2015 for the A. Alfred Taubman Engineering, Architecture, and Life Sciences Complex at Lawrence Tech. Taubman had also taught a class at LTU focusing on his retail real estate development experience.

The A. Alfred Taubman Center for Design Education at the College for Creative Studies was completed in 2009, in which Taubman contributed $15 million to the $145 million budget for restoration and remodeling of what once was the General Motors Argonaut Building.

Taubman was chairman of the National Realty Committee (NRC) (later The Real Estate Roundtable) (RER) during 1967–1977. He was also a member of the Urban Land Institute, and held positions on the Board of Governors, the Steering Committee for Shopping Centers, and the Commercial and Retail Development Council.

After his death, Sotheby's said Taubman's art collection was valued at more than $500 million and would be auctioned in New York.

== See also ==
- Woodward & Lothrop
- May Department Stores
- Wanamaker's
- Michigan Panthers
- François Pinault
- Victor Gruen, inventor of the modern, enclosed shopping mall
