= Reyes Holdings =

American foodservice wholesaler and distributor

Reyes Holdings, LLC
- Type: Private
- Industry: Food Wholesale and Distribution
- Founded: 1976; 50 years ago in Spartanburg, South Carolina.
- Founder: J. Christopher Reyes; Jude Reyes
- Headquarters: Rosemont, Illinois, United States
- Revenue: $40 billion
- Website: reyesholdings.com

Reyes Holdings, LLC is an American food and beverage distributor and bottler that ranks as the 6th largest privately held company in the United States, with annual sales in excess of US$40 billion. Operations span 18 countries in North, Central, and South America, as well as Europe, the Middle East, and Asia Pacific. Reyes Holdings subdivisions include Reyes Beverage Group, the largest beer distributor in the United States, Martin Brower, McDonald's largest global distributor, and Reyes Coca-Cola Bottling, a Midwest and West Coast bottler and distributor. The company is based in Rosemont, Illinois, a suburb of Chicago.

== Operations ==
=== Beer distribution ===
Reyes Beverage Group is the largest beer distribution organization in the United States, representing import, craft, and domestic beer brands. The beer distribution operations within Reyes Holdings, LLC, are collectively known as Reyes Beverage Group, distributing over 272 million cases of beer to over 100,000 customers annually. The beer distribution operations within Reyes Beverage Group are:

- Chicago Beverage Systems, in Chicago, Illinois
- Premium Distributors of Virginia, in Chantilly, Virginia
- Harbor Distributing Co., in Huntington Beach Gardena, Santa Fe Springs, California
- Premium Distributors, of Washington, D.C.
- Lee Distributors, in Charleston, South Carolina
- Premium Distributors, of Maryland in Frederick, Maryland
- Gate City Beverage, in San Bernardino, California
- Crest Beverage, in San Diego, California
- Florida Distributing Company, in Orlando, Florida
- Chesbay Distributing, in Chesapeake, Virginia
- Windy City Distributing, in Warrenville, Illinois
- Allied Beverage, in Sylmar, California
- Gold Coast Distributing, in Miami, Florida
- Golden Brands, in northern California
- High Desert Distributing, in Bakersfield, California, Lancaster, California and Victorville, California
- Monarch Distributing, in Indianapolis, Indiana
- Greenco Distributing, in Greenville, South Carolina
- Premium Distributors, of Michigan
- DET Beverages, in Nashville, Tennessee
- Capital Reyes, in Manor, Texas
- Island Distributing in Hawaii

Reyes Beverage Group features brands from Constellation Brands, MillerCoors, Boston Beer Company, Heineken Brands, the Lagunitas Brewing Company, Yuengling, and many more brands.

=== Coca-Cola ===
Reyes Holdings distributes The Coca-Cola Company brands under the wholly owned subsidiary Reyes Coca-Cola Bottling. Reyes Holdings merged a second subsidiary, Great Lakes Coca-Cola, into Reyes Coca-Cola Bottling effective January 1, 2022. Reyes Coca-Cola has 59 facilities servicing Chicago, Illinois, Northwest Indiana, Michigan, Wisconsin, southern Minnesota, California, Las Vegas, Nevada, and portions of Tennessee and Kentucky. Reyes Coca-Cola delivers over 336 million cases annually to over 105,000 customers and has over 10,700 employees.

=== Martin-Brower ===
The Martin-Brower Company, LLC (Martin Brower) is a logistics service provider delivering over 730 million cases of food and service products to over 25,000 restaurants from 77 facilities. The company serves as the largest supplier worldwide of distribution services to the McDonald's restaurant system. Martin-Brower has distribution operations in 18 countries, including the United States, Australia, Brazil, Canada, Costa Rica, France, Great Britain, Ireland, Kuwait, New Zealand, Panama, Qatar, Singapore, South Korea and the United Arab Emirates. Martin Brower also distributes to Chipotle Mexican Grill, Chick-fil-A, Panera Bread and other restaurants in select U.S. markets.

=== Others ===
Other related operations include businesses involved in transportation management, logistics management, equipment leasing, and real estate acquisition and development. Reyes Holdings owns more than 138 properties in several countries. Reyes Fleet Management maintains over 20,000 units across 30+ states making it the 6th largest fleet in the United States.
