= Nature Reviews Neurology =

- Discipline: Neurology
- Language: English
- Edited by: Ian Fyfe

Publication details
- Former name(s): Nature Clinical Practice Neurology
- History: 2005–present
- Publisher: Nature Portfolio
- Frequency: Monthly
- Impact factor: 44.711 (2021)

Standard abbreviations
- ISO 4: Nat. Rev. Neurol.

Indexing
- CODEN: NRNACP
- ISSN: 1759-4758 (print); 1759-4766 (web)
- OCLC no.: 390768520

Links
- Journal homepage; Online archive

Nature Reviews Neurology is a monthly peer-reviewed scientific journal published by Nature Portfolio. It was established in 2005 as Nature Clinical Practice Neurology, but was renamed in April 2009. It covers research developments and clinical practice in neurology. Coverage includes prevention, diagnosis and treatment of disease or impaired function of the central and peripheral nervous systems, including neurodevelopmental, neurodegenerative, and neuropsychiatric disorders. The Chief Editor is Ian Fyfe.

According to the Journal Citation Reports, the journal has a 2021 impact factor of 44.711, ranking it 2nd out of 212 journals in the category "Clinical Neurology".
