= J. Christopher Reyes =

American businessman

- Born: 1953 (age 72–73)
- Education: University of Maryland
- Occupations: Co-chairman, Reyes Holdings
- Spouse: Anne N. Reyes
- Children: 4
- Relatives: Jude Reyes (brother)

J. Christopher Reyes (born 1953) is an American billionaire businessman and the co-chairman, with his brother Jude Reyes, of Reyes Holdings, a food and beverage production and distribution company, ranked by Forbes in 2025 as the 6th largest privately held company in the US with $44 billion in annual revenue.

== Early life ==
Reyes was born in 1953, the eldest son of Joseph A. Reyes and Frances "Frannie" Marie Reyes (nee Collins) (1925-2013). He has seven brothers and one sister, M. Jude Reyes, David K. Reyes, William F. Reyes, John J. Reyes, James V. Reyes, Julie Reyes Taubman, Thomas A. Reyes, and Stephen Reyes.

Reyes earned a bachelor's degree from the University of Maryland.

== Career ==
He began his business career by purchasing a small Schlitz beer distribution business in Spartanburg, South Carolina with his brother and father. Running all aspects of the operation with his brother, the firm aggressively acquired beer distribution businesses and brands. Since 1976, Reyes Holdings has acquired more than 130 beer distribution operations. In April 1998, the firm expanded beyond beer distribution with the purchase of the Martin-Brower Company, a dedicated McDonald's distribution business operating primarily in the US and 18 international locations. In 2015, Reyes Holdings expanded into Coca-Cola production and distribution with the acquisition of Great Lakes Coca-Cola Bottling in Chicago and the Midwest. Currently Reyes Holdings runs its Coca-Cola production under Reyes Coca-Cola Bottling with operations in California, Nevada and throughout the Midwest.

== Political activity ==
A conservative, Reyes and his brother, Jude, donate significant amounts of money to political groups. In 2021, they contributed $50,000 to help stop recall efforts against California Governor Gavin Newsom. In 2019, they donated $150,000 each to Bill Daley's mayoral campaign in Chicago. Prior to that, they donated a combined $20,000 in 2015 and $160,000 in 2013 to support former Mayor of Chicago Rahm Emanuel. Reyes also donated $25,250 to former Illinois Lieutenant Governor Corinne Wood. From 1994 to 2007, he donated $80,200 to the Illinois Republican Party and the Lake County Republican Party committees. Reyes also donated $100,000 to Two Party System, Inc., a Republican PAC.

Reyes and his brother Jude spent $20.1 million in support of Republican candidates in the 2026 United States elections.

== Personal life ==
Reyes is married to Anne N. Reyes, they have four children and live in Hobe Sound, Florida. In 2010, he bought a house with 44 acres in Aspen, Colorado for $47.5 million. In 2022, he was named as the purchaser of the $36 million Driehaus property in Lake Geneva, WI.

== Philanthropy ==
Reyes is a member of the Ronald McDonald House global board of trustees.
