= BBH =

BBH may refer to:

== Businesses ==
- Baltic Beverages Holding, now owned by the Carlsberg Group
- Bartle Bogle Hegarty, a British advertising agency
- Brown Brothers Harriman & Co., an American private investment bank
- Bellevue Healthcare Trust, listed on the London Stock Exchange as BBH

== People ==
- Bruce Barrymore Halpenny, English military historian
- Byun Baek-hyun, South Korean singer and actor
- BadBoyHalo, a member of the now defunct Dream SMP server
- The Darkstalkers character Baby Bonnie Hood

== Sport ==
- Baseball Heaven, New York, US
- Brest Bretagne Handball, a French handball club
- Burgos BH, a Spanish cycling team

== Transport ==
- Brighton Beach railway station, Melbourne
- Stralsund–Barth Airport, Germany
- Buckeye Bahamas Hub, fuel terminal in The Bahamas

== Other ==
- Bradbury Hospice, a hospice in Sha Tin, Hong Kong

== See also ==
- BBHS (disambiguation)
