= Justin Stebbing =

British oncology doctor and cancer researcher

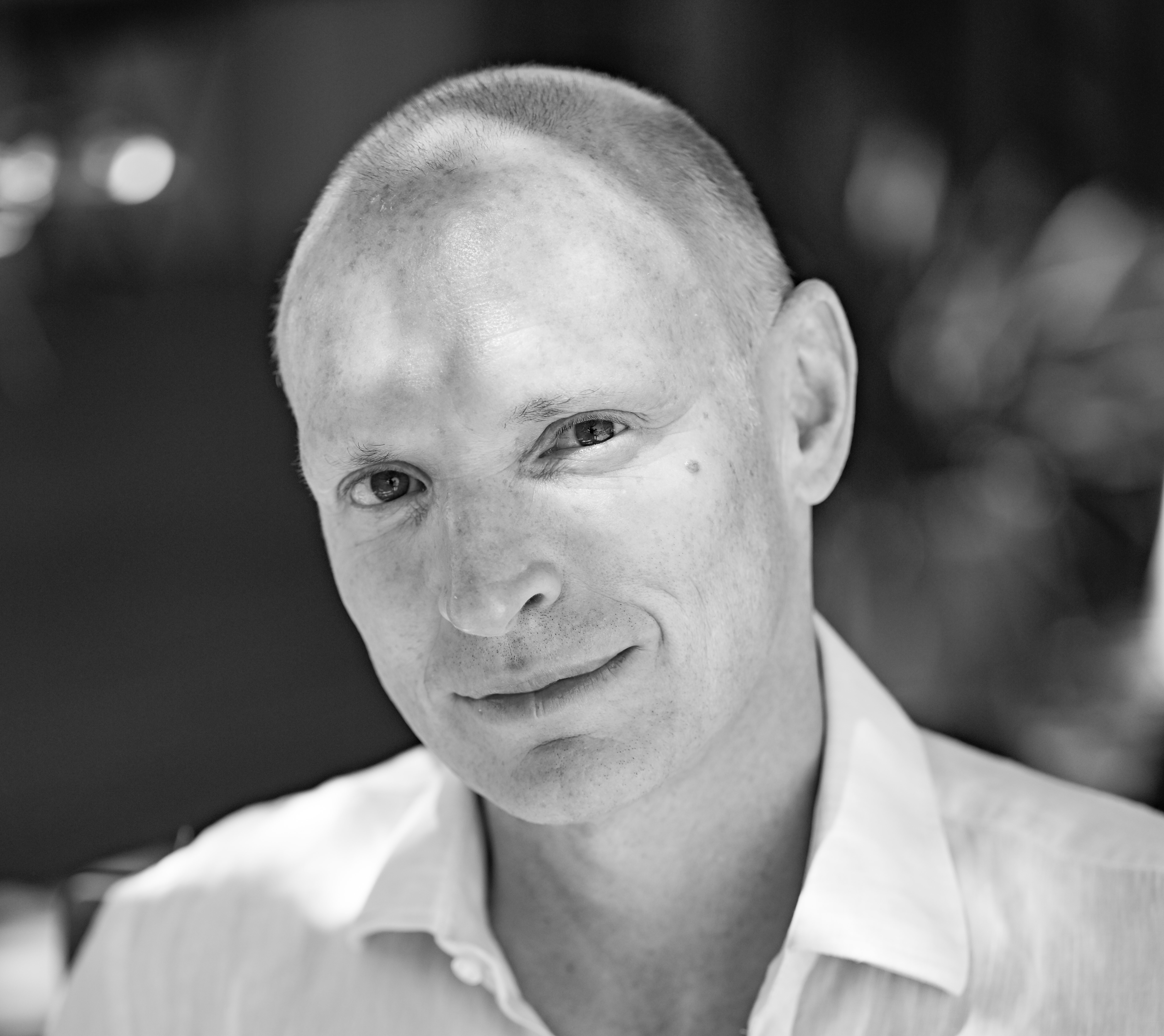
Justin Stebbing

Justin Stebbing is a British clinician-scientist specialising in oncology and cancer research. He is a professor of biomedical sciences at Anglia Ruskin University and practices with the private sector Phoenix Hospital Group in London.

Stebbing is co-Editor-in-Chief of the journal Oncogene. He is also a visiting professor of cancer medicine and oncology at Imperial College London.

== Early life and education ==
Stebbing graduated from Trinity College, Oxford. After completion of junior doctor positions in Oxford, he trained on the residency programme at The Johns Hopkins Hospital in the US, returning to London to continue his career at The Royal Marsden and then St Bartholomew's Hospitals. His PhD research investigated the interplay between the immune system and cancer including the role of viruses. In 2007, he was appointed a senior lecturer, and then in 2009 a full professor, at Imperial College London. In 2011, the National Institute for Health and Care Research awarded Stebbing its first Translational Professorship in Oncology, working on overcoming treatment resistance and targeted precision medicine approaches.

== Research career ==
Stebbing has published over 700 peer-reviewed papers and has an h-index of 90 according to Google Scholar.

=== Cancer research ===
Stebbing was an oncology professor at Imperial College London and has gained a reputation for innovative treatments.

He is co-Editor-in-Chief of the journal Oncogene.

The charity Action Against Cancer was set up to support Stebbing's work.

Stebbing's research in cancer has included work on the molecular biology of solid tumours. His group identified LMTK3 as an oncogene and therapeutic target in breast cancer. The team characterised the network of microRNAs induced by the estrogen receptor.

Stebbing has also worked on cancers caused by HIV and AIDS, including investigating immune reconstitution inflammatory syndrome in patients with Kaposi's Sarcoma.

He has undertaken extensive work on biosimilars, cheaper versions of expensive biologic drugs designed to democratise access to these.

=== COVID-19 ===
During the COVID-19 pandemic in early 2020, Stebbing used artificial intelligence to identify baricitinib as a potential drug treatment. He led studies that showed that the drug reduced mortality in COVID-19 hospitalised patients with pneumonia, which led to the drug being authorised by the US Food and Drug Administration in October 2020 as an Emergency Use Authorization at first in combination with remdesivir, then alone. Stebbing wrote a book, Witness to COVID, 2020, describing its discovery, trials, studies and approval.

Stebbing is part of a team that ran a phase 1/2 clinical trial using invariant natural killer T cells as an 'off-the-shelf' therapy in ventilated patients with acute respiratory distress syndrome (ARDS), the first time these cells have been used in the clinic.

=== Other research ===
Stebbing has worked on neurological therapies for patients with unmet medical needs who are treatment resistant or unresponsive to other existing medications.

== Clinical practice ==
Stebbing is a Fellow of the Royal College of Physicians, the American Society for Clinical Investigation and the Royal College of Pathologists.

As a clinician-scientist at Imperial College London, Stebbing practiced with the Imperial College Healthcare NHS Trust at Charing Cross Hospital and Hammersmith Hospital. He resigned his permanent position at Imperial in March 2022.

He has also practiced privately in Harley Street. Patients who experienced successful treatments in his care included Michael Parkinson and Lynda Bellingham.

As of 2024, he practices with the private Phoenix Hospital Group, where he specialises in a range of solid malignancies, including difficult cases with few conventional options.He is also working at the Lauriston Clinic in London.

=== Misconduct case ===
In 2020, Stebbing was investigated by the General Medical Council over allegations that he failed to provide adequate care to eleven patients he had cared for between 2014 and 2017. The case focused on whether Stebbing had prescribed inappropriate courses of treatment in patients whose cancers were too advanced to benefit from the treatment.

After initially denying all complaints against him, Stebbing eventually admitted 30 of the 36 charges, and was found guilty of another three by a Medical Practitioners Tribunal Service misconduct hearing. A number of Stebbing's patients and their families supported him, saying his "aggressive treatments" brought hope. However, he was found to have inappropriately treated patients given their poor prognosis, overstated benefits of treatment, failed to gain informed consent by not discussing the risks and benefits, and failed to maintain proper records.

The GMG suspended Stebbing from the UK medical register for nine months, with the disciplinary panel finding he had "breached the very core of the Hippocratic oath." However, he was not struck off, after the panel considered mitigating factors and an "unprecedented number" of testimonials to his clinical competence from former patients, family members of patients, and colleagues, finding it in the public interest to allow Stebbing to return to practice "as soon as possible".

== Other work ==
Stebbing has combined his medical career with investing, and he has worked with Atticus Capital, Lansdowne Partners, Vitruvian Partners and Chaired the Board of BB Healthcare Trust. He is senior oncology advisor to Clinical ink, chairs the ZephyrAI scientific advisory board, and is chair of the boards of Etira and Portage Biotech. He is senior VP of clinical strategy and innovation at Graviton Biosciences focusing on new treatments for fibrosis, inflammation and metabolism based on selective targeting of ROCK2.
