= Sister journal =

In academic publishing, a sister journal or companion journal is a newer academic journal affiliated with an established journal in the same field. These journals sometimes follow the "cascade or transfer model," whereby they publish academic papers rejected by the older, more prestigious journal in the publisher's portfolio. While the original journal often requires a subscription to read, these journals tend to be open access. This business model allows publishers to recoup the editorial costs expended in the peer review process undergone at the original journal that ultimately resulted in a rejection and monetise the scholar's work by means of an article processing charge. Scholars, in turn, benefit, as they must only undergo one peer review process. A sister journal is not to be confused with a mirror journal, which is an open access journal that runs parallel to an established subscription journal, with which it often shares a similar name and largely identical editorial team.

== Examples ==
- JAAD Case Reports is a sister journal to the Journal of the American Academy of Dermatology, both published by Elsevier.
- Translational Psychiatry is a sister journal to Molecular Psychiatry.
- In 2001, BMJ Publishing Group launched BMJ USA and the Western Journal of Medicine as sister journals to the BMJ.
- Science Translational Medicine is a sister journal to Science.
- As of 1995, Nature's sister journals included Nature Medicine, Nature Structural Biology and Nature Genetics.
- Oncogenesis is a sister journal to Oncogene.
- Stem Cells Translational Medicine is a sister journal to the Wiley-Blackwell journal Stem Cells.
