= Belmopan Museum =

- Location in Belize
- Location: Culvert Road, Belmopan, Belize
- Coordinates: 17.246284°N 88.772163°W
- Type: National archaeology museum
- Collections: Mayan vases
- Owner: NICH Institute of Archaeology

The Belmopan Museum is a long-planned national museum in Belmopan, the capital of Belize. The originally planned building was to be an ambitious state-of-the-art center for displaying information about the environment and society of Belize, including an exhibit of Mayan archaeology. The project was cancelled, but recently there have been plans to revive it. The Institute of Archaeology's library and collection of Mayan artifacts has been sporadically open to the public in the Archaeology Museum and Research Centre, Belmopan since the late 1990s.

== First plan ==
Belmopan has officially been capital of the country since 1970 after Belize City was wrecked by a hurricane. However, Belize City was quickly restored, and most of the government departments remained there. The Catalan-born Joan Duran raised the question of building a national museum in Belmopan with the minister of education a week after Belize gained independence in 1981. He was encouraged by the People's United Party government to develop the concept with Mexican and Cuban colleagues. The museum was to be primarily devoted to audio-visual displays while a separate building would house the collection. The project was abandoned in 1984 when the People's United Party lost the election.

During the administration of the United Democratic Party from 1984 to 1989 the task of planning for a national museum and botanical garden was given to a British consulting firm. A Creole archaeologist was trained in London to be the museum's future director, and was made head of the department of museums. The People's United Party regained office in the 1989 election, and Duran was again placed in charge of planning for the new Museum of Belize, while Duran's wife was put in charge of the state's archaeological collection.

The museum building for the new Museum of Belize in Belmopan, designed by Mexican architects, was to have covered 4,500 metres (14,800 ft) in a 50 acres (20 ha) park. It was to have been a 2-story building around a glass-roofed patio, connected to an outdoor amphitheatre with 600 seats. The museum would have two main exhibit spaces on the ground floor, called "lungs", one about society and the other about the environment. Under the dome it would hold the most traditional exhibit, the Ancient Maya Gallery, planned by specialists from the Royal Ontario Museum. The exhibit would have a glass floor over a reconstruction of a half-excavated Mayan tomb. In June 1993 the plans for the museum were settled and construction of the museum building had begun. It was to be the largest building in the country, equipped with the latest technology to showcase Belize. A national election defeated the government and the plans were abandoned.

== Institute of Archaeology collection ==
The Belize Department of Archaeology was created in 1957 with a staff of one person. As of 1996 the Belmopan Vault in the Department of Archaeology held some of the archaeological remains of the country. Most of the display consisted of ceramic vessels from across Belize. They were packed tightly and did not have labels. A group of 24 vases salvaged in 1973 from the Hokeb Ha cave in Toledo, southern Belize, was the most interesting part of the collection. At that time the vault was open in the afternoon on Monday, Wednesday and Friday by prior appointment. A 1997 guide said that the Archaeology Vault in Belmopan, which had been open for visitors to see a large collection of Mayan artifacts, had been closed for lack of funding. The Department of Archaeology had absorbed the Department of Museums, and plans to replace the Archaeology Vault with a National Museum of Belize were uncertain. The guide noted rumors that some of the valuable artifacts might have been sold abroad, and their absence from the collection would be embarrassing.

In August 2003 the National Institute of Culture and History (NICH) was created, and the former Department of Archaeology became the Institute of Archaeology within the NICH. The Institute of Archaeology manages all of Belize's archaeological and cultural resources. It is located in the Archaeology Museum and Research Centre, Culvert Road, Belmopan. As of 2004 the Institute of Archaeology gave tours of their collection in Belmopan. The institute also had an impressive research library. The Archaeology Museum contains a selection of artifacts and relics from the past. Most of the building is used for research and to store the library collections, rather than exhibiting objects. However, the museum presents an interesting collection of pottery and tools.

== Later plans ==
A 2006 guide said the archaeological collection in the Belmopan Museum was interesting, but the museum was closed for renovations. It was due to open again in January 2007. The Department of Archaeology could provide leaflets and brochures about the museum. The building plot for the new museum was sold just before the 2008 elections. In November 2014 the Belmopan Business Network said it was interested in reviving the Belmopan Museum. In late 2014 a contract was signed to build a new Museum of Belize in Belmopan, replacing the museum opened in 2002 in Belize City. The new museum was to form the center of the National Institute of Culture and History (NICH) network of cultural and heritage sites.

== Sources ==
- About Us, Institute of Archaeology, archived from the original on 2017-05-02
- "Belize Archaeology Museum", Caribya!, IIWINC, archived from the original on 2017-04-09
- Contact Us, Institute of Archaeology
- Fullman, Joseph; Mainwood, Nicola (1 December 2006), Belize, New Holland Publishers, ISBN 978-1-86011-341-3
- Kelly, Joyce (1996), An Archaeological Guide to Northern Central America: Belize, Guatemala, Honduras, and El Salvador, University of Oklahoma Press, ISBN 978-0-8061-2861-0
- McKillop, Heather Irene (2004), The Ancient Maya: New Perspectives, ABC-CLIO, ISBN 978-1-57607-696-5
- National Museum of Belize, Lord Cultural Resources
- Pariser, Harry S. (November 1997), Explore Belize, Harry S. Pariser, ISBN 978-1-55650-785-4
- Price, Richard; Price, Sally (March 1995), "Executing Culture: Musée, Museo, Museum", American Anthropologist, 97 (1): 97, doi:10.1525/aa.1995.97.1.02a00710, JSTOR 682382
- Smith, Richard (31 October 2014), Belize Business Network promotes Belmopan as Tourism Center
- "When Will Belize Have A National Museum?", 7 News Belize, Naturalight Productions, 27 January 2015
