= Oncogene (journal) =

- Discipline: Cancer biology
- Language: English
- Edited by: George Miller; Justin Stebbing

Publication details
- History: 1987-present
- Publisher: Springer Nature
- Frequency: 50/year
- Impact factor: 9.1 (2025)

Standard abbreviations
- ISO 4: Oncogene

Indexing
- CODEN: ONCNES
- ISSN: 0950-9232 (print); 1476-5594 (web)
- OCLC no.: 15797680

Links
- Journal homepage; Online archive

Oncogene is a peer-reviewed scientific journal published by the Nature Portfolio addressing cancer cell genetics and the structure and function of oncogenes. The journal has editorial office in London, England. The journal was established in 1987. An open access online-only sister journal, Oncogenesis, was established in 2012 by Douglas R. Green, who was then Oncogene's editor-in-chief.

Oncogene received a 2025 impact factor of 9.1.

The current editors-in-chief are Georgios Giamas and Joseph Kissil.

== Abstracting and indexing ==
The journal is abstracted and indexed in: EBSCO Discovery Service, Summon by ProQuest, BIOSIS, Current Contents/Life Sciences, Science Citation Index Expanded, SCOPUS, EBSCO Academic Search, EBSCO Advanced Placement Source, EBSCO Agriculture Plus, EBSCO Biomedical Reference Collection, EBSCO Science & Technology Collection, EBSCO STM Source, EBSCO TOC Premier, and INIS Atomindex.

== See also ==
- Springer Nature
