= Douglas Kamerow =

American physician

- Education: Harvard College; University of Rochester School of Medicine; Johns Hopkins Bloomberg School of Public Health
- Occupations: Physician, medical journal editor

Douglas B. Kamerow is an American family physician, medical researcher, and medical journal editor. He is a professor of family medicine at Georgetown University and Senior Scholar in Residence at the Robert Graham Center. He was previously an associate editor and regular columnist for the BMJ.

== Personal life ==
Kamerow was educated at Harvard College, the University of Rochester School of Medicine, and the Johns Hopkins Bloomberg School of Public Health. He worked for the United States Public Health Service from 1979 to 2001, where he directed the Agency for Healthcare Research and Quality's Center for Practice and Technology Assessment. He also led the United States Preventive Services Task Force, the National Guideline Clearinghouse, and became an assistant Surgeon General. In 2001, he retired from the Public Health Service to begin working at RTI International, where he was a chief scientist for twelve years. In 2003, he became the editor-in-chief of BMJ USA. After BMJ USA ceased publication in 2005, Kamerow remained the BMJ's United States editor. He is currently a Visiting Scholar in Residence at the Robert Graham Center, a health policy research group affiliated with the American Academy of Family Physicians.
