= BBHS =

BBHS may refer to:

Australia

- Blacktown Boys High School, Sydney

Belize

- Belmopan Baptist High School, Belmopan

Canada

- Baron Byng High School, Montreal, Quebec

India

- Baldwin Boys High School, Bangalore

Nigeria

- Baptist Boys' High School, Abeokuta, Ogun State

Sweden

- Borås på Bollebygd Högskola, Borås

United Kingdom

- The Benjamin Britten High School, Lowestoft, Suffolk, England
- Bell Baxter High School, Cupar, Fife, Scotland

United States

- Benjamin Bosse High School, Evansville, Indiana
- Bishop Blanchet High School, Seattle, Washington
- Bishop Borgess High School, Redford, Michigan
- Bishop Brady High School, Concord, New Hampshire
- Bishop Brossart High School, Alexandria, Kentucky
- Bishop Byrne High School (Memphis, Tennessee)
- Bishop Byrne High School (Texas) - Port Arthur, Texas
- Blind Brook High School, Rye Brook, New York
