= Belmopan Public Library =

Public library in Belize

Coordinates: 17.25015234192357°N 88.76546469588996°W

The Belmopan Public Library located on Mot Mot Ln, Belmopan, the capital city of Belize, was inaugurated on 24 August 1970.

== History ==
The process of constructing a local library began after Hurricane Hattie, in 1961, devastated the previous capital, Belize City, located on the east coast of Belize. In the wake of this destruction the government of Belize agreed to relocate the capital further inland and it was during this time in 1961 that Belmopan was constructed from nothing but a thinly populated area of preserved bush otherwise known as jungle. During the construction of the new capital the local residents identified a need for a public library and the British Overseas Development Mission approved the funding of the Belmopan Public Library. The Honorable Santiago Perdomo, Ministry of Education, and Leo Bradley, Chief Librarian finally inaugurated the building in 1971 and the same building has been the location of the Belmopan Public Library for the last 41 years.
