= BMJ USA =

Defunct medical journal

- Discipline: Medicine
- Language: English
- Edited by: Douglas Kamerow

Publication details
- History: 2001–2005
- Publisher: BMJ Group (United States)
- Frequency: Monthly

Standard abbreviations
- ISO 4: BMJ USA

Indexing
- ISSN: 1531-5177
- LCCN: 00215709
- OCLC no.: 44923590

Links
- Journal homepage

BMJ USA: Primary Care Medicine for the American Physician was a monthly peer-reviewed medical journal published by the BMJ Group as a sister journal to the BMJ. It was intended to publish material specifically relevant to readers in the United States. It was established in 2001 and was discontinued permanently in 2005.

== History ==
BMJ USA was launched in February 2001 by the BMJ Group, in conjunction with the Clifton, New Jersey–based publishing company Clinicians Group. The founding editor-in-chief of the journal was Ronald Davis, who was also the North American editor for the BMJ at the time. Its original plan was to publish mostly articles from the BMJ that were particularly relevant to American primary care physicians, as well as similar articles from fellow BMJ Group journals such as Heart and Gut. In an editorial in the inaugural issue, Davis and then-editor-in-chief of the BMJ Richard Smith wrote, "You will see very little etiologic or basic science research in the BMJ and BMJ USA. You will, instead, find papers on the common diseases of primary care such as asthma, depression, and hypertension and diabetes."

Beginning when BMJ USA was first established, monthly issues were sent to 100,000 primary care doctors in the United States. The journal generally republished articles from the BMJ about two months after they were originally published. In addition to articles that had already been published in other BMJ Group journals, each issue contained an editorial by an American author, as well as a number of papers submitted specifically for publication in BMJ USA. In 2002, it became available online. In September 2002, Steven Woolf (Virginia Commonwealth University) became the new editor-in-chief of the journal, remaining in this position until 1 July 2003, when he was replaced by former Assistant Surgeon General of the United States Douglas Kamerow.

The 51st and final issue of the journal was published in December 2005. In an editorial announcing the ending of BMJ USA, Kamerow and editor-in-chief of the BMJ Fiona Godlee stated that, despite its popularity, the journal "...has fallen victim to the widespread downturn in US pharmaceutical advertising and has become financially unsustainable for the BMJ Publishing Group." BMJ USA contained more advertisements than the BMJ, and almost all of its subscriptions were "controlled", or paid for by pharmaceutical companies. After BMJ USA shuttered, Kamerow, who had been its editor-in-chief, transitioned to the role of the BMJ's US editor. In January 2006, the BMJ started "US Highlights", an online-only feature intended to emulate BMJ USA by compiling articles from the BMJ that were deemed especially relevant to an American audience.
