= Belmopan =

Capital city of Belize

- Capital city
- City of Belmopan
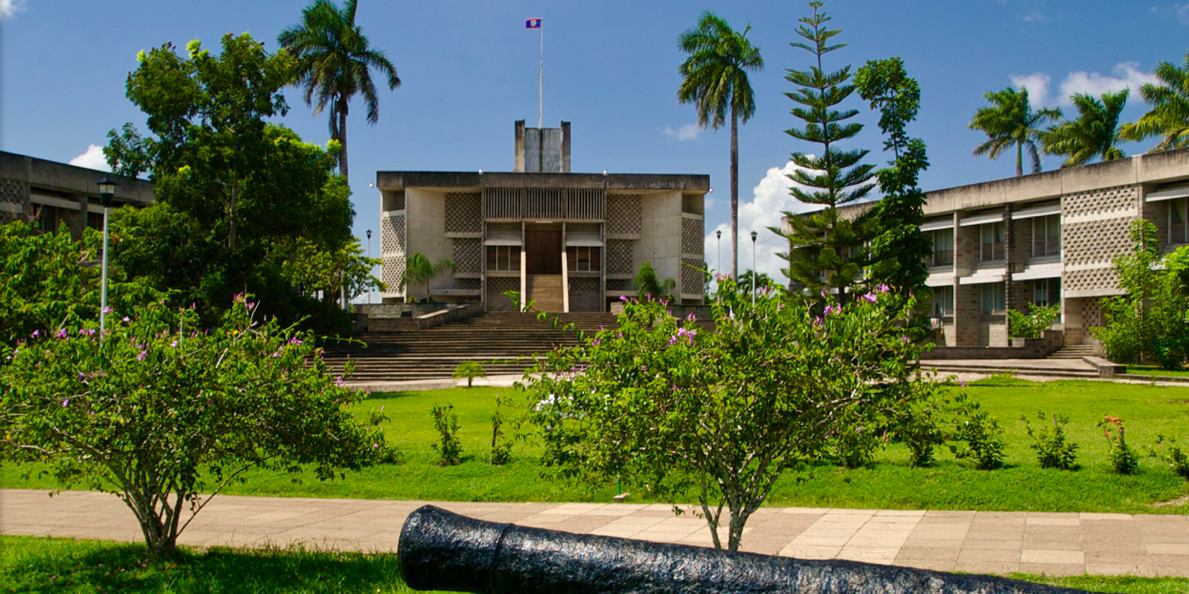
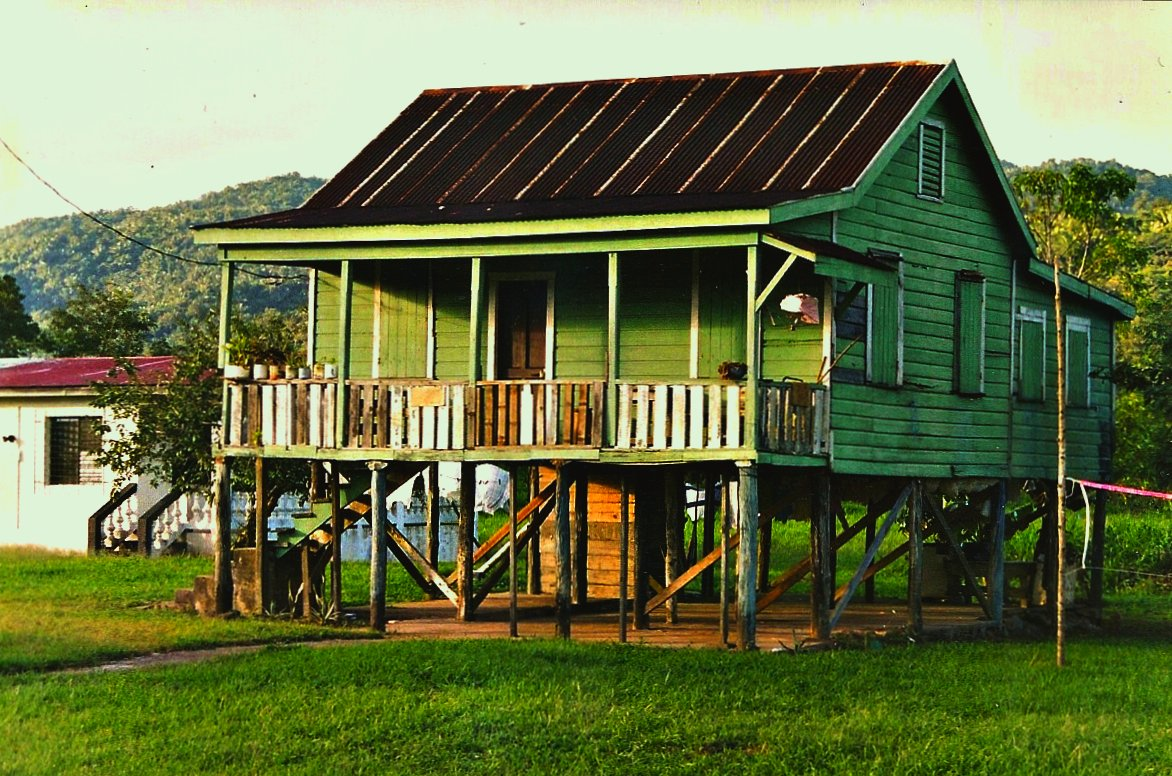
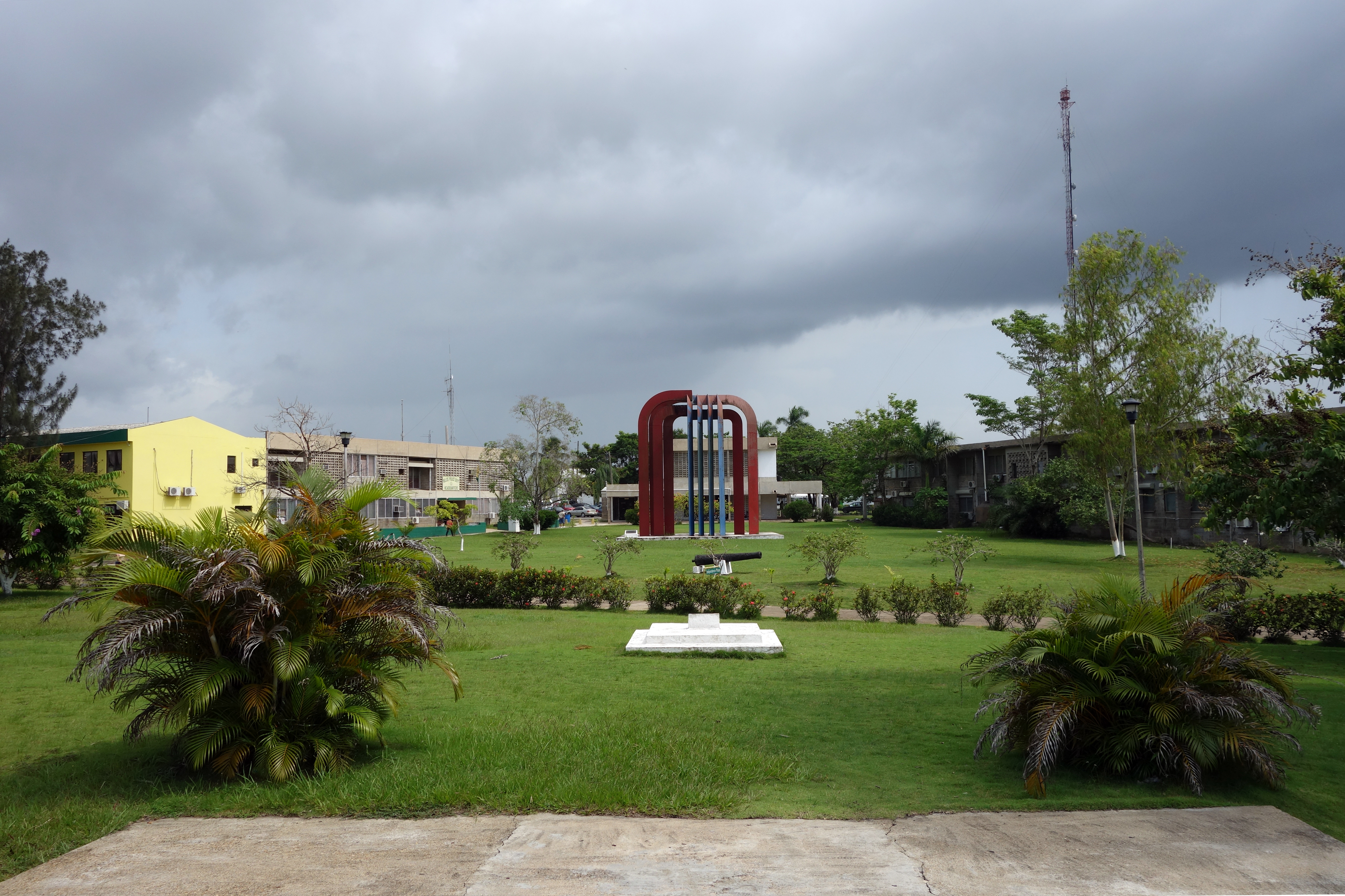
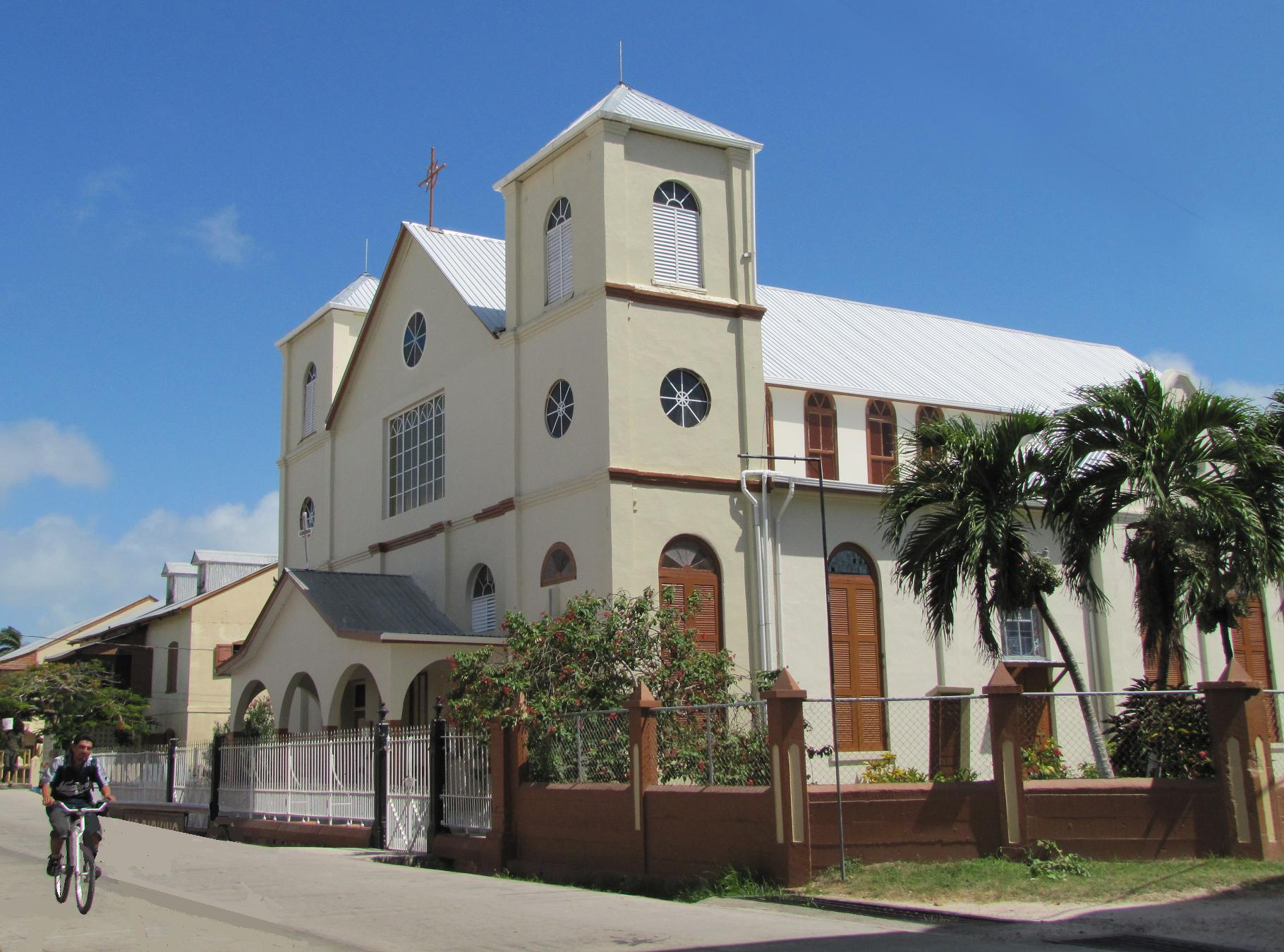
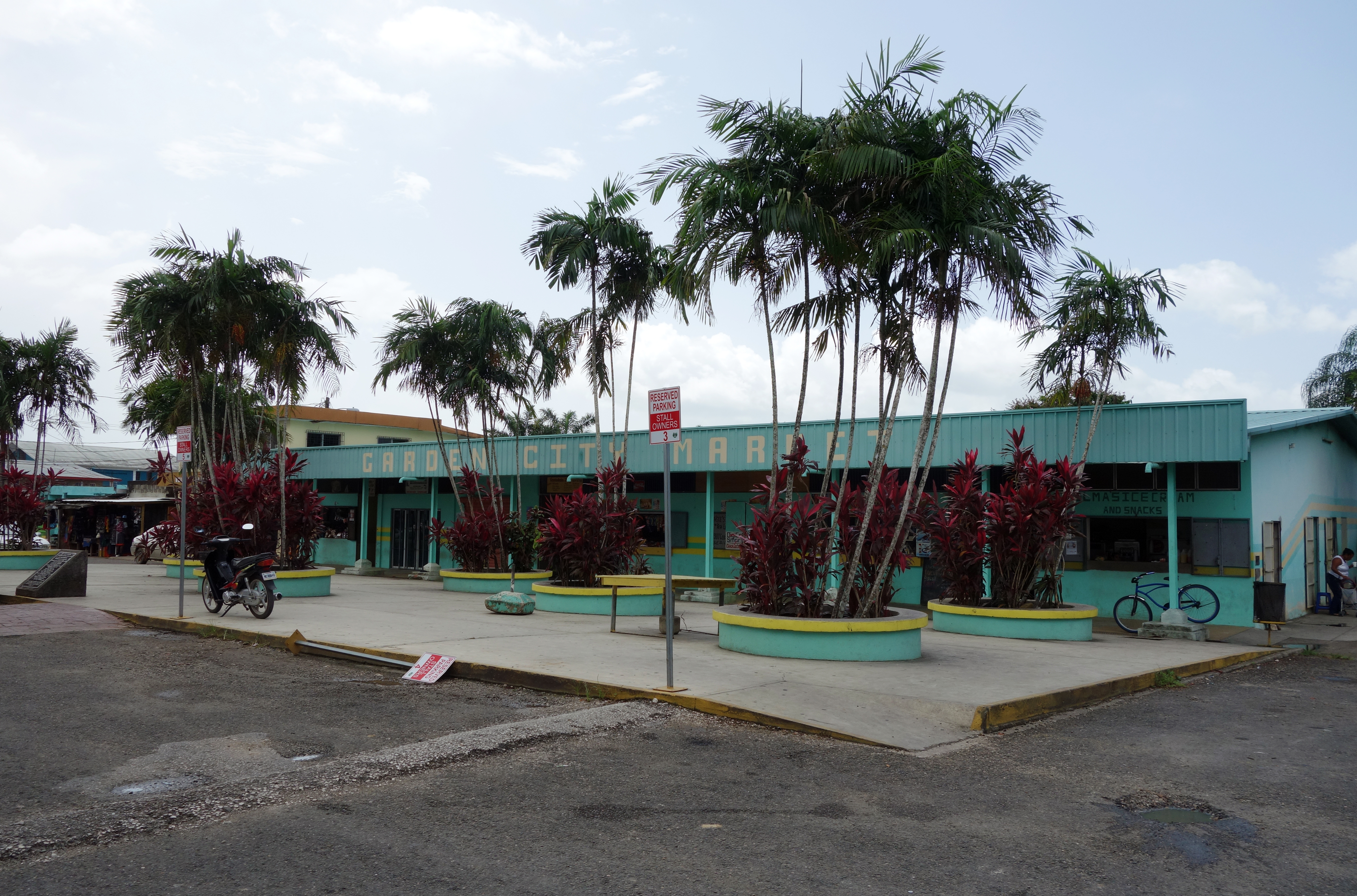
- Belize National Assembly Traditional houses in the city Independence Plaza Holy Redeemer Cathedral Belmopan market

- Flag
- Nicknames: The Garden City, 'Pan
- Motto: City of Promise
- Location within Belize Location within Central America Location within North America
- Coordinates: 17°15′08″N 88°45′50″W
- Country: Belize
- District: Cayo
- Constituency: Belmopan
- Foundation: 1 August 1970
- Incorporation: 2000

Government
  - Mayor: Pablo Cawich (PUP)

Area
  - Total: 32.78 km^{2} (12.66 sq mi)
- Elevation: 76 m (249 ft)

Population (2024 estimate)
  - Total: 27,870
  - Rank: 2nd
  - Density: 850/km^{2} (2,200/sq mi)
- Time zone: UTC-06:00 (CST)
- Area code: 501 +8
- Climate: Am

Belmopan (/ˌbɛlmoʊˈpɑːn/) is the capital city of Belize. Its population in 2022 was 20,754. Belmopan is the smallest capital city in the continental Americas (by population) and the second-largest settlement in Belize, behind the former capital Belize City. Founded as a planned community in 1970, it is one of the newest national capital cities in the world. Since 2000, Belmopan has been one of two settlements in Belize to hold official city status, the other being Belize City.

Belmopan is located in Cayo District at an altitude of 76 metres (249 feet) above sea level. Belmopan was constructed just to the east of the Belize River, 80 km (50 mi) inland from the former capital, the port of Belize City, after that city's near destruction by Hurricane Hattie in 1961. The government was moved to Belmopan in 1970. Its National Assembly Building is designed to resemble a Pre-Columbian Maya temple.

== History ==
After Hurricane Hattie in 1961 destroyed approximately 75% of the houses and business places in low-lying and coastal Belize City, the government proposed to encourage and promote the building of a new capital city. This new capital would be on better terrain, would entail no costly reclamation of land, and would provide for an industrial area. In 1962, a committee chose the site now known as Belmopan, 82 kilometres (51 mi) southwest of the old capital of Belize City.

Since Belize was a British colony (known as British Honduras) in 1964, Premier George Cadle Price led a delegation to London to seek funds to finance the new capital. Although they were not ready to commit to funding such a large project, the British government showed interest due to the logic of locating the capital on high ground safe from storm surges. To encourage financial commitment from the British government, Premier Price and the People's United Party government invited Anthony Greenwood, Secretary of State for the Commonwealth and Colonies, to visit Belize. One of the highlights of this visit was the unveiling of a monument at mile 49 on the Western Highway. The monument records that Lord Greenwood dedicated the site for the new capital on 9 October 1965.

The name chosen for the new capital, Belmopan, is derived from the union of two words: "Belize", the name of the longest river in the country, and "Mopan", one of the rivers in this area, which empties into the Belize River. The initial estimated cost for building this new city was 40 million Belize dollars (US$20.5 million). Only 20 million Belize dollars (US$10 million) were available, but the momentum was not to be lost.

In 1967, work began; the first phase of the new city was completed in 1970 at a cost of 24 million Belize dollars (US$12 million). From 1970 to 2000 the administration of Belmopan was managed by the Reconstruction and Development Corporation, known as "Recondev." Recondev was vested with the power and authority to provide, or cause to be provided, the municipal functions necessary for the smooth running of the city's business and infrastructure.

There was a reluctance initially amongst foreign governments to relocate their embassies to Belmopan as there was some doubt as to whether the new inland city would truly become the functioning capital. The British High Commission opened in 1981 when British Honduras became independent as Belize, moving to its current location in 1984. In February 2005, the United States government began construction of its embassy's chancery in Belmopan, officially opening on 11 December 2006. Mexico, Brazil, Costa Rica, El Salvador, and Venezuela also have embassies in Belmopan, while Ecuador, Chile, and the Dominican Republic are represented by consulates. However, with four embassies and 29 consulates the former capital of Belize City still has most of the country's foreign diplomatic community.

== Design ==
The city layout centers around the Ring Road which is just under 4 km (2.5 miles) in circumference. The majority of government buildings are situated either within or around the Ring Road, and a large area within the Ring Road is also given to parkland.

The National Assembly Building is the focal point of the city's design, with the grey stone architecture and broad steps designed to resemble a Mayan temple, reflecting the nation's cultural heritage.

The original buildings were designed with extensive ventilation to accommodate the tropical climate leading to a pock-marked effect on the buildings' walls.

== Geography ==
Belmopan is 50 miles (80 km) inland from the Caribbean Sea and 76 meters (249 feet) above sea level, located near the Belize River Valley with a view of the Mountain Pine Ridge foothills. The city is off the Hummingbird Highway. Two and a half hours south of Belmopan by road is the Cockscomb Basin Wildlife Sanctuary.

=== Climate ===
Belmopan features a tropical monsoon climate (Am) under the Köppen climate classification. The city has a lengthy wet season that runs from May through January and a short dry season covering the remaining three months. As is the characteristic of many cities with a tropical monsoon climate, Belmopan sees some rainfall during its dry season. March and April are Belmopan's driest months with roughly 45 millimetres or 1.8 inches of rainfall observed on average during those months. As with Belize City, these are somewhat unusual months for a city with a tropical monsoon climate to have its driest months of the year. Typically the driest month for a city with this climate type is the month after the winter solstice, which in Belmopan would be January. Average monthly temperatures are somewhat constant throughout the course of the year, ranging from 23 to 28 °C (73.4 to 82.4 °F).

Climate data for Belmopan (1991–2020)
Month	Jan	Feb	Mar	Apr	May	Jun	Jul	Aug	Sep	Oct	Nov	Dec	Year
Mean daily maximum °C (°F)	28.2 (82.8)	29.7 (85.5)	31.2 (88.2)	33.5 (92.3)	34.1 (93.4)	32.7 (90.9)	32.2 (90.0)	32.6 (90.7)	32.5 (90.5)	31.2 (88.2)	29.4 (84.9)	28.6 (83.5)	31.3 (88.3)
Daily mean °C (°F)	23.7 (74.7)	24.4 (75.9)	25.5 (77.9)	27.6 (81.7)	28.6 (83.5)	28.3 (82.9)	27.7 (81.9)	27.9 (82.2)	27.9 (82.2)	26.8 (80.2)	25.1 (77.2)	24.2 (75.6)	26.5 (79.7)
Mean daily minimum °C (°F)	19.1 (66.4)	19.2 (66.6)	19.8 (67.6)	21.7 (71.1)	23.1 (73.6)	23.8 (74.8)	23.3 (73.9)	23.2 (73.8)	23.2 (73.8)	22.5 (72.5)	20.7 (69.3)	19.8 (67.6)	21.6 (70.9)
Average rainfall mm (inches)	135.2 (5.32)	51.3 (2.02)	48.5 (1.91)	41.4 (1.63)	119.3 (4.70)	259.9 (10.23)	245.3 (9.66)	226.1 (8.90)	221.8 (8.73)	244.2 (9.61)	201.9 (7.95)	134.9 (5.31)	1,929.8 (75.97)
Average rainy days (≥ 1.0 mm)	11	6	5	3	7	14	16	14	15	14	13	13	131
Mean monthly sunshine hours	170.5	189.3	241.8	255.0	248.0	189.0	201.5	207.7	171.0	182.9	165.0	150.0	2,371.7
Mean daily sunshine hours	5.5	6.7	7.8	8.5	8.0	6.3	6.5	6.7	5.7	5.9	5.5	5.0	6.5
Source: National Meteorological Service of Belize (sun 1981–2010)

== Educational institutions ==
The city of Belmopan has three pre-schools, four primary schools and four secondary schools as well as a modern Regional Language Centre (RLC) on the central campus of the University of Belize, where students from neighbouring Spanish-speaking countries come to study English. University of Belize's campus in Belmopan has the following colleges: Education and Arts, Management and Social Sciences, Science and Technology, and Nursing and Allied Health. The church/state system prevails in Belizean education, especially where pre-school, primary and secondary school education is concerned, and nearly all schools in Belmopan are sustained by churches.

International schools:

- QSI International School of Belize

Secondary schools:

- Belmopan Baptist High School
- Belmopan Comprehensive High School
- Methodist High School
- Our Lady of Guadalupe High School

Local missionaries and non-profit organizations also provide practical educational opportunities for Belizeans.

== Demographics ==
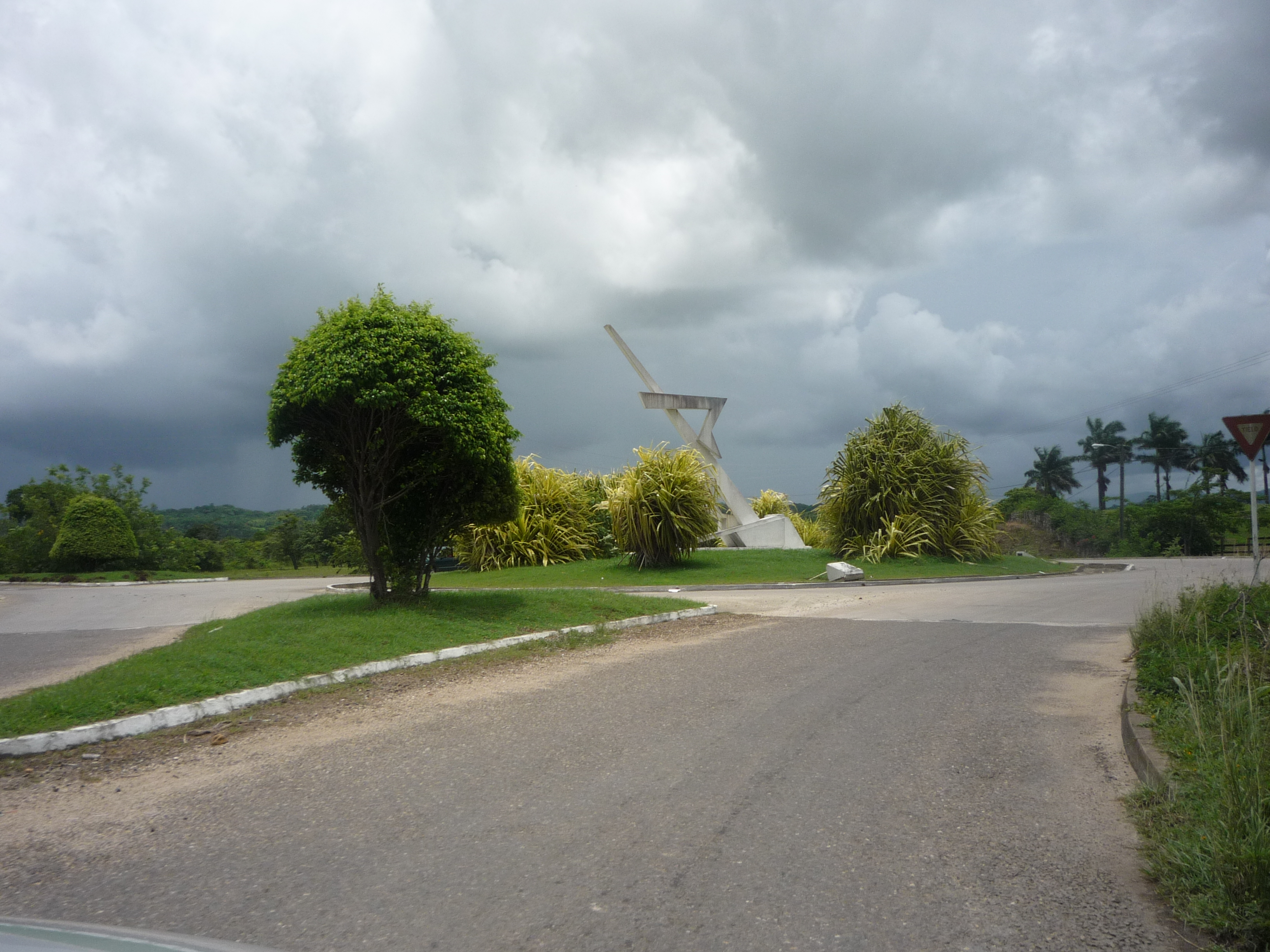
Belmopan Regional Language Center Monument

The population of Belmopan proper (20,754 people as of 2022) is of various ethnicities, including Kriols, Garifuna, Mestizo, Maya, and recent immigrants from Asian countries such as China and Taiwan.

== Culture ==
=== Local and regional events ===
Some of Belmopan's noteworthy events include presentations by the Belmopan Choral Society, the Festival of Arts for school children, and National Day activities.

The University of Belize's Black Jaguars squad has won two national championships playing out of Belmopan. Nearby communities including Roaring Creek, Camalote, Esperanza, and Georgeville play a softball tournament in the early part of the year.

=== Social and community activities ===
The City Council promotes Belmopan as "The Garden City." A Crime prevention Initiative has recently been introduced by the council in conjunction with the Belize Police Department, which introduced a Special Constable/Community Policing Programme. The council cooperates with social organizations like the Lions Club, the Belize Scout Association, Rotary International, and other NGOs. Social and cultural events and meetings of community groups are frequently held at the George Price Centre.

=== Museums ===
Museums and galleries in the city include the planned Belmopan Museum. Similar institutions include the Belize Archives and Records Service and the National Heritage Library.

== Economy ==
=== Government ===
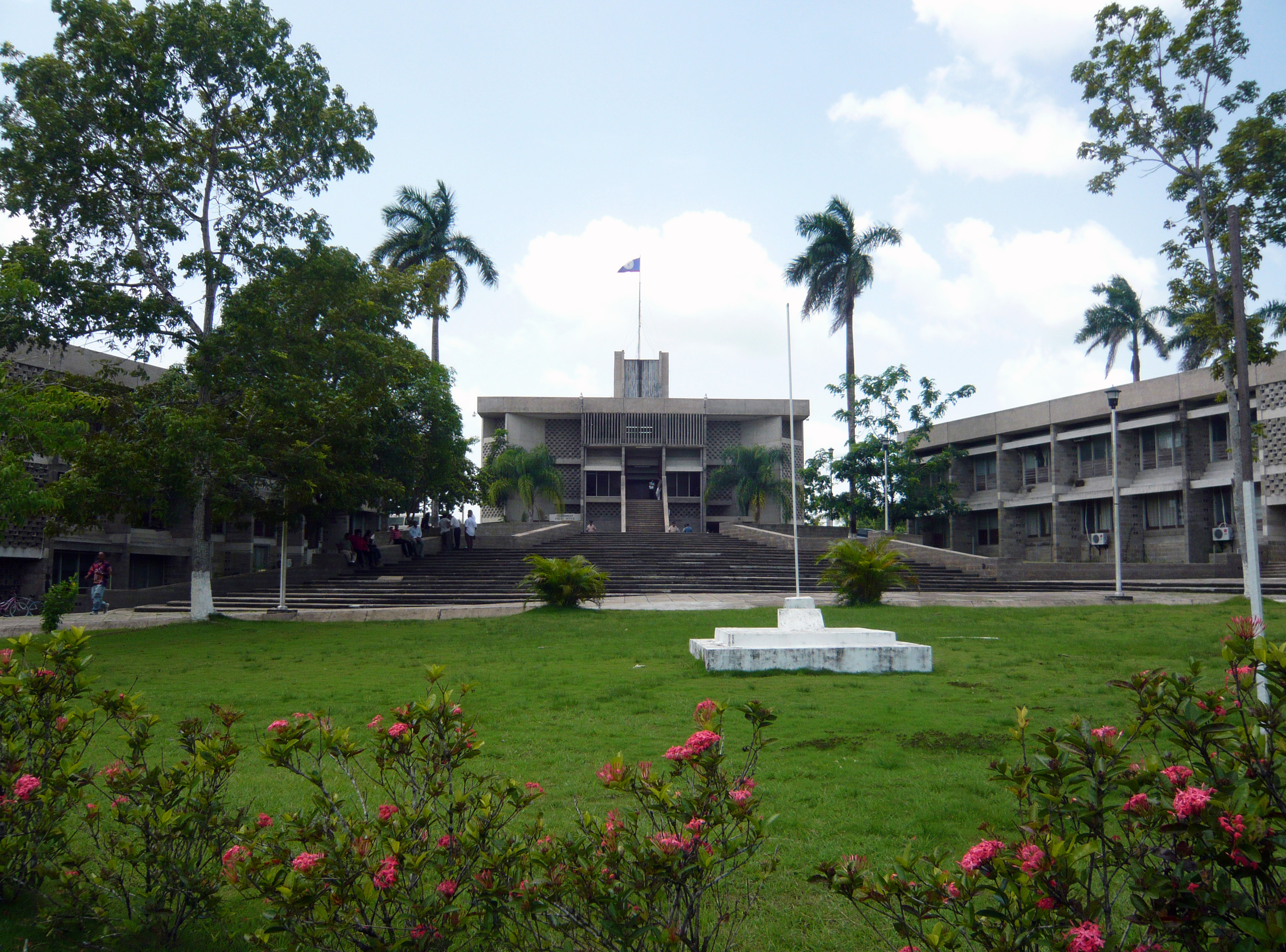
Belmopan Parliament Building

At its inception and afterward, Belmopan was governed by the corporation RECONDEV (Reconstruction and Development Corporation), which answered to the government.

Residents of Belmopan voted in a referendum in 1999 to switch to direct election of a city council. In 2000, Belmopan was incorporated as a city and held its first City Council election. Anthony Chanona of the People's United Party was elected mayor with a six-man slate, and reelected in 2003. Following the People's Party municipal victory of 2020, the mayor of Belmopan is Sharon Palacio.

As Belmopan is the seat of government, many of its inhabitants work for the national government in administrative or technical roles. Many are based in the large cluster of government buildings around the National Assembly building.

=== Commercial ===
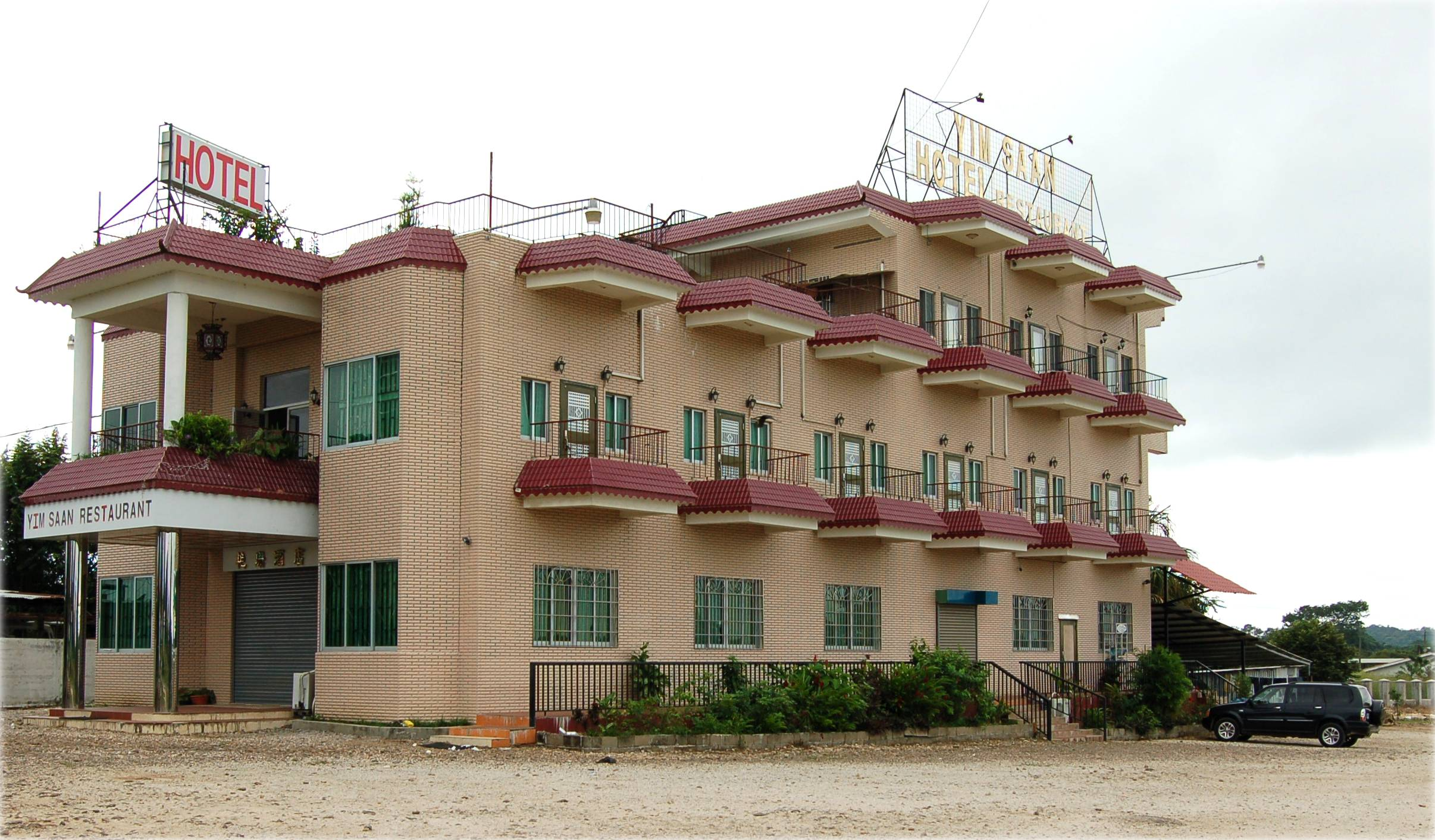
Largest Chinese restaurant in Belmopan

Belmopan has approximately 589 business establishments (the 1997 census revealed the presence of 373). Five international banks are in the city, as are several local financial institutions. A bus terminal and market complex were constructed in 2003.

=== Industrial ===
Within the zoning regulations, Belmopan has set aside approximately 200 acres (81 ha) of land made up mostly of one-acre (4,000 m^{2}) parcels in city limits. While there is very little industrial activity at present, the council has embarked on a scheme to attract local and foreign investment to the city. Plans are underway to create a 100 acres (40 ha) industrial park close to the municipal airstrip, a paved 1,100-metre strip with no control tower or hangars.

== Transportation ==
=== Air ===
Belmopan is served by Hector Silva Airstrip, a domestic airport located in the northwest of the city. Currently (April 2024), there are, however, no scheduled services to Belmopan anymore. The closest city served by scheduled flights is Belize City, 79km away, harbouring both Philip S. W. Goldson International Airport, the country's only international airport, and the domestic Sir Barry Bowen Municipal Airport.

== See also ==
- Belmopan Public Library
