= Oncogenesis (journal) =

- Discipline: Oncology
- Language: English
- Edited by: Jan Paul Medema

Publication details
- History: 2012–present
- Publisher: Springer Nature
- Frequency: Weekly
- Open access: Yes
- Impact factor: 6.4 (2024)

Standard abbreviations
- ISO 4: Oncogenesis

Indexing
- ISSN: 2157-9024
- OCLC no.: 958712217

Links
- Journal homepage; Online

Oncogenesis is a peer-reviewed open access medical journal covering the molecular biology of cancer. It was established in 2012 by Douglas R. Green as a sister journal to Oncogene, of which Green was then editor-in-chief. New articles are published exclusively online by Springer Nature on a weekly basis. The editor-in-chief is Jan Paul Medema (University of Amsterdam). According to the Journal Citation Reports, the journal has a 2020 impact factor of 7.485, ranking it 40th out of 242 journals in the category "Oncology".
