= Belmopan Baptist High School =

Coordinates: 17.27006°N 88.78878°W

Belmopan Baptist High School (BBHS) is a Baptist Christian secondary school in Belmopan, Belize which receives some funding from the Belizean government.

It was established, with three full-time teachers, one part-time teacher, and seven students, in the Scarborough Centre campus on September 28, 1998. Its first graduation was in June 2002. It moved to the current Banana Bank campus, on 25 acres (10 ha) of land, in 2002–2003. This campus includes a two-story school building. As of 2019 it had about 300 students.
