= LMTK3 =

Protein-coding gene in the species Homo sapiens

Identifiers
- Aliases: LMTK3, LMR3, PPP1R101, TYKLM3, lemur tyrosine kinase 3
- External IDs: MGI: 3039582; GeneCards: LMTK3
Enzyme activity
EC #	BRENDA	ExPASy	KEGG	MetaCyc
2.7.11.1	↗	↗	↗	↗

Gene location (Human)
Chr.	Chromosome 19 (human)
Band	19q13.33	Start	48,485,271 bp
Band	19q13.33	End	48,513,935 bp

Gene location (Mouse)
Chr.	Chromosome 7 (mouse)
Band	7|7 B3	Start	45,433,162 bp
Band	7|7 B3	End	45,453,568 bp
RNA expression pattern
Bgee	Human / Mouse (ortholog); Top expressed in: right frontal lobe; Brodmann area 9; anterior cingulate cortex; nucleus accumbens; putamen; right hemisphere of cerebellum; caudate nucleus; prefrontal cortex; amygdala; hypothalamus / Top expressed in: primary visual cortex; superior frontal gyrus; dentate gyrus of hippocampal formation granule cell; inferior ganglion of glossopharyngeal nerve; Scarpa's ganglion; neural layer of retina; ventricular zone; cerebellar cortex; tail of embryo; genital tubercle; More reference expression data
BioGPS	n/a
Gene ontology
Molecular function	transferase activity; nucleotide binding; protein kinase activity; protein serine/threonine kinase activity; ATP binding; metal ion binding; kinase activity; molecular function; protein binding
Cellular component	integral component of membrane; Golgi membrane; axon; Golgi apparatus; dendrite; cell projection; membrane; cellular component
Biological process	negative regulation of phosphatase activity; protein phosphorylation; phosphorylation
Sources:Amigo / QuickGO
Orthologs
Databases	NCBI: entry; OMA: entry
Species	Human	Mouse
Entrez	114783	381983
Ensembl	ENSG00000142235	ENSMUSG00000062044
UniProt	Q96Q04	Q5XJV6
RefSeq (mRNA)	NM_001080434; NM_001388485	NM_001005511; NM_001290990
RefSeq (protein)	NP_001073903	NP_001005511; NP_001277919
Location (UCSC)	Chr 19: 48.49 – 48.51 Mb	Chr 7: 45.43 – 45.45 Mb
PubMed search
- Wikidata
View/Edit Human	View/Edit Mouse

Lemur tail kinase 3 is a protein that in humans is encoded by the LMTK3 gene.

LMTK3 is often overexpressed in human cancers where it promotes tumour growth, invasion and metastasis and therapy resistance. It was first identified in 2011 through a kinase screen of regulators of ERα by Giamas et al. who found that it promotes upregulation of ERα through PKC inhibition and inhibits ERα degradation through direct phosphorylation of ERα. Numerous other studies have linked LMTK3 to cancer in glioblastoma, non-small cell lung cancer, thyroid malignancies and bladder cancer, among others. A small molecule inhibitor, C28, has now been developed for LMTK3 which shows potent anti-cancer activity in vitro and in vivo.

== Function ==
The most well-characterised physiological role of LMTK3 is in the central nervous system. LMTK3 is expressed in the cerebral cortex, striatum, cerebellum, hippocampus, olfactory bulb and tubercle. LMTK3 knockout mice are more hyperactive and show less signs of anxiety than wild-type counterparts. In addition, the mice showed lower levels of depression-like behaviour in forced swim tests and tail suspension assays. LMTK3 knockout mice also have cognitive impairments and show behaviour related to schizophrenia and bipolar disorder. This may be due to impairment in GluA1 trafficking in neurons. These studies show that LMTK3 plays an important role in the central nervous system.

== Clinical significance ==
LMTK3 is implicated in a number of human cancers as an oncogene as well as a potential predictive or prognostic biomarker. The most well-known role of LMTK3 is in ERα signalling. In 2011, Giamas et al. showed that LMTK3 is a potent regulator of ERα through a kinome-wide siRNA screen. By examining the effect of depletion of different genes of the expression of an ERα-regulated gene, they showed that LMTK3 knockdown significantly reduces ERα activity. LMTK3 phosphorylates ERα, increasing stability and protecting ERα from proteasomal degradation. LMTK3 also inhibits PKC, reducing AKT activity and therefore allowing accumulation of FoxO3 in cells, lifting inhibition of ESR1 transcription, causing an increase in ERα expression. An in vivo model also showed that LMTK3 siRNA reduces tumour growth in mice injected with MCF7 ER+ cells. Later analyses of clinical data show that LMTK3 is predictive and prognostic in breast cancer. High nuclear and cytoplasmic staining in breast cancer cells for LMTK3 is associated with poor clinical outcomes .

LMTK3 is also associated with endocrine resistance in breast cancer. Stebbing et al. showed that LMTK3 regulates a number of genes involved in tamoxifen resistance. LMTK3 overexpression also promotes chemotherapy resistance in breast cancer cells.

Later, another study by Giamas' group revealed that LMTK3 is strongly associated with cell invasiveness and metastasis through regulation of integrin subunits. LMTK3 acts through GRB2, inducing RAS activation and CDC42 activation, leading to increased ITGA5 and ITGB1 expression through the transcription factor, serum response factor (SRF). The group also showed that LMTK3 has nuclear roles where is facilitates the interaction between KAP1 (Krüppel-associated box domain-associated protein 1) and a KAP1 phosphatase, PP1α (protein phosphatase 1α). This results in trimethylation of Histone H3 lysine 9 (H3K9me3) at tumour suppressor-like genes, resulting in silencing and a downregulation of tumour suppressors in breast cancer.

Giamas' group discovered the small molecule inhibitor, C28 in 2020 which is a potent, selective inhibitor of LMTK3. C28 is an orally available and highly selective ATP-competitive inhibitor of LMTK3. Data from the NCI-60 cell line panel and experiments in xenografts show that the drug is an effective inhibitor of breast cancer growth in vivo. LMTK3 is an HSP90-CDC37 client protein which requires this interaction for folding and stability. C28 is a competitive inhibitor of LMTK3 that also deprives LMTK3 of HSP90, promoting instability and degradation of LMTK3. More recently, another compound, C36 has been characterised as a selective inhibitor of LMTK3 with apoptosis-promoting properties in breast cancer cells.
