= Baseball Heaven =

Baseball complex in Long Island, New York, U.S.

Coordinates: 40°49′16″N 72°56′58″W

Lasorda Legacy Park
- Interactive map of Lasorda Legacy Park
- Address: 350 Sills Rd, Yaphank, New York 11980
- Type: Baseball complex
- Event: Sporting events
- Surface: Artificial turf
- Scoreboard: Yes

Website
- https://www.lasordalegacypark.com

Lasorda Legacy Park (formerly known as Baseball Heaven) is a 27-acre baseball complex in Yaphank, New York on Long Island. The baseball complex is located nearby the Long Island MacArthur Airport. Lasorda Legacy Park has been around since August 6, 2002. Lasorda Legacy Park attracts talent from the New England and Mid-Atlantic states. The complex features four ninety foot base path artificial turf fields and three are seventy foot artificial turf fields. Approximately 750,000 people visit Lasorda Legacy Park on an annual basis.

== Ownership ==
Lasorda Legacy Park was acquired by Steel Sports on June 27, 2011. BBH completed the build of a 12,000-square-foot facility, $1.9 million indoor training facility on its site called Steel Sports Academy.

== Features ==
Lasorda Legacy Park's amenities include below grade dugouts, connecting bullpens, warning tracks, P.A. systems, electronic scoreboards, and an artificial turf. The complex accommodates its spectators with ballpark seating, concessions, restaurant, and a picnic area.

== Notable events ==
The Lasorda Legacy Park complex has been host to the National Youth Baseball Championships (NYBC) since 2014. In September 2014, a Long Island Little League coach was struck in the head by a baseball during warmups and was knocked unconscious. He was rushed to the nearby Brookhaven Memorial Hospital Medical Center in East Patchogue where he was pronounced dead.
