= Bellevue Healthcare Trust =

British health care investment company

- Formerly: BB Healthcare Trust
- Company type: Public company
- Traded as: LSE: BBH
- Industry: Investment Management
- Founded: 2016; 9 years ago
- Headquarters: London, United Kingdom
- Area served: Worldwide
- Key people: Randeep Grewal (Chairman); Paul Major and Brett Darke (managers)
- Website: www.bbhealthcaretrust.com/en/bb-healthcare-trust/

Bellevue Healthcare Trust is a large British investment trust dedicated to investments in listed or quoted healthcare companies on a worldwide basis. It is listed on the London Stock Exchange.

== History ==
The company was launched on the basis of a prospectus issued on 10 November 2016.

The company changed its name from BB Healthcare Trust to Bellevue Healthcare Trust, to establish consistency with the name of its investment manager, on 3 March 2022.

== Investment activity ==
The company is managed by Paul Major and Brett Darke of Bellevue Asset Management (UK) Limited and the chairman is Randeep Grewal.

The company's largest investments as at 31 November 2021 were as follows:

Largest investments
Ranking	Company	Valuation (£'m)
1	Vertex Pharmaceuticals	79.1
2	Jazz Pharmaceuticals	75.8
3	Insmed	71.5
4	Anthem	58.5
5	Humana	55.2
