= List of geology journals =

This is a list of geology journals and related Earth science journals, including academic periodicals that publish research related to geology, geoscience, and the Earth sciences.

== Geology journals ==
- Acta Geologica Polonica
- American Journal of Science
- American Mineralogist
- American Museum Novitates
- Andean Geology
- Annals of Carnegie Museum
- Archivos do Museu Nacional
- Atlantic Geoscience
- Australian Journal of Earth Sciences
- Austrian Journal of Earth Sciences
- Boletín de Geología
- Boletín de la Sociedad Geológica del Perú
- Brazilian Journal of Geology
- Bulletin de la Société Géologique de France
- Bulletin of Geosciences
- Bulletin of the Geological Society of Finland
- Bulletin of the Natural History Museum
- Bulletin of the Seismological Society of America
- Bulletin of Volcanology
- Carbonates and Evaporites
- Carnets Geol.
- Contributions to Mineralogy and Petrology
- Courier Forschungsinstitut Senckenberg
- Economic and Environmental Geology
- Economic Geology (journal)
- Elements (journal)
- Episodes (journal)
- Estudios Geológicos
- Földtani Közlöny
- GeoArabia
- Geofísica Internacional
- Geoheritage (journal)
- Geologica Acta
- Geologica Belgica
- Geologica Carpathica
- Geological Journal
- Geological Magazine
- Geological Society of America Bulletin
- Geological Survey of Denmark and Greenland Bulletin
- Geological Survey of Finland, Bulletin
- Geology (journal)
- Geology Today
- Géotechnique
- Geotectonics (journal)
- GFF (journal)
- Hellenic Journal of Geosciences
- Historia naturalis bulgarica
- Hydrogeology Journal
- International Geology Review
- Island Arc (journal)
- Johnson Matthey Technology Review
- Journal of African Earth Sciences
- The Journal of Geology
- Journal of Geosciences
- Journal of Iberian Geology
- Journal of Petroleum Geology
- Journal of Petrology
- Journal of Sedimentary Research
- Journal of South American Earth Sciences
- Journal of Structural Geology
- Journal of the Geological Society
- Journal of Volcanology and Geothermal Research
- Latin American Journal of Sedimentology and Basin Analysis
- Lithos (journal)
- Marine and Petroleum Geology
- Marine Geology (journal)
- Mineralium Deposita
- Neues Jahrbuch für Geologie und Paläontologie
- Norwegian Journal of Geology
- PALAIOS
- Precambrian Research
- Reports and Transactions, Cardiff Naturalists' Society
- Revista de la Asociación Geológica Argentina
- Revista Mexicana de Ciencias Geológicas
- Scripta Geologica
- Sedimentary Geology (journal)
- South African Journal of Geology
- Stratigraphy and Geological Correlation
- Studia Quaternaria
- Zeitschrift für Geologische Wissenschaften

== Geoscience journals ==
- Annual Review of Earth and Planetary Sciences
- Applied Geochemistry
- Arctic, Antarctic, and Alpine Research
- Biogeosciences
- Canadian Journal of Earth Sciences
- Chemical Geology
- Comptes Rendus Geoscience
- Computers & Geosciences
- Earth and Planetary Science Letters
- Earth Interactions
- Earth Surface Dynamics
- Earth Surface Processes and Landforms
- Earth System Dynamics
- Earth, Planets and Space
- Earth-Science Reviews
- Environmental Earth Sciences
- Geobiology (journal)
- Geochemistry, Geophysics, Geosystems
- Geochimica et Cosmochimica Acta
- Geografiska Annaler
- Geomorphology (journal)
- Geophysical Journal International
- Geophysical Research Letters
- Geoscientific Model Development
- Global and Planetary Change
- Gondwana Research
- Hydrology and Earth System Sciences
- International Journal of Earth Sciences
- International Journal of Speleology
- Jökull (journal)
- Journal of Asian Earth Sciences
- Journal of Earthquake and Tsunami
- Journal of Geodynamics
- Journal of Geophysical Research
- Journal of Glaciology
- Journal of Hydrology
- Journal of Mountain Science
- Journal of Quaternary Science
- Landslides (journal)
- Limnological Review
- Lithosphere (journal)
- Mathematical Geosciences
- Nature Geoscience
- New Zealand Journal of Geology and Geophysics
- Nonlinear Processes in Geophysics
- Ocean Science (journal)
- Open Geosciences
- Permafrost and Periglacial Processes
- Physics of the Earth and Planetary Interiors
- Polar Science
- Pure and Applied Geophysics
- Quaternary Geochronology
- Quaternary International
- Quaternary Science Reviews
- Radiocarbon (journal)
- Reviews of Geophysics
- Russian Journal of Earth Sciences
- Seismological Research Letters
- Solid Earth (journal)
- Space Weather
- Surveys in Geophysics
- Tectonics (journal)
- Tectonophysics (journal)
- Terra Nova (journal)
- Zeitschrift für Geomorphologie

== See also ==
- Earth science
- Geochemistry
- Geology
- Geophysics
- Geoprofessions
- Geotourism
- Glossary of geology
- Hydrogeology
- Index of geology articles
- International Union of Geological Sciences
- List of earth and atmospheric sciences journals
- List of geological modelling software
- List of individual rocks
- List of scientific journals
- Lists of journals
- Mineralogy
- Numerical modeling (geology)
- Outline of geology
- Petrology
- Sedimentology
- Stratigraphy
- Timeline of geology
- Volcanology
