= List of earth and atmospheric sciences journals =

This list presents notable scientific journals in earth and atmospheric sciences and its various subfields.

== Multi-disciplinary ==
- Acta Agriculturae Scandinavica B
- American Journal of Science
- Earth Interactions
- Earth-Science Reviews
- Eos
- Geografiska Annaler: Series A
- Geoscientific Model Development
- Geosphere
- Gondwana Research
- Global and Planetary Change
- Journal of Advances in Modeling Earth Systems
- Journal of Soil and Water Conservation
- Nature Climate Change
- Nature Geoscience
- Open Geosciences
- Permafrost and Periglacial Processes
- Plant and Soil
- Pochvovedenie
- Revista Mexicana de Ciencias Geológicas
- Science of the Total Environment
- Soil Research
- Soil Science Society of America Journal
- Zeitschrift für Geologische Wissenschaften

== Atmospheric science ==
- Advances in Atmospheric Sciences
- Agricultural and Forest Meteorology
- Atmosphere
- Atmospheric Chemistry and Physics
- Atmospheric Measurement Techniques
- Atmospheric Research
- Atmospheric Science Letters
- Boundary-Layer Meteorology
- Bulletin of the American Meteorological Society
- Climate Dynamics
- Climate Research
- Climatic Change
- International Journal of Biometeorology
- Journal of Applied Meteorology and Climatology
- Journal of Atmospheric and Oceanic Technology
- Journal of Atmospheric and Solar-Terrestrial Physics
- Journal of the Atmospheric Sciences
- Journal of Climate
- Journal of Geophysical Research: section D (Atmospheres)
- Journal of Hydrometeorology
- Meteorological Monographs
- Meteorologische Zeitschrift
- Monthly Weather Review
- National Weather Digest
- Quarterly Journal of the Royal Meteorological Society
- Tellus. Series A: Dynamic Meteorology and Oceanography
- Tellus. Series B: Chemical and Physical Meteorology
- Theoretical and Applied Climatology
- Weather
- Weather and Forecasting

== Geochemistry ==
- Chemical Geology
- Geochimica et Cosmochimica Acta
- Geostandards and Geoanalytical Research
- Geostandards Newsletter
- Organic Geochemistry
- Quaternary Geochronology

== Geology ==
- Annual Review of Earth and Planetary Sciences
- American Association of Petroleum Geologists Bulletin
- Andean Geology
- Atlantic Geology
- Bulletin of Volcanology
- Bulletin of the Seismological Society of America
- Canadian Journal of Earth Sciences
- Economic Geology
- Earth and Planetary Science Letters
- Earth Surface Processes and Landforms
- GeoArabia
- Geoheritage
- Geologica Acta
- Geological Society of America Bulletin
- Geology
- Geomorphology (journal)
- Geophysical Journal International
- GFF
- International Journal of Earth Sciences
- International Journal of Speleology
- Journal of African Earth Sciences
- Journal of Geology
- Journal of Geophysical Research: sections B (Solid Earth), F (Earth Surface), G (Biogeosciences)
- Journal of Sedimentary Research
- Journal of Structural Geology
- Journal of South American Earth Sciences
- Journal of Volcanology and Geothermal Research
- Lithos (journal)
- Lithosphere (journal)
- Norwegian Journal of Geology
- PALAIOS
- Precambrian Research
- Revista de la Asociación Geológica Argentina
- Revista Geológica de Chile
- Revista Mexicana de Ciencias Geológicas
- Scripta Geologica
- Terra Nova (journal)
- Sedimentary Geology
- South African Journal of Geology

=== Mineralogy and petrology ===
- American Mineralogist
- Contributions to Mineralogy and Petrology
- European Journal of Mineralogy
- Journal of Petrology
- Mineralium Deposita
- Reviews in Mineralogy and Geochemistry

== Geophysics ==
- Annales Geophysicae
- Astronomy & Geophysics
- Earth, Planets and Space
- Geofísica Internacional
- Geophysical Journal International
- Geophysical Research Letters
- Geophysics
- Geochemistry, Geophysics, Geosystems
- Journal of Geodesy
- Journal of Geodynamics
- Journal of Geophysical Research
- Journal of Geophysics and Engineering
- Physics of the Earth and Planetary Interiors
- Pure and Applied Geophysics
- Reviews of Geophysics
- Seismological Research Letters
- Surveys in Geophysics
- Solid Earth
- Tectonics
- Tectonophysics

== Hydrology ==
- Journal of Hydrology
- Water Research
- Water Resources Research

== Oceanography ==
- Annual Review of Marine Science
- Deep Sea Research
- Journal of Geophysical Research: section C (Oceans)
- Journal of Marine Research
- Journal of Physical Oceanography
- Ocean Modelling
- Ocean Science
- Paleoceanography

== Unsorted ==
- Episodes
- Journal of Glaciology
- Australian Meteorological Magazine

== See also ==
- List of scientific journals
