= Tellus =

Tellus is a Latin word meaning "Earth" and may refer to:

- An alternative name for the planet Earth
- Tellus of Athens, a citizen of ancient Athens who was thought to be the happiest of men
- Tellus Mater or Terra Mater, the ancient Roman earth mother goddess
- Tellus Science Museum in Cartersville, Georgia
- Tellus A, a scientific journal of Dynamic Meteorology and Oceanography
- Tellus B, a scientific journal of Chemical and Physical Meteorology
- Tellus Institute, an American environmental think tank
- Tellus (app), a financial services and property management company
- Tellus (comics), a comic book character and member of the Legion of Super-Heroes
- A fictional human colony in the TV series Space: Above and Beyond
- Tellus Audio Cassette Magazine, an extinct nonprofit audio art project
- IK Tellus, a sports club based in Tellusborg in Stockholm, Sweden

== See also ==
- Telus (disambiguation)
- Bematistes tellus, a butterfly in the family Nymphalidae
- Telluric (disambiguation)
- Tellurium
- Terra (disambiguation)
