= Acta Sedimentologica Sinica =

"sedimentology", "sedimentary mineral deposits", "geochemistry", "Academic Journal"

- Acta Sedimentologica Sinica (cover)
- Discipline: Geology
- Language: Chinese
- Edited by: Chengshan Wang

Publication details
- History: 1983–present
- Frequency: Bimonthly
- Open access: Yes
- License: Creative Commons Attribution License

Standard abbreviations
- ISO 4: Acta Sedimentol. Sin.

Indexing
- CODEN: CHXUEE
- ISSN: 1000-0550

Links
- Journal homepage; Online access; Online archive

Acta Sedimentologica Sinica (Chinese name: 沉积学报) is a peer-reviewed scientific journal covering the fields of sedimentology, sedimentary mineral deposits, and geochemistry. It is sponsored by the Professional Committee of Sedimentology of the Chinese Society of Mineral and Rock Geochemistry and the Professional Committee of Sedimentary Geology of the Chinese Geological Society.

== History ==
The journal was established in 1983 and as submissions increased switched to a biomonthly schedule in 2006. The editor-in-chief is Chengshan Wang (Chinese Academy of Sciences). Baojun Liu (Division of Earth Sciences, Chinese Academy of Sciences) is honorary editor-in-chief.

== Abstracting and indexing ==
the journal is abstracted and indexed by:

- Scopus
- EBSCO databases
- Chemical Abstracts Service
- DOAJ
- Chinese Science Citation Database (CSCD)
- Geobase
- Database of Japan Science & Technology Agency (JST)

== Notable articles ==
According to the Web of Science, the following three articles have been cited most often (>350 times):

1. Hua, YANG (10 April 2010). "Analysis on Sedimentary Facies of Member 7 in Yanchang Formation of Triassic in Ordos Basin". Acta Sedimentologica Sinica. 28 (2): 254–263. doi:10.14027/j.cnki.cjxb.2010.02.014.
2. Zhen, QIU; Caineng, ZOU (10 February 2020). "Unconventional Petroleum Sedimentology: Connotation and Prospect". Acta Sedimentologica Sinica. 38 (1): 1–29. doi:10.14027/j.issn.1000-0550.2019.116.
3. Aihua, Wang (1996). "Discriminant Effect of Sedimentary Environment by the Sr/Ba Ratio of Different Existing Forms". Acta Sedimentologica Sinica. 14 (4): 168–173.

== See also ==
- Nature Geoscience
- Palaeogeography, Palaeoclimatology, Palaeoecology
- Sedimentary Geology
