= S. K. Satheesh =

Indian meteorologist (born 1970)

- Born: 1 May 1970 (age 56); Thiruvananthapuram, Kerala, India
- Education: University of Kerala; Vikram Sarabhai Space Centre; Scripps Institution of Oceanography
- Known for: Studies on atmospheric aerosols
- Awards: 1997 PRL Best Research Paper Award; 2001 START Young Scientist Award; 2001 INSA Young Scientists' Medal; 2001 WMO Young Scientist Award; 2007 AARA Asian Young Aerosol Scientist Award; 2007 SCOPUS Young Scientist Award; 2007 PRL Research Award; 2008 KU Rajib Goyal Prize; 2009 S. S. Bhatnagar Prize; 2009 AGU Editors’ Citation; 2011 TWAS Prize
- Scientific career
- Fields: Atmospheric aerosols
- Workplaces: Indian Institute of Science; Divecha Center For Climate Change; University of Bern; Aryabhatta Research Institute of Observational Sciences; IISER Bopal

Sreedharan Krishnakumari Satheesh (born 1970) is an Indian meteorologist and a professor at the Centre for Atmospheric and Oceanic Sciences of the Indian Institute of Science (IISc). He holds the chair of the Divecha Centre for Climate Change, a centre under the umbrella of the IISc for researches on climate variability, climate change and their impact on the environment. He is known for his studies on atmospheric aerosols and is an elected fellow of all the three major Indian science academies viz. Indian Academy of Sciences Indian National Science Academy and the National Academy of Sciences, India as well as The World Academy of Sciences. The Council of Scientific and Industrial Research, the apex agency of the Government of India for scientific research, awarded him the Shanti Swarup Bhatnagar Prize for Science and Technology, one of the highest Indian science awards for his contributions to Earth, Atmosphere, Ocean and Planetary Sciences in 2009. (Note: Long link - please select award year to see details) He received the TWAS Prize of The World Academy of Sciences in 2011. In 2018, he received the Infosys Prize (in Physical Sciences category), one of the highest monetary awards in India that recognize excellence in science and research, for his work in the field of climate change.

== Biography ==
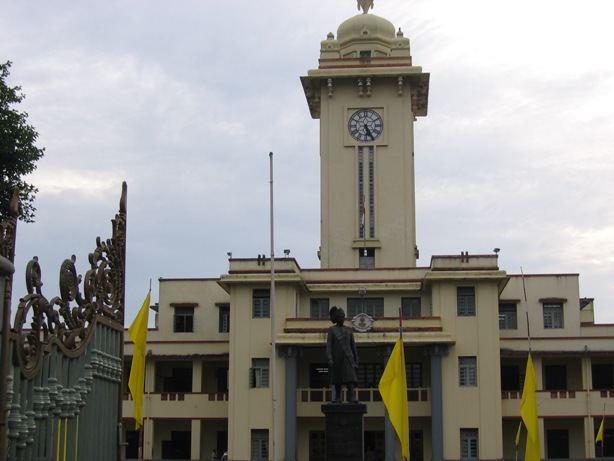
University of Kerala

S. K. Satheesh, born on 1 May 1970 in Thiruvananthapuram, the capital city of the south Indian state of Kerala to Sreedharan Nair and Krishnakumari Amma, did his graduate studies in science at the University of Kerala during 1987-90 and completed his master's degree from the same university in 1990. Enrolling at Kerala University, he did his doctoral studies at the Vikram Sarabhai Space Centre and after securing a PhD in 1997, he moved to the US for his post-doctoral work which was done at the Center for Clouds, Chemistry and Climate (C4) of Scripps Institution of Oceanography during 1998–2000. On his return to India, he joined the Centre for Atmospheric and Oceanic Sciences (CAOS) of the Indian Institute of Science as an assistant professor and has been serving IISc since then. During this period, he held the post of an associate professor from 2006 till he became a professor in 2011. He is the incumbent chairman of Divecha Center For Climate Change, a research wing of IISc for climate-related studies. He also served as a visiting scientist at the University of Bern and is an adjunct professor at the Aryabhatta Research Institute of Observational Sciences (ARIES) and the Indian Institute of Science Education and Research, Bhopal.

Satheesh is married to Deepshikha singh and the couple has one son, Satdeep Satheesh. The family lives in Bengaluru, India. His brother-in-law, Jaivir singh is an alumnus of IIT Kanpur and is currently a physics teacher at the Allen career institute.

== Legacy ==
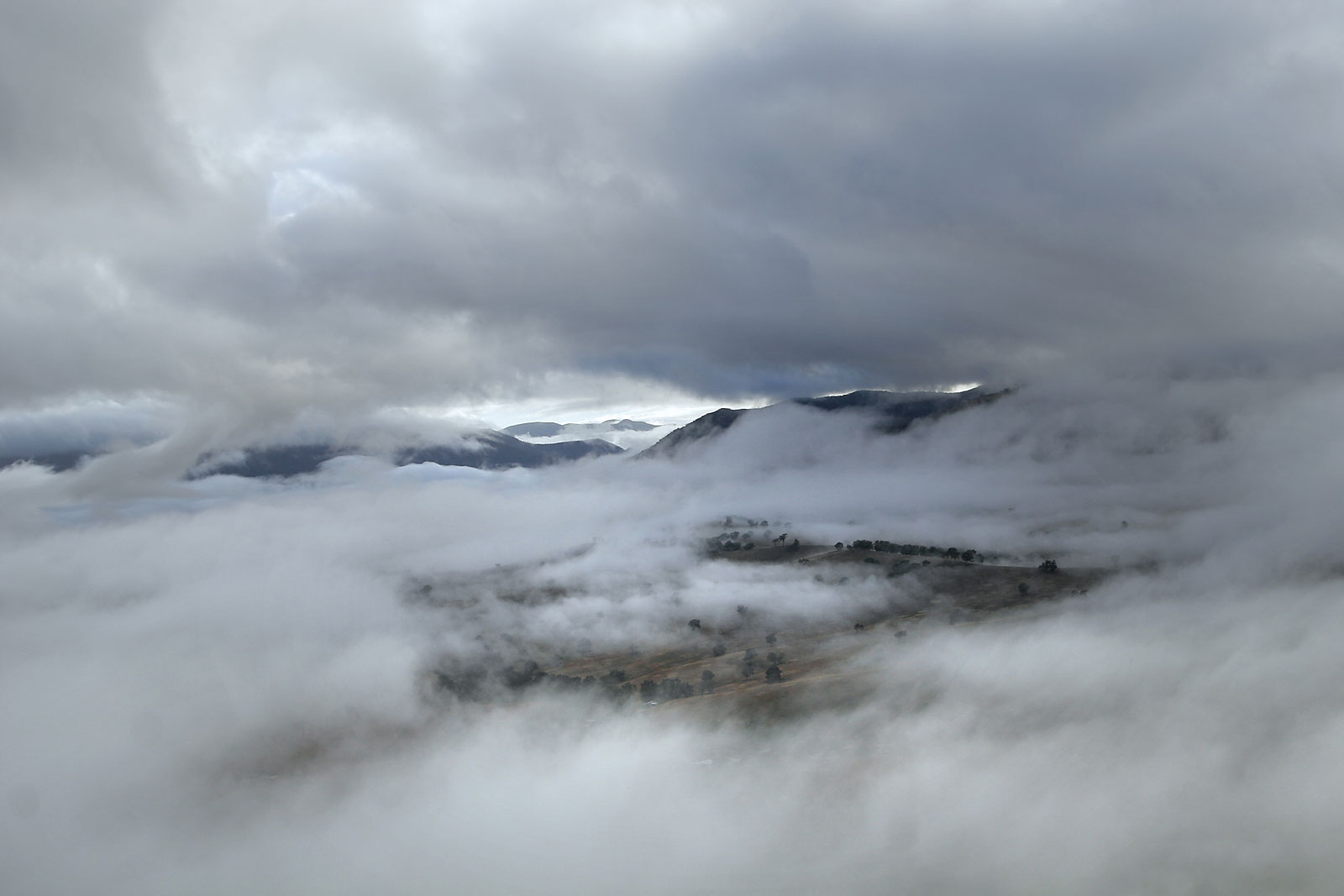
Mists and clouds are aerosols

Satheesh is reported to have done extensive studies on atmospheric aerosols and his work is known to have widened our understanding of their impact on climate. He elucidated how the radiation balance of the Earth-atmosphere system and climate are influenced by the aerosols and one of his principal contributions is the hypothesis he suggested for the resolution of anomalous absorption paradox, a meteorological problem where cloud absorption measurements, at times, show inconsistency with the theoretical calculations. He has also experimentally shown how human-generated soot results in higher atmospheric temperatures by absorbing sunlight. Dust Absorption Efficiency (DAE) is another area of focus of his researches and he has studied the topic in relation to Afro-Asian regions and Indian deserts. His studies have been documented in several peer-reviewed articles; (Note: Please see Selected bibliography section) ResearchGate an online repository of scientific articles, has listed 171 of them. Two of his articles, Enhanced aerosol loading over Arabian Sea during pre-monsoon season: Natural or Anthropogenic? and Short wave versus long wave radiative forcing due to aerosol over Indian Ocean: Role of sea-surface winds, were included in the AGU Highlights by the American Geophysical Union during 2002–03 and his article, Radiative Effects of Natural Aerosols: A Review was listed as a Top 25 Hottest Article by ScienceDirect, an online scientific database.

Satheesh was a member of the first phase of Indian Ocean Experiment (INDOEX) conducted by an international team of scientists in 1999 and his article on the experiment warned of the rising aerosol levels in the atmosphere and its negative impact on climate. He also explained how monsoons were affected by the dust-containing aerosols of Arabian and Saharan regions and the sea-salt carrying aerosols of the Arabian Sea. He has delivered several keynote or invited speeches on the topic.

Satheesh has been involved with the several national and international scientific committees which included Scientific Committee of the International Geosphere-Biosphere Programme and Aryabhatta Research Institute of Observational Sciences, Steering Committee on Aerosols, Clouds, Precipitation, Climate of the World Climate Research Program, Core Science Team for the Indian Satellite for Aerosols and Gases of Indian Space Research Organization and the Committee for the assessment of environmental impact of Namma Metro project, Bangalore. He was the principal investigator or co-principal investigator of the Ganges Valley Aerosol Experiment (GVAX) and Multi-Angle Polarization Imager (MAPI) of ISRO and the Chief Mission Scientist of the Integrated Campaign for Aerosols, Gases and Radiation Budget (ICARB) experiment of ISRO. He sat in the technical programs committee of the Asian Aerosol Conference in 2005, program committee of the SPIE International symposium of 2006, departmental promotion committee and national committee on Aerosol Radiation Budget Studies (ARBS) of the Indian Space Research Organization and was a member of the working groups of ISRO - Geosphere Biosphere Programme (ISRO-GBP) (2001-2007), Environmental Monitoring Research Centre (EMRC) of India Meteorological Department and Hyperpsectral Signature Database Management System of the Department of Science and Technology. He was a co-convener of the National Space Science Symposium held at Kottayam in 2004 and the AOGS2014 conference organized by Asia Oceania Geosciences Society in Singapore in 2005. His contributions are also reported in the establishment of a South Asia regional office of Future Earth initiative at Divecha Centre for Climate Change in November 2016.

Satheesh was one of the lead authors of the Chapter 7, Clouds and Aerosols, of the Fifth Assessment Report prepared by the Working Group I of the Intergovernmental Panel on Climate Change (IPCC) and is a member of the selection committee (2013–16) of the Haagen-Smit Prize of Elsevier. He has been associated with a number of science journals; he is a former associate editor of the Journal of Geophysical Research of American Geophysical Union, a former member of the editorial board of the Atmospheric Environment journal of Elsevier and the incumbent co-editor of Current Science journal of the Indian Academy of Sciences. He is a referee for a number of journals (Note: The list of journals Satheesh is associated as a reviewer includes Journal of Geophysical Research, Geophysical Research Letters, IEEE Transactions on Geo Science & Remote Sensing, IEEE Geo Science & Remote Sensing Letters, Optical Engineering Journal, Current Science, Proceedings of the Indian Academy of Sciences, Mausam, Annales Geophysicae, Tellus B, Atmospheric Environment, International Journal of Remote Sensing, Atmospheric Research and Theoretical and Applied Climatology) and is a reviewer for NASA, UNEP, Israel Science Foundation, ISRO, Department of Science and Technology (India) and Council of Scientific and Industrial Research, for their funding activities. He is also a former secretary (2003–06) of the Bangalore chapter of the Indian Meteorological Society.

== Awards and honors ==
His early years in research earned Satheesh the Best Research Paper Award of the Physical Research Laboratory in 1997 and a Certificate of Merit of the Swadeshi Science Movement, Kochi in 1999. The International START Secretariat, USA awarded him the Young Scientist Award in 2001, the same year as he received the Young Associate-ship of the Indian Academy of Sciences, with the tenure running till 2005. The next year, he received the Young Scientists' Medal of the Indian National Science Academy and the Young Scientist Award of the World Meteorological Organisation. Three awards reached him in 2007, Asian Young Aerosol Scientist Award of the Asian Aerosol Research Assembly (AARA), SCOPUS Young Scientist Award in Earth Sciences of Elsevier and the PRL Research Award of the Physical Research Laboratory. He received the Rajib Goyal Prize in Physical Sciences of Kurukshetra University in 2008 and the Council of Scientific and Industrial Research awarded him the Shanti Swarup Bhatnagar Prize, one of the highest Indian science awards in 2009. The same year, the American Geophysical Union selected him for the Editors’ Citations for Excellence in Refereeing for his work in Geophysical Research Letters and The World Academy of Sciences awarded him the TWAS Prize, making him the first Malayali scientist to receive the honor.

Satheesh, a NASA Senior fellow of NASA Goddard Space Flight Center and an ORAU Senior Fellow, received the Swarna Jayanthi Fellowship of the Department of Science and Technology for the year 2005–06. The Indian Academy of Sciences elected him as their fellow in 2010 and he became a fellow of the National Academy of Sciences, India, the same year. The Indian National Science Academy followed suit in 2011 and two years later, he was elected as a fellow by The World Academy of Sciences (2013). He is also a fellow of the Indo-Swiss Bilateral Research Initiative.

== Selected bibliography ==
- Satheesh, S. K. (2002). "Aerosol radiative forcing over tropical Indian Ocean: modulation by sea-surface winds". Current Science. 82 (3).
- Satheesh, S. K.; Lubin, D. (2003). "Short wave versus long wave radiative forcing by Indian Ocean aerosols: role of sea-surface winds". Geophysical Research Letters. 30 (13): 1695. Bibcode:2003GeoRL..30.1695S. doi:10.1029/2003GL017499.
- Vinoj, V.; Babu, S. Suresh; Satheesh, S. K.; Krishnamoorthy, Krishnaswamy; Kaufman, Y. J. (2004). "Radiative forcing by aerosols over the Bay of Bengal region derived from shipborne, island-based, and satellite (moderate-resolution imaging spectroradiometer) observations". Journal of Geophysical Research: Atmospheres. 109 (D5): D05203–D05213. Bibcode:2004JGRD..109.5203V. doi:10.1029/2003JD004329.
- Satheesh, S. K.; Krishna Moorthy, K. (2005). "Radiative effects of natural aerosols: a review". Atmospheric Environment. 39 (11): 2089–2110. Bibcode:2005AtmEn..39.2089S. doi:10.1016/j.atmosenv.2004.12.029.
- Suresh Babu, S.; Krishna Moorthy, K.; Satheesh, S. K. (2006). Tsay, Si-Chee; Nakajima, Teruyuki; Singh, Ramesh P; Sridharan, R (eds.). "Temporal heterogeneity in aerosol characteristics at a tropical coastal station and the resulting radiative impacts". Proceedings of SPIE. Remote Sensing of the Atmosphere and Clouds. 6408: 6408–13. Bibcode:2006SPIE.6408E..13B. doi:10.1117/12.696113. S2CID 129723648.
- Babu, S. Suresh; Krishna Moorthy, K.; Satheesh, S. K. (2007). "Temporal heterogeneity in aerosol characteristics and the resulting radiative impacts at a tropical coastal station- Part 2: Direct short wave radiative forcing". Annales Geophysicae. 25 (11): 2309–2320. Bibcode:2007AnGeo..25.2309B. doi:10.5194/angeo-25-2309-2007.
- Satheesh, S. K.; Krishna Moorthy, K.; Babu, S. Suresh; Vinoj, V.; Dutt, C. B. S. (2008). "Climate implications of large warming by elevated aerosol over India". Geophysical Research Letters. 35 (19): L19809–L19814. Bibcode:2008GeoRL..3519809S. doi:10.1029/2008GL034944.
- Krishnamoorthy, K.; Nair, Vijayakumar S.; Babu, S. Suresh; Satheesh, S. K. (2009). "Spatial and vertical heterogeneities in aerosol properties over oceanic regions around India: implications for radiative forcing". Quarterly Journal of the Royal Meteorological Society. 135 (645): 2131–2145. Bibcode:2009QJRMS.135.2131M. doi:10.1002/qj.525. S2CID 122020500.
- Suresh Babu, S.; Krishna Moorthy, K.; Manchanda, Ravi K.; Sinha, Puna Ram; Satheesh, S. K.; Vajja, Dinkar Prasad; Srinivasan, S.; Arun Kumar, V. H. (2010). "Free tropospheric black carbon aerosol measurements using high altitude balloon: do BC layers build "their own homes" up in the atmosphere?". Geophysical Research Letters. 38 (8): L08803_1–L08803_6. Bibcode:2011GeoRL..38.8803B. doi:10.1029/2011GL046654. S2CID 128179929.
- Satheesh, S. K.; Vinoj, V.; Krishna Moorthy, K. (2011). "Weekly periodicities of aerosol properties observed at an urban location in India". Atmospheric Research. 101 (1–2): 307–313. Bibcode:2011AtmRe.101..307S. doi:10.1016/j.atmosres.2011.03.003.

== See also ==
- Particulates
- Ozone depletion
- Global warming
- Carbon footprint
