= John Call Cook =

American geophysicist (1918–2012)

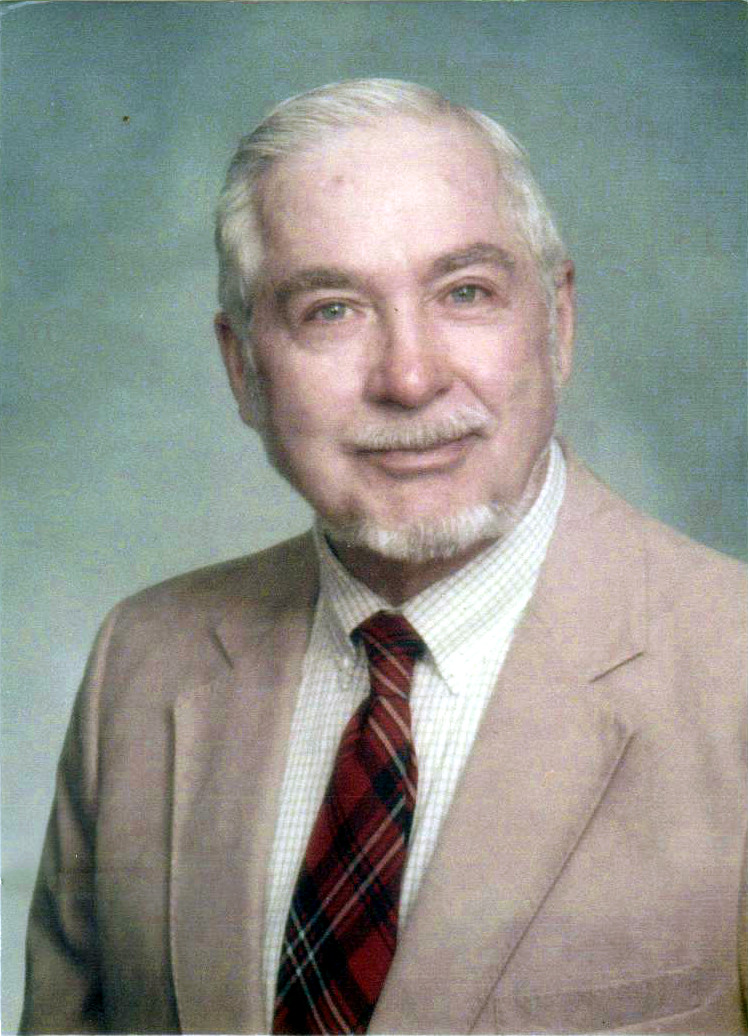
- John Call Cook, 1988
- Born: April 7, 1918; Afton, Wyoming, U.S.
- Died: October 12, 2012 (aged 94); Highland, Utah
- Education: University of Utah, Pennsylvania State University
- Known for: Ground-penetrating radar, Crevasse Detector
- Scientific career
- Fields: Geophysics, Physics, Electronics, Astronomy, and natural philosophy
- Workplaces: Southwest Research Institute, Teledyne Geotech
- Thesis: An Analysis of Airborne Surveying for Surface Radioactivity (1951)
- Doctoral advisor: B. F. Howell, Jr.

John Call Cook (April 7, 1918 – October 12, 2012) was an American geophysicist who played a significant role in establishing the field of ground-penetrating radar. He is widely recognized for contributing fundamental research that advanced its development. Cook also demonstrated that aerial surveys could map surface radioactivity, enabling more efficient prospecting for uranium ore. He invented electrostatic detection methods for identifying hazardous ice crevasses and developed additional techniques in remote sensing.

For most of his professional career, Cook specialized in remote sensing and the detection of underground objects.

== Early years ==
John Call Cook was born on April 7, 1918, in Afton, Wyoming, to Carl and Ella Cook. His father worked as an attorney and farmer, and was the son of Phineas Wolcott Cook and his fourth wife, Johanna.

As a teenager, Cook constructed a number of devices, including a spark-gap transmitter, a batteryless crystal radio, a six-inch telescope, and an improvised diving helmet made from a cookie can with a bolted plastic sheet for vision. The helmet was supplied with air through a garden hose powered by three tire pumps connected together.

== University ==
=== Undergraduate ===
Cook first studied at Brigham Young University before transferring to the University of Utah to study physics. In the spring of 1941, he began working as a laboratory assistant at the university and graduated later that year.

=== The war years ===
As a physics major during World War II, Cook was recruited to work at the Radiation Laboratory at MIT, where he was assigned to the "Experimental Systems Group – 44" under Dr. James L. Lawson in the Roof Laboratory. The group focused on advanced radar problems, including signal discernibility, anti-jamming methods, short pulses, and receiver design. Its experimental systems frequently set performance standards, with members continually expanding the range of radar capabilities.

They employed S-band (10 cm wavelength) and X-band (3 cm) radar sets, each with several types of display, and later obtained a K-band set (1 cm), which was capable of resolving the structure of nearby objects such as a gasholder. Each set contained about 300 vacuum tubes, 10 to 20 adjustment knobs, and numerous interconnecting cables. Vacuum tube failures occurred nearly every day, requiring extensive troubleshooting.

The group often tracked a B-17 bomber sent from Bedford Airfield, experimenting with frequency and polarization, the use of chaff, jamming countermeasures, and evaluating whether propeller modulation of signal amplitude could distinguish friendly from hostile aircraft.

==== MIT Rocket Research Society ====
Cook was elected president of the Rocket Research Society, a special-interest club at the Radiation Laboratory.

Although the American Rocket Society in New York had suspended activities during the war, the MIT group continued experimenting with liquid-propellant rockets. Cook built a portable test stand from a wooden box, which included a thrust gauge, fuel and oxidizer tanks, valves with long control rods, and an electric ignition system. Together with Bob Smith and other members, he built rocket motors from materials such as steel, aluminum, ceramics, and even silver coins, using the lathes and facilities of the MIT Student Model Shop.

Members obtained liquid oxygen from the nearby Arthur D. Little Company, which was developing a portable military LOX generator and discarding excess product. The group transported the liquid oxygen in five-gallon steel cans insulated with fiber mat. In one of their most successful tests, a rocket motor produced a ten-foot flame with standing shock waves, driving the thrust gauge off-scale for more than ten seconds. However, the aluminum motor burned out and ignited the test stand, which they extinguished with a Pyrene fire extinguisher. The carbon tetrachloride extinguishing agent produced phosgene and chlorine gases, which corroded the metal equipment.

With liquid oxygen still remaining, the group conducted a controlled explosion. The blast propelled a wooden board 50 feet into the air and embedded gravel in the chest of the person lighting the fuse, despite Cook's safety precautions. The incident was later exaggerated in MIT's humor magazine Voo Doo, which portrayed Cook as the nonchalant "Lon Crook".

In spring 1945, news arrived of German V-2 missile attacks on Britain. The German Rocket Society, supported by the government, had advanced far beyond American efforts, continuing the work of Robert Goddard. Their large rockets were used for military purposes, which Cook found disheartening. He subsequently lost interest in rocketry until the creation of NASA. Anticipating his departure from Cambridge, he resigned as president of the MIT Rocket Research Society and was succeeded by Robert Kraichnan, who later became prominent in the study of general relativity.

=== Master of Science ===
In the fall of 1945, Cook received a graduate assistantship at Penn State and began work on a master's degree. During his second year, he was appointed to teach Professor Weber's junior-level thermal laboratory course. Cook read extensively in the Physics Library on gravitational topics, developed a thesis plan, and conducted experiments using an Eötvös torsion balance, a highly sensitive gravity-sensing instrument owned by the Geophysics Department in the Mineral Industries Building. Professor Sylvain Pirson was impressed with the modifications Cook made to improve the sensitivity of the balance and with his administration of the course. However, Professor Duncan, the department head, advised him that due to difficulties in advanced mathematical physics courses, it was recommended that he graduate with the master's degree and not continue further.

Cook graduated in 1947 at age 29. After returning home, he met L. V. S. Roos of Texaco, who headed a seismic prospecting crew in Utah, and was hired as an assistant recorder at $300 per month. Each morning, the eight-member crew traveled with a recording truck, a drill rig, and a water tanker to survey sites. The drill team bored three-inch holes up to 150 feet deep, where dynamite charges were placed. Cables and geophones were laid out in a radius of about 1,000 feet from the recording truck. After a preliminary charge was set off to "spring" the hole, the main shot was fired, requiring careful sequencing of switches. Because each hole could be used only once, accuracy and precision were critical. Cook was soon promoted for obtaining high-quality data.

With his master's degree, Cook was regarded as a specialist by visiting Texaco officials and by Roos, who suggested he might advance to crew chief or join the laboratory staff in Houston. These early successes, combined with the support of his family, helped restore his confidence.

=== PhD ===
In late 1947, Cook received a telegram from Professor Sylvain Pirson at Penn State offering him a position as a research assistant in the Geophysics Department with a salary of $170 per month and the opportunity to pursue a doctorate in geophysics. With tuition costs nominal and fieldwork in colder weather becoming less practical, Cook accepted the offer and re-enrolled at Penn State. He moved back into the Graduate Club and entered the PhD program. He was placed in charge of the earthquake seismograph station, where he learned to operate the equipment, analyze the records, and send reports to Washington. At Pirson's request, he built the department's first vertical-component seismometer, which he connected to a visible-ink recorder in the department offices, eliminating the need for photographic development to monitor earthquakes.

During the winter of 1949, Cook attempted to extend his master's work by testing for a tangential gravitational field—a hypothetical effect purported to arise around a rotating body. He arranged to use the large turbine rotors at the Westinghouse Plant Apparatus Division near Pittsburgh, setting up an Eötvös torsion balance on the factory floor while the rotors were balanced at 3,600 rpm. Despite the stability of the cast-iron plate flooring, vibrations and thermal fluctuations hindered his measurements. Attempts to dampen interference, such as filling the instrument with alcohol, introduced further instabilities. On his final visit, Cook was approached by Westinghouse engineer Joseph Slepian, who questioned the theoretical basis of the experiment and noted that the effect was not predicted by general relativity. Unable to defend the hypothesis, Cook abandoned the project.

At Pirson's request, Cook also built a model oil well with an electric logging system, producing data that Pirson encouraged him to publish. Cook's article, Laboratory Tests of Electrolog Resistivity Interpretation, appeared in The Producers Monthly. On the basis of this work, Pirson nominated Cook for membership in Sigma Xi, the national scientific research society, of which he remained a lifelong member.

Pirson later arranged for Cook to assume a research project sponsored by the Penn Grade Crude Association, a consortium of oil firms in northwestern Pennsylvania. Cook was promoted to research associate with a salary of $300 per month. Along with another associate, Bacon, he assumed responsibility for teaching all of the department's geophysics courses; Bacon taught most classes, while Cook taught general geochemistry during the 1948–49 academic year. Pirson subsequently left Penn State for an industry position in Tulsa, Oklahoma, a departure that was widely regretted within the department.

As part of the Penn Grade project, Cook conducted fieldwork in the oilfields near Bradford, Pennsylvania. These fields, known for producing high-quality petroleum refined into brands such as Quaker State and Pennzoil, were largely aging operations with equipment 30–50 years old. Cook observed drilling and logging practices and conceived an improved electric logging method based on thin-sheet current paths controlled by "shielding-current" electrodes, similar to Kelvin potential shields. Although his model showed significantly improved vertical resolution, he discovered that similar methods had already been developed by other inventors and by Schlumberger, which was involved in related patent litigation.

==== Thesis ====
With the government offering favorable purchase guarantees for newly discovered uranium, aerial surveys for radioactive ore became an area of growing interest. Cook selected airborne detection of surface radioactivity as his dissertation topic. He examined questions such as detection limits, flight altitude and speed, minimum ore body size, attenuation by overburden and atmosphere, and interference from cosmic rays and natural background radiation. While many answers could be derived from theoretical calculations, Cook sought experimental verification.

The Geophysics Department had recently acquired a portable Geiger counter, which Cook used to measure gamma radiation from rock samples collected at the Mauch Chunk carnotite outcrop. He also profiled a uranium ore stockpile at a refinery in Rifle, Colorado, demonstrating detectability at distances up to a quarter mile. Recognizing the limitations of Geiger counters for airborne surveys, he experimented with a large Geiger–Müller tube and constructed supporting circuits. Using hydrogen-filled balloons from the Meteorology Department, he lifted detectors up to 300 feet to measure gamma radiation from ore boxes, the Mauch Chunk deposit, and a small radium sample borrowed from a hospital. These experiments, carried out in 1950–51, formed the basis of his dissertation.

Cook's thesis, An Analysis of Airborne Surveying for Surface Radioactivity, was over 100 pages long and included 29 figures. It was typed in triplicate by his wife, Vi, and accepted by his committee.

During this time, Cook also developed and taught a new course on oil well logging, covering techniques such as electrical resistivity, self-potential, gamma-ray, neutron, and sonic velocity logging. He attempted to design a gravity gradiometer for rock-density logging, but initial experiments showed that rotation effects mimicked gravitational gradients, making the approach impractical without stabilization.

In 1951, Cook became the first person to earn a PhD in geophysics from Penn State. By this time he had published three papers challenging conventional thinking: Laboratory Tests of Electrolog Resistivity Interpretation, Characteristics of Reservoir Models by Resistivity Logging, and Can Gravity Be Abolished? His dissertation was also published in Geophysics, the leading journal in the field.

== Professional life ==
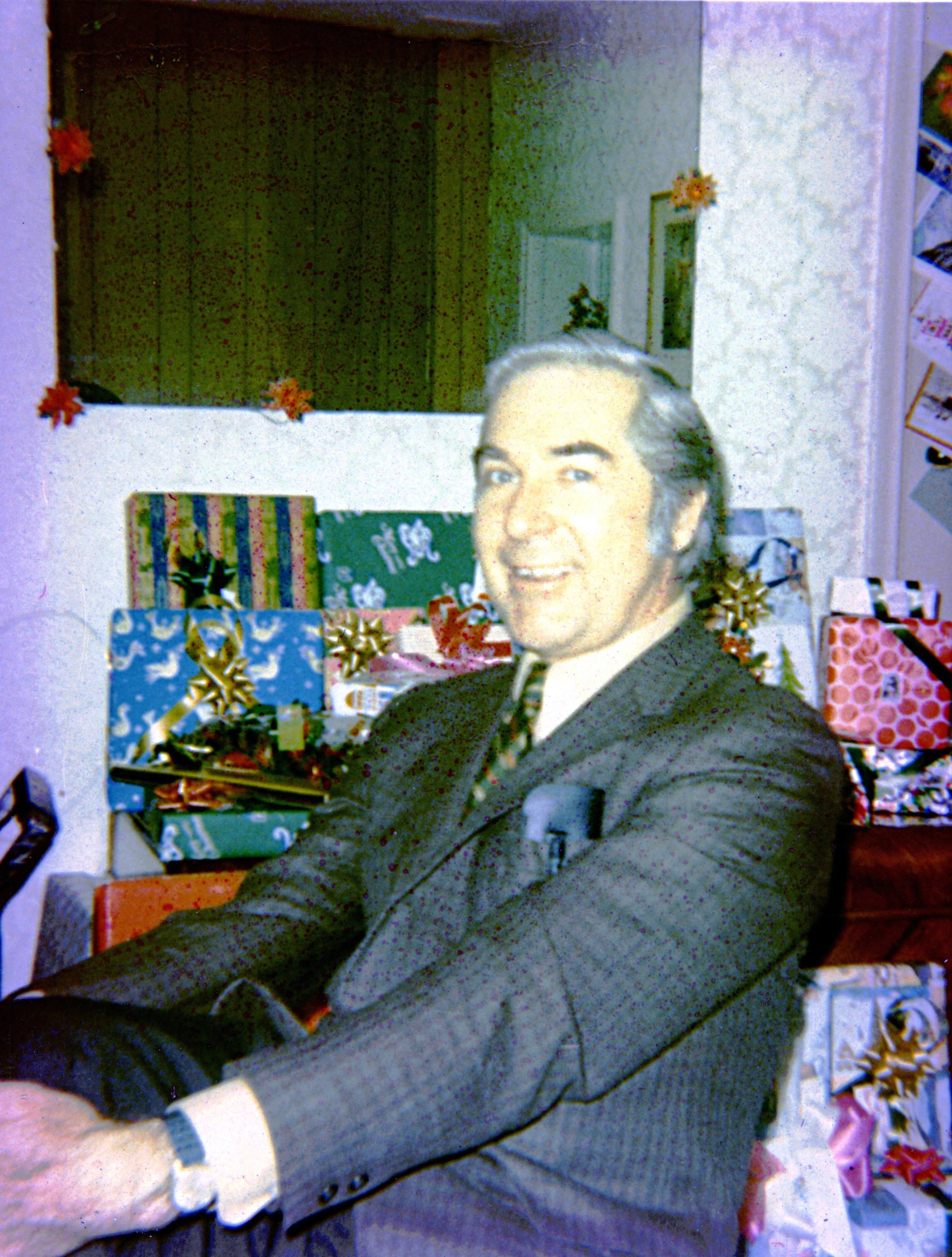
John Call Cook, December 1971

=== Finding employment ===
With his education nearly complete, Cook wrote letters offering his services to several oil companies and laboratories, which were the natural employers of geophysicists. His wife, Vi, preferred a warmer climate, so he focused on opportunities in the subtropical Southwest. He received five invitations to interviews in the spring of 1951.

In Tulsa, at the Stanolind Oil Company where Dr. Pirson worked, Cook interviewed with Dr. Dan Silverman, Chief Geophysicist. Although the meeting went well, he did not receive a formal offer. In Dallas, the Magnolia Petroleum Company provided a full day of interviews with several laboratory heads and later extended the highest offer, at $525 per month. In Houston, Texaco conducted a brief interview and offered $450 per month. At the Shell Oil Company laboratory near Houston, an interviewer posed a technical question involving the binomial theorem, which Cook could not answer at the time; no offer was extended.

In San Antonio, Cook met Bill Mussen, head of Geophysics at the Southwest Research Institute, who presented the institute's new organization and a project involving the evaluation of oil-finding inventions. After discussions, the institute offered Cook $500 per month. Despite some personal reservations, he accepted the position.

=== Southwest Research Institute ===
The Southwest Research Institute (SwRI) was founded by Tom Slick, an heir of an oil wildcatter, on a ranch west of San Antonio. Slick, an idealist, sought to provide a permanent asset to the region in recognition of what it had given to his father. He donated the land, several buildings, and about one million dollars for initial operations. SwRI was, and remains, a nonprofit organization similar to a university, but sustains itself through research contracts with government and industry.

==== The Bulletin ====
Cook's initial assignment was to manage a bulletin service titled New and Unorthodox Methods of Petroleum Exploration. The service was supported by six oil companies, which received the periodic bulletins on a confidential and proprietary basis. It was expected that "new" oil-finding methods would be referred to the bulletin by client companies for study, but this rarely occurred. Instead, Cook actively sought out unconventional techniques by pursuing leads from research publications and advertisements in oil and gas trade journals. He met with proponents to observe their ideas and equipment in practice, traveled throughout the western United States, and attended geophysical and petroleum industry conventions.

Cook also served as president of the San Antonio Geophysical Society for one year and worked on the national convention of the Society of Exploration Geophysicists (SEG). He published several papers in the SEG's journal Geophysics, which provided a venue for disseminating his findings on exploration methods.

At one point, local lawyers requested SwRI provide a physicist as an expert witness in an automobile accident case. Cook was appointed and successfully challenged the testimony of an opposing expert. The lawyers won the case and compensated Cook with $500. Although he was later approached for similar cases, his supervisor, Bill Mussen, objected, and Cook declined further legal work.

To continue teaching, Cook taught mathematics at San Antonio College for two years, including trigonometry, analytical geometry, and calculus. While the college invited him to continue, he chose to focus on his research.

Over three years, Cook improved the bulletin's composition and printing and conducted extensive analyses of unconventional techniques considered potentially viable by some oil companies. These included Surface geochemistry, Gamma-ray profiling, Radoil (profiles of radio wave strength), and Elfiex (a system generating and measuring sub-audio electric waves in the ground). Cook observed field surveys, studied relevant theory and results, and sometimes performed independent model and field experiments. His principal conclusion was that the subsurface is difficult to investigate by natural physical processes, and that conventional seismic reflection remained the most effective method available.

Cook also studied variations of radio-wave profiling. While many proponents believed their approaches produced anomalies correlated with petroleum deposits, Cook found such correlations difficult to demonstrate. Similar ambiguities had appeared in earlier surface geochemistry and radioactivity profiling studies. In one bulletin, he conducted a statistical analysis of oil discovery probabilities, concluding that virtually any method—including random guessing—would often appear successful when predicting "no oil," since most drilled wells proved dry.

Some unconventional approaches verged on pseudoscience. Cook investigated proponents who employed unscientific terminology or unusual devices, such as dowsing rods with razor blades. Others claimed special or secret powers. Cook evaluated these claims through performance tests but found none supported by evidence. He included his assessments in the bulletin and sent copies to the claimants. Despite his findings, many continued to promote their methods.

After three years, Cook and Mussen concluded that the bulletin service was unlikely to identify promising techniques and decided to end the program. Cook published a summary in Geophysics and issued three bound volumes of the bulletin for client companies.

As the bulletin concluded, Mussen secured a contract with the United States Army Corps of Engineers (Fort Belvoir, Virginia) to develop methods for detecting buried nonmetallic land mines. Cook led this work for the next three years. Classified as Confidential, the project utilized Cook's existing security clearance. He investigated several approaches, including an electric-current technique with magnetic sensing, thermal radiation detection with a flake-thermistor detector, and acoustic/seismic methods developed with technician Joe Wormser. While one seismic technique showed some promise, no method fully overcame the problem of false anomalies caused by ground variations. The reports were declassified 18 years later, and Cook subsequently published a research paper on the subject.

== Patents ==
- US# 2,252,552 - Luminescent Coating Issued August 12, 1941.
- US# 2,372,359 - Luminescent Target Issued March 27, 1945.
- US# 2,461,144 - Electrical Storage Device (memory) Issued Feb 8, 1949.
- US# 2,885,633 - Electrical Crevasse Detector Issued May 5, 1959. The prototype was used in Greenland and Antarctica during the International Geophysical Year.
- US# 3,717,864 - Periodic Event Detector System Issued February 20, 1973.
- US# 4,004,268 - In-line Stress/Strain Detector Issued January 18, 1977.
- US# 4,012,649 - Piezoelectric Stress/Strain Intrusion Detectors Issued March 15, 1977.

== Associations ==
- Local Section President, Senior Member, American Astronautical Society
- Local Section President, Society of Exploration Geophysicists
- Local Section President, Sigma Xi: The Scientific Research Society
- Member, Sigma Pi Sigma
- Member, American Geophysical Union

== Publications ==
- Laboratory Tests of Electrolog Resistivity Interpretation John C. Cook, The Producers Monthly, Volume 13, No. 1, January, 1949, Pages 97–107.
- Characteristics of Reservoir Models by Resistivity Logging John C. Cook, The Producers Monthly, Volume 14, No. 5, October 27, 1949, Pages 24–28.
- Can Gravity Be Abolished? John C. Cook, Mineral Industries, Volume 19, No. 6, March 1950, Lead article, Penn State College.

NOTE: On December 1, 1949, the Gravity Research Foundation of New Boston, NH, which operates in connection with the Sir Isaac Newton Library of the Babson Institute, gave three awards for the best 2,000 word essays on the possibilities of discovering some partial insulator, reflector, or absorber of gravity waves. The contest was open to professors, assistant professors, instructors, or members of the senior class of any listed college, and others who were especially interested in the subject. There were 88 essays submitted, and the essay "Can Gravity Be Abolished?" submitted by Cook won third award. (and $250)

- An Analysis of Airborne Surveying for Surface Radioactivity John C. Cook, Doctoral Thesis, Division of Geophysics and Geochemistry, Pennsylvania State University. Also published in Geophysics, Volume 17, No. 4, August 1951, Pages 687–706.
- New and Unorthodox Methods of Petroleum Exploration John C. Cook, Three-volume book, Southwest Research Institute, 1952.
- Scintillation Counters and Airborne Prospecting John C. Cook, Conference - Uranium Prospecting series, March 1955, Pages 28–33.
- An Electrical Crevasse Detector John C. Cook, Geophysics, Volume 17, No. 4, October, 1956, Pages 1055–1070.
- Some Observations in a Northwest Greenland Crevasse John C. Cook, American Geophysical Union Transactions, Volume 37, No. 6, December, 1956, Pages 715–718.
- Instruction Manual for Electrical Crevasse Detector, Engineering Test Model (Experimental) No. 2A, For Antarctic Use By: Task Force 43 U.S. Navy John C. Cook, Southwest Research Institute, Contract# Nby-13001, SwRI Project # 14-659-6, July 19, 1957.
- The Design of a Crevasse Detector for Polar Exploration John C. Cook, Journal of the Franklin Institute, Volume 264, Issue 5, November 1957, Lead article, Pages 361–378.
- Summary of Work of the U.S. I.G.Y. Airborne Traverse Unit, 1957-1958 John C. Cook, Symposium on Antarctic Research, International Geophysical Year, The Topography of the Sub-Glacial Continent, February 18, 1958, pp 6–8
- Preliminary Airlifted Geophysical Explorations in Antarctica John C. Cook, Glaciological Report Series, International Geophysical Year, no. 1, August 1958, pp II-1 – II-12
- Some Unorthodox Petroleum Exploration Methods John C. Cook, Geophysics, Vol. 24, No. 1, February 1959, pp 142–154.
- Electrostatic Lift for Space Vehicles John C. Cook, Ballistic Missile and Space Technology, vol II, 1960, pp 203–241, Academic Press NY.
- RF Electrical Properties of Salty Ice and Frozen Earth John C. Cook, Journal of Geophysical Research, vol 65, no. 6, June 1960, pp 1767–1771.
- Calorimeter and Accessories for Very High Thermal Radiation Flux Measurements John C. Cook, (Herman Levin, Sandia Corp., co-author), Review of Scientific Instruments, American Institute of Physics, vol 31, no. 10, October 1960, pp 1160–1161.
- Proposed Monocycle-Pulse VHF Radar for Airborne Ice and Snow Measurement John C. Cook, Communication and Electronics, no. 51, and Journal of the American Institute of Electrical Engineers, Transactions on Communication and Electronics, vol 79, November 1960, Lead article, pp 588–594
- The Gravitation Phenomenon and its Energy Implications John C. Cook, Medical and Biological Aspects of the Energies of Space, 1961, pp 154–175.
- Some Operating Characteristics of Flash-pumped Ruby Lasers John C. Cook, Proceedings of the IRE (Institute of Radio Engineers), vol 49, no. 10, October 1961.
- A Scanning Radiation Sampler for Imaging Furnaces John C. Cook, Temperature: Its Measurement and Control in Science and Industry, Applied Methods and Instruments, vol III, part 2, 1962, pp 1051–1061
- Magnetic Effects and Properties of Typical Topsoils John C. Cook, Journal of Geophysical Research, vol 67, no. 2, February, 1962, pp 815–828 (Stanley L. Carts Jr, US Army Engineering R&D Labs, co-author).
- Geochemical and other 'Auras of Influence' and the Detection of Underground Objects John C. Cook, Proceedings - First Symposium on Detection of Underground Objects, Materials and Properties, US Army Engineering R&D Labs, Ft. Belvoir, VA, March 1962, pp 1–26.
- Output Power and Possible Continuous Operation of Ruby Lasers John C. Cook, Proceedings of the Institute of Radio Engineers, vol 50, March, 1962, pp 330–331.
- On Measuring the Phase Velocity of an Oscillating Gravitational Field John C. Cook, Journal of the Franklin Institute, vol 273, no. 6, June 1962, Lead article, pp 453–471.
- Monocycle Radar Pulses as Environmental Probes John C. Cook, Proceedings of the Second Symposium on Remote Sensing of Environment, October 1962, pp 223–231, Institute of Science and Technology, University of Michigan, Ann Arbor.
- A 400-KW Pressurized Arc Imaging Furnace John C. Cook, A.D.L. Conference on Imaging Techniques, Cambridge, MA, Thermal Imaging Techniques, October 4, 1962, pp 55–76, Plenum Press, NY.
- Seismic Reconnaissance of an Ice-Covered Antarctic Sea John C. Cook, British Journal of Glacilology, Cambridge, vol 4, 1963, pp 559–568.
- Fast-Response Thermistor Probes for Temperature Microstructure Studies at Sea John C. Cook, The Review of Scientific Instruments, vol 34, no. 5, May 1963, pp 496–499 (Kern E. Kenyon, Scripps Inst. of Oceanography, co-author).
- Supplementary Gravity and Magnetic Data for McMurdo Sound and Victoria Land, Antarctica John C. Cook, Journal of Geophysical Research, vol 68, no. 10, May 15, 1963, pp 3331–3333.
- Progress in Mapping Underground Solution Cavities with Seismic Shear Waves John C. Cook, Society of Mining Engineers, Transactions, AIME vol. 229, March 1964, pp26–32.
- Seismic Mapping of Underground Cavities Using Reflection Amplitudes John C. Cook, Geophysics, vol XXX (30), no. 4, August 1965, pp 527–538.
- Seismic Delineation of Solution Cavities John C. Cook, Second Symposium on Salt, Northern Ohio Geological Society, Vol 2, 1966, pp 131–139.
- The Seismometer as a Hydrophone John C. Cook, Bulletin of the Seismological Society of America, vol 56, no. 5, October 1966, pp1177–1184.
- An Airborne, Ground-Penetrating Radar John C. Cook, ElectroMagnetic Exploration of the Moon, Proceedings of the Symposium, NASA-AMES Research Center, June 11, 1968.
- A Capacitive Coupling Electrical Method for Lunar Subsurface Exploration John C. Cook, ElectroMagnetic Exploration of the Moon, Proceedings of the Symposium, NASA-AMES Research Center, June 11, 1968.
- Traveling Seismic Soil Coupler Research John C. Cook, US Army Mobility Equipment Research and Development Laboratories Contract No. DAAK 02-68-C-0211, Technical Report No. 68-50, December 1968.
- NQR Borehole Logging for Evaporite Minerals John C. Cook, Third Symposium on Salt, vol 2, pp353–356, Northern Ohio Geological Society, 1970.
- Electromagnetic Exploration Within Salt Domes John C. Cook, Third Symposium on Salt, vol 2, pp386–390, Northern Ohio Geological Society (J.R. Clements, co-author), 1970.
- Ground Motion from Sonic Booms John C. Cook, Journal of Aircraft, vol 7, no. 2, March 1970, pp126–129 (Tom T. Goforth, co-author)
- Introductory Remarks John C. Cook, IEEE Transactions on Geoscience Electronics, vol GE-8, no. 3, July 1970, pp117
- RF Electrical Properties of Bituminous Coal Samples John C. Cook. Geophysics, vol. 35, No. 6, December 1970, pp. 1079–1085.
- Rapid Measurement of Subsurface Moisture and Frost by the 'Capacitive' Method, from Landed Planetary Probes and Surface Vehicles John C. Cook, Geological Problems in Lunar and Planetary Research, AAS, 1971.
- Experience with an Infrared Ocean-Wave Meter John C. Cook, Presented at the Fourth Annual Offshore Conference, Houston, TX, Paper# OTC 1512, pp I-14 – I-20, May 3, 1972.
- Seeing Through Rock with Radar John C. Cook, Presented at the North American Conference on Rapid Excavation and Tunneling, Chicago Illinois, June 5, 1972.
- Radar Exploration Through Rock in Advance of Mining John C. Cook, Society of Mining Engineers, AIME Transactions, vol 254, June 1973, pp 140–146
- Semi-Remote Acoustic, Electric, and Thermal Sensing of Small Buried Nonmetallic Objects John C. Cook, IEEE Transactions on GeoScience Electronics, Vol. GE-11, No. 3, July 1973, pp 135–152, (J.J. Wormser, co-author).
- Yes, we can locate solution cavity boundaries John C. Cook, Fourth Symposium On Salt, vol 2, pp 27–31, Northern Ohio Geological Society, 1974.
- How to Locate Water Hazards in Salt Mine John C. Cook, Fourth Symposium On Salt, vol 2, pp 33–40, Northern Ohio Geological Society, 1974.
- Status of Ground-Probing Radar and Some Recent Experience John C. Cook, "Subsurface Exploration for Underground Excavation and Heavy Construction", at the Proceedings of Engineering Foundation Conference, of the American Society of Civil Engineers, held at Henniker, NH, August 1974.
- Radar Transparencies of Mine and Tunnel Rocks John C. Cook. Geophysics, Vol. 40, No. 5, October 1975, pp. 865–885, 1975.
- Geophysical Measurement System for Delineation of Channel Sands John C. Cook, US Department of the Interior, Bureau of Mines, Contract No. HO242014, Technical Report No. 76-2, May 1976.
- Geological Radar Experiments In S.E. Australia John C. Cook, Technical Report, under contract to BHP Mineral Exploration, Australian Iron & Steel Pty, Ltd, Clutha Development Co., Ltd, Esso Australia, Ltd, Joint Coal Board, CSIRO (Mineral Physics), Bellambi Coal Co, and MacQuarie University, August 1976.
- Borehole-Radar Exploration in a Coal Seam John C. Cook, Geophysics, vol 42, no 6, October 1977, pp 1254–1257.
- Electromagnetic Resonance Borehole Assay Logging John C. Cook, US Department of the Interior, Bureau of Mines, Contract No. JO265024, Technical Report No. 77-10, January 1978.
- The Memoirs of John C. Cook John C. Cook, self-published, January 28, 2005.
