= Tellu =

Tellu is a given name. People with this name include:

- Tellu Turkka (born 1969), Finnish fiddler and singer
- Tellu (character), character from Sailor Moon

== See also ==
- Tellus
