= Geoengineering (disambiguation) =

Geoengineering (climate engineering) is deliberate large-scale interventions in the Earth's climate system.

Geoengineering may also refer to:

- Geological engineering, a hybrid discipline that comprises elements of civil engineering, mining engineering, petroleum engineering, and earth science
- Engineering geology, the application of the geological sciences to engineering study
- Geotechnical engineering, the branch of civil engineering concerned with the engineering behavior of earth materials
- Geophysical engineering, the application of geophysics to the engineering design of facilities, including roads, tunnels, and mines

== See also ==
- Environmental engineering
- Geoprofessions
- Terraforming
