= Bulletin of the AMS =

Bulletin of the AMS may refer to:

- Bulletin of the American Mathematical Society, published the American Mathematical Society
- Bulletin of the American Meteorological Society, published by the American Meteorological Society
- Bulletin of the Australian Mathematical Society, published by the Australian Mathematical Society
