= International Union of Speleology =

Scientific non-governmental organization

- Abbreviation: UIS
- Formation: 1965; 61 years ago
- Type: INGO
- Headquarters: Titov trg 2, Postojna, Slovenia
- Region served: Worldwide
- Members: 58 countries
- Official language: English, French, German, Spanish, and Russian
- President: Nadja Zupan-Hajna (Slovenia)
- Vice-President: Zdeněk Motyčka (Czech Republic), Nivaldo Colzato (Brazil)
- General Secretary: Johannes Mattes (Austria)
- Parent organization: International Science Council (ISC)
- Website: UIS Official website

International Union of Speleology (French: Union Internationale de Spéléologie, UIS) is a scientific non-governmental organization dedicated to the international promotion and coordination of cave and karst research. Founded in 1965, UIS is a member of the International Science Council in Paris and cooperates with UNESCO. In 2021–2022, UIS organized the International Year of Caves and Karst.

== History ==
In 1949, the international speleological community, then mostly Europeans, agreed in a meeting in Valence-sur-Rhone, France, to hold international speleological congresses beginning in Paris in 1953. These efforts continued during the Cold War. At the 4th International Congress of Speleology in Postojna/Ljubljana in 1965, a group of speleologists proposed to establish an association that would bring together scientists and cavers on both sides of the Iron Curtain and coordinate their activities. At the closing ceremony of this congress, the UIS was finally launched. However, the confirmation of its organization and statutes did not take place until the following congress in Stuttgart in 1969.

=== International Congresses of Speleology ===
Meetings have been held in the following years:

- 1953: Paris (France)
- 1958: Bari (Italy)
- 1961: Vienna, Obertraun, Salzburg (Austria)
- 1965: Postojna, Ljubljana (Yugoslavia)
- 1969: Stuttgart (Germany)
- 1973: Olomouc (Czechoslovakia)
- 1977: Sheffield (Great Britain)
- 1981: Bowling Green (United States)
- 1986: Barcelona (Spain)
- 1989: Budapest (Hungary)
- 1993: Beijing (China)
- 1997: La Chaux-des-Fonds (Switzerland)
- 2001: Brasilia (Brazil)
- 2005: Kalamos (Greece)
- 2009: Kerrville (United States)
- 2013: Brno (Czech Republic)
- 2017: Sydney (Australia)
- 2022: Le Bourget-du-Lac (France)

== Structure ==
The main body of the UIS is the General Assembly, which is composed of delegates from 58 member countries and meets every four years on the occasion of the International Congresses on Speleology. The voting delegates to the General Assembly are sent by the national scientific societies and associations.

At present, the UIS is presided over by a Bureau, which consists of an executive committee of five officers (President, two Vice Presidents, General Secretary, and Treasurer), who are joined on the Bureau by seven Adjunct Secretaries. Each Bureau member must be from a different country. These Bureau members are elected at the General Assemblies for a period of four years. The Bureau is assisted by an Advisory Committee, consisting mostly of the past presidents and other past officers.

UIS activities take place in a number of commissions and working groups, such as the UIS Informatics Commission formed in 1986, the Speleotherapy Commission or the Karst Hydrogeology and Speleogenesis Commission. Other UIS undertakings include the Speleological Abstracts (SA/BBS), an annual survey of the world's speleological literature, or the Karst Information Portal (KIP), an open-access digital library on karst environments.

=== List of presidents ===
Of the 12 past presidents in office, 10 have been male:

- 1965-1973: Bernard Gèze (France)
- 1973-1981: Arrigo A. Cigna (Italy)
- 1981-1986: Adolfo Eraso Romero (Spain)
- 1986-1989: Derek C. Ford (Canada)
- 1989-1993: Hubert Trimmel (Austria)
- 1993-1997: Paolo Forti (Italy)
- 1997-2001: Julia Mary James (Australia)
- 2002-2005: José Ayrton Labegalini (Brazil)
- 2005-2013: Andrew Eavis (Great Britain)
- 2013-2017: Kyung Sik Woo (Republic of Korea)
- 2017-2022: George Veni (United States)
- since 2022: Nadja Zupan-Hajna (Slovenia)

=== List of general secretaries ===
Former general secretaries:

- 1965-1969: Albert Anavy (Lebanon)
- 1969-1989: Hubert Trimmel (Austria)
- 1989-1993: Camile Ek (Belgium)
- 1993-2005: Pavel Bosák (Czech Republic)
- 2005-2022: Fadi Nader (Lebanon)
- since 2022: Johannes Mattes (Austria)

== Publications ==
Since 1978, UIS publishes the International Journal of Speleology.
