= Atlantic Geoscience Society =

Canadian scientific association

The Atlantic Geoscience Society
- Société Géoscientifique de l'Atlantique
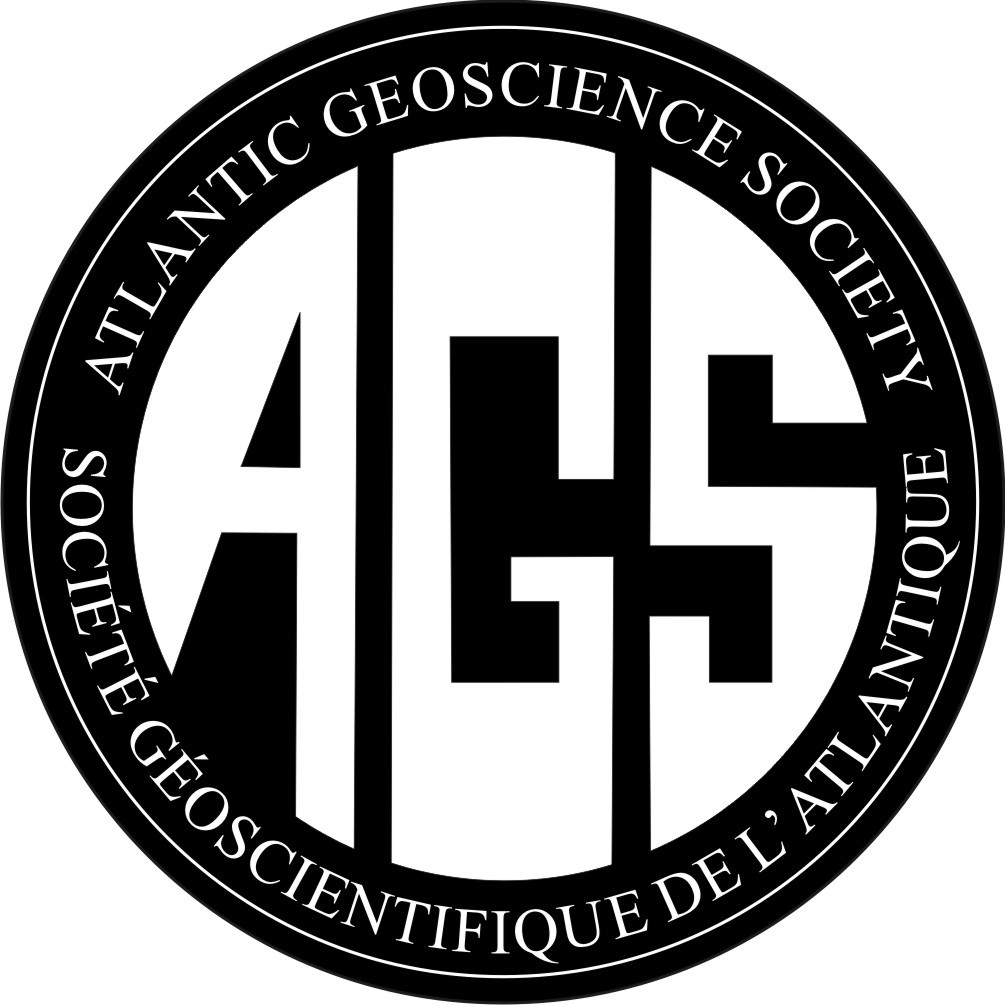
- Formation: April 11, 1972; 54 years ago
- Headquarters: Acadia University, Nova Scotia, Canada
- Members: 244 Members
- President: Prof Anne Marie Ryan
- Website: Official website

The Atlantic Geoscience Society (AGS; French: Société Géoscientifique de l'Atlantique), is a scientific association for earth scientists working or interested in the Atlantic provinces. The membership comprises professional geologists in industry and academia, students, and interested members of the public. The society is affiliated with the Geological Association of Canada, the Canadian Society of Petroleum Geologists, and the American Association of Petroleum Geologists, and is a member of the Canadian Federation of Earth Sciences.

The society publishes the geological journal Atlantic Geology.

== Recent presidents ==
The presidents since 2010:

- 2010–2011: Grant Ferguson, Saint Francis Xavier University
- 2011–2012: Jim Walker, Department of Natural Resources (New Brunswick)
- 2012–2013: Elisabeth Kosters, Wolfville, Nova Scotia
- 2013–2014: Grant Wach, Dalhousie University
- 2014–2015: Cliff Stanley, Acadia University
- 2015–2016: President: John Calder, Nova Scotia Department of Natural Resources
- 2016–2017: Bob Grantham, Stewiacke
- 2017–2018: Robin Adair, Zorayda Consulting Ltd.
- 2018–2019: Lynn Dafoe, Geological Survey of Canada - Atlantic
- 2019–2020: Martha Grantham, Stewiacke
- 2020–2021: Dave Lentz, University of New Brunswick
- 2021–2022: Anne Marie Ryan, Dalhousie University

== Medals and awards ==
The Atlantic Geoscience Society recognizes geological contributions with two individual awards:

- Gesner Medal
- Laing Ferguson Distinguished Service Award

Achievements at its annual colloquium are recognized with other awards:

- Rob Raeside Award for Best Undergraduate Student Poster
- Graham Williams Award for Best Student Poster
- Sandra Barr Award for Best Graduate Oral Presentation
- Rupert MacNeill Award for Best Student Paper
