= Journal of Hydrometeorology =

- Discipline: Hydrometeorology
- Language: English
- Edited by: Wade T. Crow

Publication details
- History: 2000–present
- Publisher: American Meteorological Society (United States)
- Frequency: Bimonthly
- Open access: Delayed, 1 year
- Impact factor: 4.349 (2020)

Standard abbreviations
- ISO 4: J. Hydrometeorol.

Indexing
- ISSN: 1525-755X (print); 1525-7541 (web)

Links
- Journal homepage; Online archive

The Journal of Hydrometeorology is a scientific journal published by the American Meteorological Society. It covers the modeling, observing, and forecasting of processes related to water and energy fluxes and storage terms, including interactions with the boundary layer and lower atmosphere, and including processes related to precipitation, radiation, and other meteorological inputs.

== See also ==
- List of scientific journals in earth and atmospheric sciences
