= Current Science =

English-language academic journal devoted to science

- Discipline: Multidisciplinary
- Language: English
- Edited by: S. K. Satheesh

Publication details
- History: 1932–present
- Publisher: Current Science Association in collaboration with the Indian Academy of Sciences (India)
- Frequency: Semi-monthly
- Open access: Yes
- Impact factor: 1.1 (2023)

Standard abbreviations
- ISO 4: Curr. Sci.

Indexing
- CODEN: CUSCAM
- ISSN: 0011-3891
- LCCN: 44042917
- OCLC no.: 01565678

Links
- Journal homepage

Current Science is an English-language peer-reviewed multidisciplinary scientific journal. It was established in 1932 and is published by the Current Science Association along with the Indian Academy of Sciences. According to the Journal Citation Reports, the journal has a 2023 impact factor of 1.1. Current Science is indexed by Web of Science, Current Contents, Geobase, Chemical Abstracts, IndMed and Scopus. The editor-in-chief is S. K. Satheesh of the Indian Institute of Science, Bengaluru.
