= Meteorological Monographs =

- Discipline: Atmospheric sciences (meteorology)
- Language: English

Publication details
- Publisher: American Meteorological Society (United States)
- Frequency: Irregular
- Open access: After 5 years

Standard abbreviations
- ISO 4: Meteorol. Monogr.

Indexing
- ISSN: 0065-9401 (print); 1943-3646 (web)

Links
- Journal homepage

Meteorological Monographs is a peer-reviewed monograph series published by the American Meteorological Society. The series has two parts, historical and meteorological.

== See also ==
- List of scientific journals in earth and atmospheric sciences
