= Verlag für Geowissenschaften Berlin =

Verlag für Geowissenschaften Berlin is a German scientific publisher of titles relating to the geological sciences, founded in 1998. It was originally established as a publishing arm associated with a learned society devoted to the history and historiography of geological research, the Verein Berlin-Brandenburgische Geologie-Historiker "Leopold von Buch" (in English, "Society of Berlin-Brandenburger Geologist-Historians", named after Leopold von Buch, the famous 19th-century Prussian geologist and paleontologist) co-founded the same year by the noted historian of natural sciences at Rostock University, Martin Guntau. The publisher's offices were initially based in the borough of Pankow, East Berlin, later relocating to Ahrensfelde in the adjoining Landkreis (district) of Barnim in the German state of Brandenburg. The publisher and director since its founding is Ulrich Wutzke.

The Verlag für Geowissenschaften began as the publisher of the society's new journal, Geohistorische Blätter, a half-yearly periodical containing original research papers and notices concerning the history of geology in the Berlin-Brandenburg region of Germany and beyond.

At the beginning of 2005, the Verlag für Geowissenschaften took over the publishing rights for the journal Zeitschrift für Geologische Wissenschaften from its previous publisher Akademie Verlag, a former East German scientific publishing house. Since its foundation in 1973, this journal had been a leading geological sciences publication and an official research periodical issued by the East German national geological society, the Gesellschaft für Geologische Wissenschaften. After the German reunification this society eventually merged with its West German counterpart to form the Deutschen Geologischen Gesellschaft. The society's association with the Zeitschrift für Geologische Wissenschaften formally ceased at the end of 2004 following a decision by the publication rights holder, Akademie Verlag's parent company Wiley-VCH.

In addition to journal publications Verlag für Geowissenschaften issues other monographic titles and conference proceedings in a range of subjects associated with geology.
