= Polish Limnological Society =

The Polish Limnological Society (Polish: Polskie Towarzystwo Limnologiczne (PTLim)) is a Polish scientific society that disseminates information among limnologists, those who study all aspects of lakes, including their physics, chemistry, biology, geology, and management. It was founded at the "Fifth National Limnological Conference" in 2001 and, as of 2021, has over 100 active members. In 2009 it organized the International Conference "Lakes, Reservoirs and Ponds. Impacts – Threats – Conservation" partnered with the Czech Limnological Society and Romanian Limnogeographical Association. In 2019, PLS organized the International Conference "Lakes & Reservoirs: Hot Spots in Limnology" in co-operation with the Romanian Limnogeographical Association .

PTLim publishes the scientific journal Limnological Review.
