= Czech Geological Society =

Czech non-profit organization

- Abbreviation: CGS
- Predecessor: Czechoslovak Society for Mineralogy and Geology
- Formation: 1923
- Type: NGO
- Purpose: Promotion of education, scientific research and publication
- Region served: Czech Republic
- General Secretary: Martin Ivanov
- Main organ: Annual General Meeting and Elected Council
- Website: http://www.geologickaspolecnost.cz

Czech Geological Society (Czech: Česká geologická společnost) is a non-profit organization dedicated to the advancement of the geosciences. It provides access to elements that are essential to the professional growth of earth scientists at all levels of expertise and from all sectors: academic, government, business, and industry. CGS is a member of the Czech Council of Scientific Societies and the Association of European Geological Societies (AEGS). Through the Czech National Geological Committee, CGS is also linked to the International Union of Geological Sciences. CGS takes an active role in various programs of international professional associations, such as IAGOD and IGCP.

== History ==
The Society was founded in 1923 as a Czechoslovak Society for Mineralogy and Geology.

== Membership ==
The society has about 530 members.

=== Activities ===
The Society's primary activities are organizing scientific meetings and lecture series, publishing scientific literature and organizing field excursions open to general public.

== Publications ==
The Society publishes Journal of Geosciences (formerly Časopis pro mineralogii a geologii and Journal of the Czech Geological Society), a quarterly peer-review scientific journal. Twice a year, all members of the Society receive a Bulletin with up-to-date information on seminars, exhibitions, excursions and mineral shows to take place both in the country and elsewhere in Central Europe, new books and films, and a social chronicle.

== Conferences ==
- 1997 - MAEGS-10: 10th Meeting of the Association of European Geological Societies
- 1997 - Tourmaline (1997)
- 1998 - Granite Pegmatites - Mineralogy, Petrology & Geochemistry
- 2005 - Slavonice 2005: 2nd Meeting of the CGS
- 2007 - Volary 2007: 3rd Meeting of the CGS
- 2009 - Joint meeting of SGS and CGS Bratislava 2009
- 2011 - Joint meeting of SGS and CGS Monínec 2011
