= Acta Geologica Polonica =

Scholarly journal focused on geology

- Discipline: Geology
- Language: English
- Edited by: Piotr Łuczyński

Publication details
- History: 1950–present
- Publisher: Institute of Geology University of Warsaw (Poland)
- Open access: Yes
- Impact factor: 0.983 (2020)

Standard abbreviations
- ISO 4: Acta Geol. Pol.

Indexing
- ISSN: 0001-5709 (print); 2300-1887 (web)

Links
- Journal homepage

Acta Geologica Polonica is a peer-reviewed open access scholarly journal publishing original papers on all aspects of geology. It is published by the Institute of Geology, University of Warsaw. The current editor-in-chief is Piotr Łuczyński.

Starting with 2012, access to full texts of all published articles is free.

== Abstracting and indexing ==
According to the Journal Citation Reports, the journal had a 2020 impact factor of 0.983. The journal is abstracted and indexed in:

- Essential Science Indicators
- Science Citation Index Expanded
- Zoological Record
- Scopus
