= Geologica Carpathica =

- Discipline: Geology
- Language: English

Publication details
- Former name: Geologicky Zbornik
- History: 1950–present
- Publisher: Veda, Publishing House of the Slovak Academy of Sciences (Poland)
- Open access: Yes
- Impact factor: 1.699 (2018)

Standard abbreviations
- ISO 4: Geol. Carpathica

Indexing
- ISSN: 1335-0552 (print); 1336-8052 (web)
- OCLC no.: 320412956

Links
- Journal homepage

Geologica Carpathica is a peer-reviewed open access scholarly journal publishing original research on the geology of the Carpathian-Balkanian and adjacent regions. It is an official journal of the Carpathian-Balkan Geological Association, and is co-published with the support of the Earth Science Institute of the Slovak Academy of Sciences, the Polish Geological Institute, and the Institute of Geology of the Czech Academy of Sciences.

== Abstracting and indexing ==
The journal is abstracted and indexed in:

- DOAJ
- Scopus
- Science Citation Index Expanded
- BIOSIS Previews
- Biological Abstracts
- Current Contents Physical, Chemical & Earth Sciences
- Essential Science Indicators
- Zoological Record
