= Bulletin of the Geological Society of Finland =

- Discipline: Geology
- Language: English
- Edited by: Niina Kuosmanen

Publication details
- Former name: Comptes Rendus de la Société Géologique de Finlande
- History: 1929–present
- Publisher: Geological Society of Finland (Finland)
- Frequency: Semi-annual
- Open access: Yes
- Impact factor: 1.231 (2018)

Standard abbreviations
- ISO 4: Bull. Geol. Soc. Finl.

Indexing
- ISSN: 0367-5211 (print); 1799-4632 (web)

Links
- Journal homepage

Bulletin of the Geological Society of Finland is a peer-reviewed open access scholarly journal publishing research articles and short communications in all branches of geosciences. It the official journal of the Geological Society of Finland. The current editor-in-chief is Dr. Niina Kuosmanen. From 1929 to 1967 (Volumes 1 to 39), it was known as Comptes Rendus de la Société Géologique de Finlande before changing to the current name from Volume 40 onwards to the present day.

== Abstracting and indexing ==
The journal is abstracted and indexed in:

- Biological Abstracts
- BIOSIS Previews
- DOAJ
- Essential Science Indicators
- GEOBASE
- GeoRef
- Science Citation Index Expanded
- Scopus
