= Telluric =

Telluric (from the Latin tellus, "earth") may refer to several things related to the Earth:

- Telluric current, a natural electric current in the Earth's crust
- Telluric contamination, contamination of astronomical spectra by the Earth's atmosphere (also can be referred to as Telluric lines or Telluric bands)
- Telluric compound, a compound which contains tellurium in the +6 oxidation state
- Telluric (album), a 2016 album by the Australian singer-songwriter Matt Corby
