= Journal of Iberian Geology =

- Discipline: Geology, Earth sciences
- Language: English, Spanish
- Edited by: Javier Martín-Chivelet; José López Gómez

Publication details
- Former name: Cuadernos de Geología Ibérica
- History: 1970–present
- Publisher: Universidad Complutense de Madrid (Spain)

Standard abbreviations
- ISO 4: J. Iber. Geol.

Indexing
- ISSN: 1698-6180 (print); 1886-7995 (web)

Links
- Journal homepage; Online search; Online archive

Journal of Iberian Geology (formerly Cuadernos de Geología Ibérica) is a triannual peer-reviewed scientific journal published by the Universidad Complutense de Madrid. The journal covers the field of geology and related earth sciences, primarily on issues that are relevant to the geology of the Iberian Peninsula.
