= Limnological Review =

Polish scholarly journal

- Discipline: Limnology, ecohydrology, aquatic biology, aquatic ecology, ecotoxicology, sedimentology, hydrogeology, environmental engineering
- Language: English
- Edited by: Dariusz Borowiak, Piotr Rzymski

Publication details
- Publisher: MDPI (Poland)
- Open access: Yes

Standard abbreviations
- ISO 4: Limnol. Rev.

Indexing
- ISSN: 1642-5952 (print); 2300-7575 (web)

Links
- Journal homepage

The Limnological Review is an official journal of Polish Limnological Society and covers theoretical and applied freshwater research, including such topics as limnology, ecohydrology, aquatic biology, aquatic ecology, ecotoxicology, sedimentology, hydrogeology and environmental engineering. The journal is led by two editors-in-chief: Dariusz Borowiak (University of Gdańsk) and Piotr Rzymski (Poznan University of Medical Sciences).

MDPI is now publishing the journal since 2022.
