= Episodes (journal) =

- Discipline: Geology
- Language: English
- Edited by: Jin-Yong Lee

Publication details
- History: 1978–present
- Publisher: International Union of Geological Sciences
- Frequency: Quarterly

Standard abbreviations
- ISO 4: Episodes

Indexing
- ISSN: 0705-3797 (print); 2586-1298 (web)

Links
- Journal homepage

Episodes is the quarterly journal of the International Union of Geological Sciences, published in Seoul, Korea. In circulation since 1978, Episodes is an international and interdisciplinary open access and free, both to submit and download, publication journal that covers all geoscience disciplines. Episodes includes authoritative articles that reflect global research advances, evolving trends in geoscience disciplines and concise reports on the results of international meetings, conferences, and symposia. It is a high visibility journal, and is indexed in Science Citation Index (SCI), Science Citation Index Expanded (SCIE; Web of Science), and Journal Citation Reports (JCR)/Science Edition, along with many other databases such as SCOPUS. Submitted manuscripts are peer-reviewed, and a first decision is provided to authors approximately within 30 days after submission. As of December 2024, the domain has been "repossessed by GoDaddy".

== See also ==
- List of scientific journals
- List of scientific journals in earth and atmospheric sciences
