= Bulletin of the American Meteorological Society =

- Discipline: Meteorology
- Language: English
- Edited by: Jeff Waldstreicher

Publication details
- History: 1920–present
- Publisher: American Meteorological Society (U.S.A)
- Frequency: Monthly
- Open access: All peer reviewed articles
- Impact factor: 8.766 (2020)

Standard abbreviations
- ISO 4: Bull. Am. Meteorol. Soc.

Indexing
- ISSN: 0003-0007 (print); 1520-0477 (web)

Links
- Journal homepage; Current Issue; Digital BAMS

The Bulletin of the American Meteorological Society (BAMS) is a scientific journal published by the American Meteorological Society. BAMS is the flagship magazine of AMS and publishes peer reviewed articles of interest and significance for the weather, water, and climate community as well as news, editorials, and reviews for AMS members. BAMS articles are fully open access; AMS members can also access the digital version which replicates the print issue cover-to-cover and often includes enhanced articles with audio and video.

== See also ==
- List of scientific journals
  - List of scientific journals in earth and atmospheric sciences
