= Geoprofessions =

Group of technical disciplines

"Geoprofessions" is a term coined by the Geoprofessional Business Association to connote various technical disciplines that involve engineering, earth and environmental services applied to below-ground ("subsurface"), ground-surface, and ground-surface-connected conditions, structures, or formations. The principal disciplines include, as major categories:

- geomatics engineering
- geotechnical engineering;
- geology and engineering geology;
- geological engineering;
- geophysics;
- geophysical engineering;
- environmental science and environmental engineering;
- construction-materials engineering and testing; and
- other geoprofessional services.

Each discipline involves specialties, many of which are recognized through professional designations that governments and societies or associations confer based upon a person's education, training, experience, and educational accomplishments. In the United States, engineers must be licensed in the state or territory where they practice engineering. Most states license geologists and several license environmental "site professionals." Several states license engineering geologists and recognize geotechnical engineering through a geotechnical-engineering titling act.

== Geotechnical-engineering specialties ==
Although geotechnical engineering is applied for a variety of purposes, it is essential to foundation design. As such, geotechnical engineering is applicable to every existing or new structure on the planet; every building and every highway, bridge, tunnel, harbor, airport, water line, reservoir, or other public work. Commonly, the geotechnical-engineering service comprises a study of subsurface conditions using various sampling, in-situ testing, and/or other site-characterization techniques. The instrument of professional service in those cases typically is a report through which geotechnical engineers relate the information they have been retained to provide, typically: their findings; their opinions about subsurface materials and conditions; their judgment about how the subsurface materials and conditions assumed to exist probably will behave when subjected to loads or used as building material; and their preliminary recommendations for materials usage or appropriate foundation systems, the latter based on their knowledge of a structure's size, shape, weight, etc., and the subsurface/structure interactions likely to occur.

Civil engineers, structural engineers, and architects, feasibly among other members of the project team, apply the geotechnical findings and preliminary recommendations to take the structure's design forward. They realize these preliminary recommendations are subject to change, however, because – as a matter of practical necessity related to the observational method inherent to geotechnical engineering – geotechnical engineers base their recommendations on the composition of samples taken from a tiny portion of a site whose actual subsurface conditions are unknowable before excavation, because they are hidden by earth and/or rock and/or water. For this reason, as a key component of a complete geotechnical engineering service, geotechnical engineers employ construction-materials engineering and testing (CoMET) to observe subsurface materials as they are exposed through excavation.

To help achieve economies on their clients' behalf, geotechnical engineers assign their field representatives – specially educated and trained paraprofessionals – to observe the excavated materials and the excavations themselves in light of conditions the geotechnical engineers opined to exist. When differences are discovered, the geotechnical engineers evaluate the new findings and, when necessary, modify their design and construction recommendations. Because such changes could require other members of the design and construction team to modify their designs, specifications, and proposed methods, many owners have their geotechnical engineers serve as active members of the project team from project inception to conclusion, working with others to help ensure appropriate application of geotechnical information and judgments.

In other cases, geotechnical engineering goes beyond a study and construction recommendations to include design of soil and rock structures. The most common of these are the pavements that make up our streets and highways, airport runways, and bridge and tunnel decks, among other paved improvements. Geotechnical engineers design the pavements in terms of the subgrade, subbase, and base layers of materials to be used, and the thickness and composition of each. Geotechnical engineers also design the earth-retention walls associated with structures such as levees, earthen dams, reservoirs, and landfills. In other cases, the design is applied to contain earth, via structures such as excavation-support systems and retaining walls. Sometimes referred to as geostructural engineering or geostructural design, these services are also intrinsic to hydraulic engineering, hydrogeologic engineering, coastal engineering, geologic engineering and water-resources engineering. Geotechnical-engineering design is also applied for structures such as tunnels, bridges, dams, and other structures beneath, on, or connected to the surface of the earth. Geotechnical engineering, like geology, engineering geology, and geologic engineering, also involves the specialties of rock mechanics and soil mechanics, and often requires knowledge of geotextiles and geosynthetics, as well as an array of instrumentation and monitoring equipment, to help ensure specified conditions are achieved and maintained.

Earthquake engineering and landslide detection, remediation, and prevention are geoprofessional services associated with specialized types of geotechnical engineering (as well as geophysics; see below), as is forensic geotechnical engineering, a geoprofessional service applied to determine why a certain applicable type of event – usually a failure of some sort – occurred. (Virtually all geoprofessional services can be performed for forensic purposes, commonly as litigation-support/expert witness services.) Railway-systems engineering is another type of specialized geotechnical engineering, as are the design of piers and bulkheads, drydocks, on-shore and off-shore wind-turbine systems, and systems that stabilize oil platforms and other marine structures to the sea floor.

Geotechnical engineers have long been involved in sustainability initiatives, including (among many others) the use of excavated materials; the safe application of contaminated subsurface materials; the recycling of asphalt, concrete, and building rubble and debris; and the design of permeable pavements.

All civil-engineering specialties and projects – roads and highways, bridges, rail systems, ports and other waterfront structures, airport terminals, etc. – require the involvement of geotechnical engineers and engineering, meaning that many civil-engineering pursuits are geoprofessional pursuits to a greater or lesser degree. However, geotechnical engineering has for centuries also been associated with military engineering; sappers (in general) and miners (whose tunneling design services (known as landmining and undermining) were used in military-siege operations).

== Engineering geology and other geology specialties ==
Engineering geologist.

(a) Elements of the engineering geologist specialty.

The practice of engineering geology involves the interpretation, evaluation, analysis, and application of geological information and data to civil works. Geotechnical soil and rock units are designated, characterized, and classified, using standard engineering soil and rock classification systems. Relationships are interpreted between landform development, current and past geologic processes, ground and surface water, and the strength characteristics of soil and rock. Processes evaluated include both surficial processes (for example, slope, fluvial, and coastal processes), and deep-seated processes (for example, volcanic activity and seismicity).

Geotechnical zones or domains are designated based on soil and rocked geological strength characteristics, common landforms, related geologic processes, or other pertinent factors. Proposed developmental modifications are evaluated and, where appropriate, analyzed to predict potential or likely changes in types and rates of surficial geologic processes. Proposed modifications may include such things as vegetation removal, using various types of earth materials in construction, applying loads to shallow or deep foundations, constructing cut or fill slopes and other grading, and modifying ground and surface water flow. The effects of surficial and deep-seated geologic processes are evaluated and analyzed to predict their potential effect on public health, public safety, land use, or proposed development.

(b) Typical engineering geologic applications and types of projects. Engineering geology is applied during all project phases, from conception through planning, design, construction, maintenance, and, in some cases, reclamation and closure. Planning-level engineering geologic work is commonly conducted in response to forest practice regulations, critical areas ordinances, and the State Environmental Policy Act. Typical planning-level engineering geologic applications include timber harvest planning, proposed location of residential and commercial developments and other buildings and facilities, and alternative route selection for roads, rail lines, trails, and utilities. Site-specific engineering geologic applications include cuts, fills, and tunnels for roads, trails, railroads, and utility lines; foundations for bridges and other drainage structures, retaining walls and shoring, dams, buildings, water towers, slope, channel and shoreline stabilization facilities, fish ladders and hatcheries, ski lifts and other structures; landings for logging and other work platforms; airport landing strips; rock bolt systems; blasting; and other major earthwork projects such as for aggregate sources and landfills.

(Taken from Washington Administrative Code WAC 308-15-053(1))

While engineering geology is applicable principally to planning, design and construction activities, other specialties of geology are applied in a variety of geoprofessional specialty fields, such as mining geology, petroleum geology, and environmental geology. Note that mining geology and mining engineering are different geoprofessional fields.

== Geological engineering ==
Geological engineering is a hybrid discipline that comprises elements of civil engineering, mining engineering, petroleum engineering, and earth sciences. Geological engineers often become licensed as both engineers and geologists. There are thirteen geological-engineering (or geoengineering) programs in the United States that are accredited by the Engineering Accreditation Commission (EAC) of ABET: (1) Colorado School of Mines, (2) Michigan Technological University, (3) Missouri University of Science and Technology, (4) Montana Tech of the University of Montana, (5) South Dakota School of Mines and Technology, (6) University of Alaska-Fairbanks, (7) University of Minnesota Twin Cities, (8) University of Mississippi, (9) University of Nevada, Reno (10) University of North Dakota, (11) University of Texas at Austin, (12) University of Utah, and (13) University of Wisconsin-Madison.

Other schools offer programs or classes in geological engineering, including the University of Arizona.

Geoengineering or geological engineering, engineering geology, and geotechnical engineering deal with the discovery, development, and production and use of subsurface earth resources, as well as the design and construction of earthworks. Geoengineering is the application of geosciences, where mechanics, mathematics, physics, chemistry, and geology are used to understand and shape our interaction with the earth.

Geoengineers work in areas of

1. mining, including surface and subsurface excavations, and rock burst mitigation
2. energy, including hydraulic fracturing and drilling for exploration and production of water, oil, or gas
3. infrastructure, including underground transportation systems and isolation of nuclear and hazardous wastes; and
4. environment, including groundwater flow, contaminant transport and remediation, and hydraulic structures.

Professional geoscience organizations such as the American Rock Mechanics Association or the Geo-Institute and academic degrees such as the bachelor of geoengineering accredited by ABET acknowledge the broad scope of work practiced by geoengineers and stress fundamentals of science and engineering methods for the solution of complex problems. Geoengineers study the mechanics of rock, soil, and fluids to improve the sustainable use of earth's finite resources, where problems appear with competing interests, for example, groundwater and waste isolation, offshore oil drilling and risk of spills, natural gas production and induced seismicity.

== Geophysics ==
Geophysics is the study of the physical properties of the earth using quantitative physical methods to determine what lies beneath the earth's surface. The physical properties of concern include the propagation of elastic waves (seismic), magnetism, gravity, electrical resistivity/conductivity, and electromagnetism. Geophysics has historically been most commonly used in oil exploration and mining, but its popularity in non-destructive investigative work has flourished since the early 1990s.

It is also used in groundwater exploration and protection, geo-hazard studies (e.g., faults and landslides), alignment studies (e.g., proposed roadway, underground utilities, and pipelines), foundation studies, contamination characterization and remediation, landfill investigations, unexploded-ordnance investigations, vibration monitoring, dam-safety evaluation, location of underground storage tanks, identification of subsurface voids, and assisting in archeological investigations. (definition from Association of Environmental & Engineering Geologists)

== Geophysical engineering ==
Geophysical engineering is the application of geophysics to the engineering design of facilities including roads, tunnels, wells and mines.

== Environmental-science and environmental-engineering specialties ==
Environmental science and environmental engineering are the geoprofessions commonly associated with the identification, remediation, and prevention of environmental contamination. These services range from phase-one and phase-two environmental site-assessments – research designed to assess the likelihood that a property is contaminated and subsurface exploration conducted to identify the nature and extent of contamination, respectively – up through the design of processes and systems to remediate contaminated sites for the protection of human health and the environment.

Environmental geology is one of the principal geoprofessions engaged in assessing and remediating contaminated sites. Environmental geologists help identify the subsurface stratigraphy in which contaminants are located and through which they migrate. Environmental chemistry is the geoprofession that encompasses the study of chemical compounds in the soil. These compounds are categorized as pollutants or contaminants when introduced into the environment by human factors (e.g., waste, mining processes, radioactive release) and are not of natural origin. Environmental chemistry assesses interactions or these compounds with soil, rock, and water to determine their fate and transport, the techniques to measure the levels of contaminants in the environment, and technologies to destroy or reduce the toxicity of contaminants in wastes or compounds that have been released to the environment. Environmental engineering is often applied to assess contaminated sites, but more often is used in the design of systems to remediate contaminated soil and groundwater.

Hydrogeology is the geoprofession involved when environmental studies involve subsurface water. Hydrogeology applications range from securing safe, plentiful underground drinking-water sources to identifying the nature of groundwater contamination in order to facilitate remediation. Environmental toxicology is a geoprofession when used to identify the source, fate, transformation, effects, and risks of pollutants on the environment, including soil, water, and air. Wetlands science is a geoprofessional pursuit that incorporates several scientific disciplines, such as botany, biology, and limnology. It involves, among other activities, the delineation, conservation, restoration, and preservation of wetlands. These services are sometimes conducted by geoprofessional specialists called wetlands scientists. Ecology is a closely related environmental geoprofession involving studies into the distribution of organisms and biodiversity within an environmental context.

Numerous geoprofessional disciplines contribute to the redevelopment of brownfields, sites (typically urban) that are underused or abandoned because they are or are assumed to be contaminated by hazardous materials. Geoprofessionals are engaged to evaluate the degree to which such sites are contaminated and the steps that can be taken to achieve the sites' safe reuse. Environmental engineers and scientists work with developers to identify and design remediation strategies and exposure-barrier designs that protect future site users from unacceptable exposure to environmental contamination resulting from previous uses of the site. Because these previous uses often resulted in degraded soil conditions and the presence of abandoned, underground structures, geotechnical engineers often are needed to design special foundations for the new structures.

== Construction-materials engineering and testing (CoMET) ==
Construction-materials engineering and testing (CoMET) comprises an array of licensed-engineer-directed professional services applied principally for purposes of construction quality assurance and quality control. CoMET services commonly are provided as a separate discipline by firms that also practice geotechnical engineering, possibly among other geoprofessional disciplines. The geoprofessional-service industry has evolved in this manner because geotechnical engineering employs the observational method. Karl von Terzaghi and Ralph B. Peck – the creators of modern geotechnical engineering – used the observational method and multiple working hypotheses to expedite and economize the subsurface-exploration process, by using sampling and testing to form a judgment about subsurface conditions, and then observing excavated conditions and materials to confirm or modify those judgments and related recommendations, and then finalize them.

To economize still further, geoprofessionals educated and trained paraprofessionals to represent them on site (hence the term "field representative"), especially to apply their judgment (much as a geotechnical engineer would) in comparing observed conditions with those the geotechnical engineer believed would exist. Over time, geotechnical engineers expanded their CoMET services by providing the additional education and training their field representatives needed to evaluate constructors' attainment of conditions commonly specified by geoprofessionals; e.g., subsurface preparation for foundations of buildings, roadways, and other structures; materials used for subgrade, subbase, and base purposes; site grading; construction of earthen structures (earth dams, levees, reservoirs, landfills, et al.) and earth-retaining structures (e.g., retaining walls); and so on.

Because many of the materials involved, such as concrete, are used in other elements of construction projects and structures, geoprofessional firms expanded their field representatives' skill sets still more, to encompass observation and testing of numerous additional materials (e.g., reinforced concrete, structural steel, masonry, wood, and fireproofing), processes (e.g., cutting and filling and rebar placement), and outcomes (e.g., the effectiveness of welds). Laboratory services are a common element of many CoMET operations. Also operating under the direction of a licensed engineer, they are applied in geotechnical engineering to evaluate subsurface-material samples. In overall CoMET operations, laboratories operate with the equipment and personnel required to evaluate a variety of construction materials.

CoMET services applied to evaluate the actual composition of a site's subsurface are part of a complete geotechnical engineering service. For purposes of short-term economy, however, some owners select a firm not associated with the geotechnical engineer of record to provide these and all other CoMET services. This approach precludes the geotechnical engineer of record from providing a complete service. It also aggravates risk, because the individuals engaged to evaluate actual subsurface conditions are not "briefed" by the geotechnical engineer of record before they go to the project site and seldom communicate with the geotechnical engineer of record when they discern differences, in large part because the firm associated with the geotechnical engineer of record is regarded as a competitor of the firm employing the field representatives. In some cases, the field representatives in question lack the specific project background information and/or the education and training required to discern those differences.

CoMET services applied to evaluate constructor's attainment of specified conditions take the form of quality-assurance (QA) or quality-control (QC) services. QA services are performed directly or indirectly for the owner. The owner specifies the nature and extent of QA services that the owner believes is appropriate. Some owners specify none at all or only those that may be required by law. Those required by law are imposed via a jurisdiction's building code. Almost all U.S. jurisdictions base their building codes on "model codes" developed by associations of building officials. The International Code Council (ICC) is the most prominent of these groups and its International Building Code (IBC) is the most commonly used model. As a result, many jurisdictions now require IBC "Special Inspection," a term defined by the IBC as "the required examination of the materials, installation, fabrication, erection, or placement of components and connections requiring special expertise to ensure compliance with approved construction documents and referenced standards." Special Inspection requirements vary from jurisdiction to jurisdiction based on the provisions adopted by the local building official. While some of the services involved may be similar to or the same as conventional CoMET services, Special Inspection is handled differently. Most commonly, the owner or the owner's agent is required to retain a building-official-approved Special Inspection-services provider. Special Inspection is often required to obtain a certificate of occupancy.

QC services are those applied by or on behalf of a constructor to ensure the constructor has attained conditions the constructor has contractually agreed to attain. Most CoMET consultants are engaged far more to provide QA services than QC services.

Many CoMET procedures are specified in standards developed by standards-developing organizations (SDOs) such as the American Society of Civil Engineers (ASCE), ASTM International, and American Concrete Institute (ACI), using standards-development protocols approved by the American National Standards Institute (ANSI) and/or the International Organization for Standardization (ISO). All such standards identify what is minimally required to conform. Likewise, several organizations have developed programs to accredit CoMET field and laboratory services to perform certain types of testing and inspection. Some of these programs are more comprehensive than others; e.g., requiring regular calibration of equipment, participation in proficiency testing programs, and implementation and documentation of a (quality) management system to demonstrate technical competence. As with all such programs, of course, accreditation identifies what is least acceptable. Many CoMET laboratories go far beyond minimum requirements in an effort to attain higher levels of quality.

A variety of organizations – including local building departments – have developed personnel-certification protocols and requirements. In many jurisdictions, only appropriately certified individuals are permitted to perform certain evaluations. Individuals typically are required to meet certain prerequisites for certification and must pass examinations, in some cases involving performance observation in the field. The prerequisite for higher degrees of certification often include a requirement that the individual has met requirements for a lower degree of certification (e.g., Soils Technician I is in some cases a prerequisite for Soils Technician II). Field representatives are sometimes referred to as "soil testers," "technicians," "technicians/technologists," or "engineering technicians." The Geoprofessional Business Association developed the term "field representative" to encompass all the many types of paraprofessionals involved (e.g., those involved with specific types of materials, such as reinforced concrete, soil, or steel; those who observe or inspect processes or conditions, such as welding inspectors, caisson inspectors, and foundation inspectors), and especially to underscore their significant, mutual responsibility, that purpose titles such as "technician" fail to signify. In fact, the engineers who direct CoMET operations are personally and professionally responsible and liable for their field representatives' acts and statements while representing the engineer on site.

Especially because CoMET consultants have more hands-on experience with construction activities than many other design-team members, many owners involve them (among other geoprofessionals) from the outset of a project, during the design phase, to help the owner and/or design team members develop technical specifications and establish testing and inspection requirements, instrumentation requirements and procedures, and observation programs. Geotechnical engineers employ CoMET services during the earliest stages of a project, to oversee subsurface sampling procedures, such as drilling.

Many of the CoMET services performed for construction projects are performed for environmental projects as well, but requirements tend to be less rigid because they involve fewer licensing and related requirements. For example, individuals may perform federally mandated all-appropriate inquiries – typically a phase-one environmental site assessment – without a license of any kind.

== Other geoprofessional services ==
To the extent that archeology and paleontology require systematic subsurface excavation to recover artifacts, they, too, are considered geoprofessions. Many geoprofessional-services firms offer these services to those of their clients that need to satisfy federal and/or state regulations that require paleontological and/or archeological inquiry before site development or redevelopment activities can proceed.

== See also ==
- List of geology journals
- List of mining journals
