= Tellus A =

- Discipline: Atmospheric sciences, Oceanography
- Language: English
- Edited by: A. Hannachi

Publication details
- History: 1949-present
- Publisher: Co-action Publishing on behalf of the International Meteorological Institute
- Frequency: Bimonthly
- Open access: Yes
- License: Creative Commons license
- Impact factor: 1.700 (2023)

Standard abbreviations
- ISO 4: Tellus A

Indexing
- CODEN: TSAOD8
- ISSN: 0280-6495 (print); 1600-0870 (web)
- LCCN: 88647609
- OCLC no.: 321236831

Links
- Journal homepage

Tellus Series A: Dynamic Meteorology and Oceanography is a peer-reviewed scientific journal that is published by Co-action Publishing on behalf of the International Meteorological Institute in Stockholm, Sweden. Since January 2012, the journal is published open access. Until that time, it had been published as a subscription journal by Blackwell Munksgaard. The journal publishes original articles, short contributions and correspondence encompassing dynamic meteorology, climatology and oceanography, including numerical modelling, synoptic meteorology, weather forecasting, and climate analysis.

Tellus A is the companion to Tellus Series B: Chemical and Physical Meteorology.

In 2025, Tellus A and its companion journal Tellus B were merged to re-establish a unified journal, Tellus.

== See also ==
- List of scientific journals
- List of scientific journals in earth and atmospheric sciences
