= Sociedad Geológica del Perú =

Professional association of Peruvian geologists

Sociedad Geológica del Perú (Geological Society of Peru) is a professional association of Peruvian geologists. The association was established in 1924. The society posits its mission as: "Spreading knownledge of Earth Science, aiding scientific research while promoting cultural exchange". Sociedad Geológica del Perú has been active in cases concerning geological risk assessment, as such it denounced in 2015 the development plans for a hotel at the cliffs of the Costa Verde amid the tsunami hazard zone.

== Boletín de la Sociedad Geológica del Perú ==
Boletín de la Sociedad Geológica del Perú
- Discipline: Geology
- Language: Spanish
- Edited by: José Macharé Ordoñez

Publication details
- History: 1925–present
- Publisher: Sociedad Geológica del Perú (Peru)
- Frequency: Irregular

Standard abbreviations
- ISO 4: Bol. Soc. Geol. Perú

Indexing
- CODEN: BOGPAG
- ISSN: 0079-1091
- LCCN: gs26000431
- OCLC no.: 803347819

Links
- Journal homepage

Boletín de la Sociedad Geológica del Perú is a peer-reviewed scientific journal published on an irregular basis by the Sociedad Geológica del Perú. The journal was established in 1925 and articles are published in Spanish. The editor-in-chief is José Macharé Ordoñez (Instituto Científico del Agua).
