= Russian Journal of Earth Sciences =

- Discipline: Geology, Earth sciences
- Language: English
- Edited by: Alexey Gvishiani

Publication details
- History: 1998–present
- Publisher: Geophysical Center of the Russian Academy of Sciences (Russia)

Standard abbreviations
- ISO 4: Russ. J. Earth Sci.

Indexing
- ISSN: 1681-1208
- OCLC no.: 45154966

Links
- Journal homepage

The Russian Journal of Earth Sciences is a peer-reviewed scientific journal published by the Geophysical Center of the Russian Academy of Sciences. The journal published works of Russian scientists in English. The journal was established in 1998 and the editor-in-chief is Alexey Gvishiani.

== See also ==
- Fennia
- GFF
