= Journal of African Earth Sciences =

- Discipline: Geology, Earth sciences
- Language: English
- Edited by: M. Abdel Salam, Damien Delvux, R.B.M. Mapeo

Publication details
- History: 1983–present
- Publisher: Elsevier
- Impact factor: 2.3 (2022)

Standard abbreviations
- ISO 4: J. Afr. Earth Sci.

Indexing
- ISSN: 1464-343X

Links
- Journal homepage; Online access

The Journal of African Earth Sciences is a peer-reviewed scientific journal published by Elsevier established in 1983. It covers the earth sciences, primarily on issues that are relevant to Africa and the Middle East.

== Editorial board ==
The editors-in-chief are Mohamed Abdelsalam (Oklahoma State University), Damien Delvaux (Royal Museum for Central Africa) et Read Mapeo (University of Botswana).

== See also ==
- GeoArabia
- South African Journal of Geology
