= Austrian Journal of Earth Sciences =

- Discipline: Geology
- Language: English
- Edited by: Michael Wagreich

Publication details
- Former name: Mitteilungen der Geologischen Gesellschaft in Wien
- History: 1908–present
- Publisher: Sciendo / De Gruyter Poland (Poland)
- Open access: Yes
- Impact factor: 0.432 (2018)

Standard abbreviations
- ISO 4: Austrian J. Earth Sci.

Indexing
- ISSN: 2072-7151 (print); 2300-1887 (web)

Links
- Journal homepage

Austrian Journal of Earth Sciences is a peer-reviewed open access scholarly journal publishing original scientific contributions covering a wide spectrum of earth science topics, mainly focusing on Alpine geology and the geology of Central Europe and Alpine orogens. It the official journal of the Austrian Geological Society (Österreichische Geologische Gesellschaft). The current editor-in-chief is Michael Wagreich.

== Abstracting and indexing ==
The journal is abstracted and indexed in:

- Astrophysics Data System
- CNKI
- EBSCO
- Essential Science Indicators
- GEOBASE
- GeoRef
- Science Citation Index Expanded
- Scopus
- Zoological Record
