= Society of Exploration Geophysicists =

Nonprofit geoscience organization

- Formation: 1930; 96 years ago
- Type: learned society
- Headquarters: Houston, Texas
- Region served: Worldwide
- Methods: Conferences, Publications, Training
- Chairman: Rocky Detoma
- Website: seg.org

The Society of Exploration Geophysicists (SEG) is a learned society dedicated to promoting the science and education of exploration geophysics in particular and geophysics in general. The Society fosters the expert and ethical practice of geophysics in the exploration and development of natural resources, in characterizing the near-surface, and in mitigating earth hazards. As of November 2019, SEG has more than 14,000 members working in more than 114 countries. SEG was founded in 1930 in Houston, Texas but its business office has been headquartered in Tulsa, Oklahoma since the mid-1940s. While most SEG members are involved in exploration for petroleum, SEG members also are involved in application of geophysics methods to mineral exploration as well as environmental and engineering problems, archaeology, and other scientific endeavors. SEG publishes The Leading Edge (TLE), a monthly professional magazine, Geophysics, a peer-reviewed archival publication, and Interpretation, a peer-reviewed journal co-published by SEG and the American Association of Petroleum Geologists.

SEG's Technical Standards Committee develops and maintains specifications for geophysical data. Most familiar of these standards are the SEG Y data format for storing seismic data.

== History ==
SEG was founded in 1930 by 30 men and women who felt that the use of geophysical technology for petroleum exploration had matured to the point that a professional society was needed in order to facilitate the transfer of technical knowledge.

The Society started its own journal, Geophysics, in 1936. Membership grew significantly in the late 1930s and early 1940s and this required hiring a permanent staff to conduct the Society's day-to-day operations. As a result, a business office was opened in Tulsa. Further growth necessitated commissioning permanent office space for the staff. One was opened in the 1960s and another, the Cecil and Ida Green Tower, in the 1980s.

SEG has always held an annual meeting but it was in conjunction with the AAPG convention until 1955. SEG began sponsoring an independent annual meeting in that year and it quickly became the world's premier showcase for state-of-the-art geophysical instrumentation.

== Membership ==
SEG memberships include several types to fit different needs. Members get full access to the SEG Digital Library, which includes Geophysics, The Leading Edge, SEG Technical Program Expanded Abstracts, and Robert E. Sheriff's Encyclopedic Dictionary of Applied Geophysics, fourth edition. All members also receive the SEG Yearbook on a CD that also includes the previous year's articles from Geophysics and TLE. Most members receive TLE in print, and Geophysics in print is available to members at a modest subscription rate.

In addition, members get lower pricing for reference publications at the SEG Book Mart, Annual Meeting registration, and professional development. SEG Online offers members a suite of services including an online messaging and collaboration tool, a career center, and group health and life insurance in cooperation with its partner society American Association of Petroleum Geologists (AAPG).

== Meetings and events ==
SEG has hosted meetings, conferences, workshops, forums, and expositions for the geosciences community for more than 78 years. These international events have taken place in numerous locations on six continents. In addition to serving its global membership, SEG works with other organizations, associated societies, and businesses around the world to create the most comprehensive listing of meetings as possible. These SEG international events bring together a global society in ventures of education, research, collaboration, and networking.

SEG's Annual Meeting and International Exposition, held in cities including Houston, New Orleans, Las Vegas, and San Antonio, is the world's largest gathering of exploration geophysics-related activities. Six days of Annual Meeting events deliver to geoscience professionals technical paper presentations, poster presentations, an exposition showcasing the latest in geoscience-related products and services, workshops, continuing education courses, tours, networking events, career services, and student events. It regularly brings together more than 8,000 exploration industry professionals from around the globe.

== Students ==
In June 2013, SEG's student membership totaled more than 12,000, with 297 active student chapters in 63 countries.

== SEG Foundation ==
In 1958, the Society of Exploration Geophysicists (SEG) formed a trust to provide scholarships for students of geophysics. Thirty years later, in response to the needs of a growing industry, that trust was transformed into the SEG Foundation.

Beginning in 1961, the Society has annually awarded its Reginald Fessenden Award to "a person who has made a specific technical contribution to exploration geophysics".

In 2008, the SEG Foundation launched a program called Geoscientists Without Borders. The program helps geoscience students and experienced geoscientists apply their knowledge and technical skills towards the mitigation of natural disasters in some of the world's neediest communities.

Other programs include the Distinguished Instructor Short Course (DISC), the Honorary Lecturer program, SEG Forums, and the newly launched SEG Online.

Since 1956, four thousand scholarships representing almost $5 million have been awarded to 1,900 individuals in the past 50 years. In addition to its ground breaking scholarship program, the SEG Foundation and its donors also fund student travel grants, leadership training, and field camps.

== Journals, books, and newsletters ==
SEG's publications program helps the society fulfill its mission of promoting the science of geophysics and the professional development of geoscientists by disseminating information about geophysical research and applications through a variety of channels. The reference publications program publishes a wide range of books, DVDs, CDs, videos, and slide sets in several series. These can be purchased online through the SEG Book Mart.

=== Journals ===
SEG publishes three journals. Geophysics, published by SEG since 1936, is an archival journal encompassing all aspects of research, exploration, and education in applied geophysics. The Leading Edge (TLE) is a gateway publication introducing new geophysical theory, instrumentation, and established practices to scientists in a wide range of geoscience disciplines. Most material is presented in a semitechnical manner that minimizes mathematical theory and emphasizes practical applications. SEG's newest publication, Interpretation, launched in August 2013, is a peer-reviewed journal co-published by SEG and AAPG for advancing the practice of subsurface interpretation.

=== SEG Digital Library ===
The Digital Library is SEG's online resource for the SEG research collection. SEG's online offerings include electronic versions of Geophysics and TLE; the Encyclopedic Dictionary of Applied Geophysics, fourth edition; SEG Technical Program Expanded Abstracts; the multisociety Digital Cumulative Index; SEG Technical Standards; SEG news; the SEG Extra e-mail newsletter; and the SEG Yearbook. The Digital Library also offers research collections from the Environmental and Engineering Geophysical Society (EEGS) and the Australian Society of Exploration Geophysicists (ASEG) societies.

== Professional Development ==
SEG Professional Development consists of four programs:

- SEG Distinguished Instructor Short Course
- Continuing Education short courses
- Distinguished Lecturer
- Honorary Lecturer

=== Distinguished Instructor Short Course (DISC) ===
The SEG Distinguished Instructor Short Course (DISC) is SEG's primary professional development program. The DISC is a one-day course taught by a prominent geophysicist on a current topic of interest to a broad audience of geoscientists. The DISC visits over 25 sites around the world each year.

=== Continuing Education ===
The backbone of the SEG Professional Development program is Continuing Education (CE). These short courses, taught by industry experts, cover topics from the fundamental to the leading edge of geophysics. CE courses are held in one of three ways: public courses, section-sponsored courses, and contract (in-house) courses. Public courses are sponsored directly by SEG, a series of courses called an [Education Week] is offered four times per year, once in west Houston, once in New Orleans, once in Calgary, and once in north Houston. Public courses are also offered each year the weekend prior to the SEG Annual Meeting.

Section-sponsored courses are sponsored by SEG sections or affiliated societies, and contract courses are sponsored by individual companies or organizations. Generally one or two days long, most courses can be expanded up to 5 days if desired.

=== Distinguished Lecturer ===
The Distinguished Lecturer (DL) program is offered two times per year. The Spring DL visits a minimum of 15 locations each year to present a lecture suitable for a lunch or dinner meeting of a local section or university group. Each year the DL is recorded and posted to the Distinguished Lecturers Presentation Library for free viewing by members and the public.

The Fall DL is sponsored jointly with the American Association of Petroleum Geologists (AAPG). SEG and AAPG alternate years administering the program.

=== Honorary Lecturer ===
SEG also offers the Honorary Lecturer (HL) program. The HL program is a companion program to the DL with a focus to transfer knowledge within a region. The regional focus strengthens services SEG provides to an expanding global membership. Lectures may be given in English or a language appropriate to the region.

The regions are Central and South America, Europe, Middle East and Africa, North America, the Pacific South, and South and East Asia.

== SEG Wiki ==
The SEG Wiki launched in the winter of 2011, seeded with SEG's number one bestseller, Robert E. Sheriff's Encyclopedic Dictionary of Applied Geophysics. All entries in the SEG Wiki can be modified and improved by SEG members. All content in the wiki is published under the Creative Commons Attribution-ShareAlike 3.0 Unported License (CC-BY-SA), the same as Wikipedia.

Additional highlights in the SEG Wiki include:

- Biographies: Many of the pioneers in the development of exploration geophysics, including past SEG presidents, editors of Geophysics, and SEG Honors and Awards' winners.
- Open data: This section documents geophysical data that is readily available for download from the internet, via mail, or through special request.
- In early October 2014, SEG's second bestselling book, Seismic Data Analysis, by Öz Yilmaz was added to the wiki.
- The geophysical tutorial series debuted in the February 2014 issue of The Leading Edge. The tutorials appear every other month to serve as a brief exploration of a geophysical topic.

== See also ==
- Maurice Ewing Medal
- List of geoscience organizations
- American Association of Petroleum Geologists (AAPG)
- American Geophysical Union (AGU)
- Society of Petroleum Engineers (SPE)
- European Association of Geoscientists & Engineers (EAGE)
