= Geophysics (journal) =

- Discipline: Geophysics
- Language: English
- Edited by: Jeffrey Shragge

Publication details
- History: 1936–present
- Publisher: Society of Exploration Geophysicists
- Frequency: Bimonthly
- Impact factor: 3.0 (2023)

Standard abbreviations
- ISO 4: Geophysics

Indexing
- CODEN: GPYSA7
- ISSN: 0016-8033 (print); 1942-2156 (web)
- OCLC no.: 1570724

Links
- Journal homepage; Online access; Online archive

Geophysics is a bimonthly peer-reviewed scientific journal covering all aspects of research, exploration, and education in applied geophysics. It was established in 1936 and is published by the Society of Exploration Geophysicists. The current editor-in-chief is Jeffrey Shragge (Colorado School of Mines). According to the Journal Citation Reports, the journal has a 2018 impact factor of 2.793.

== See also ==
- List of scientific journals in earth and atmospheric sciences
