= Revista Mexicana de Ciencias Geológicas =

- Discipline: Geology, Earth sciences
- Language: English, Spanish
- Edited by: Angel F. Nieto Samaniego, Peter Schaaf

Publication details
- History: 1976–present
- Publisher: National Autonomous University of Mexico, Sociedad Geológica Mexicana, Instituto Nacional de Geoquímica, Sociedad Mexicana de Paleontología (Mexico)
- Frequency: Triannually
- Open access: Yes
- Impact factor: 0.815 (2016)

Standard abbreviations
- ISO 4: Rev. Mex. Cienc. Geol.

Indexing
- CODEN: RMCGCV
- ISSN: 1026-8774 (print); 2007-2902 (web)
- OCLC no.: 819039220

Links
- Journal homepage; Online access; Online archive

The Revista Mexicana de Ciencias Geológicas is a triannual peer-reviewed open-access scientific journal published by the National Autonomous University of Mexico, Sociedad Geológica Mexicana, Instituto Nacional de Geoquímica, and Sociedad Mexicana de Paleontología. It covers the field of geology and related Earth sciences, primarily on issues that are relevant to Latin America and Mexico. It was established in 1976 and the editors-in-chief are Angel F. Nieto Samaniego and Peter Schaaf (National Autonomous University of Mexico).

== Abstracting and indexing ==
The journal is abstracted and indexed in:

- Chemical Abstracts Service
- Current Contents/Physical, Chemical & Earth Sciences
- GeoRef
- Latindex
- Redalyc
- SCIELO
- Science Citation Index Expanded
- Scopus
- The Zoological Record

According to the Journal Citation Reports, the journal has a 2016 impact factor of 0.815.
