= Hellenic Journal of Geosciences =

Hellenic Journal of Geosciences (formerly Annales Géologiques des Pays Hélléniques) publishes original contributions on all aspects of earth sciences. The Hellenic Journal of Geosciences (ISSN 1105-0004) is published by the University of Athens, Faculty of Geology and Geoenvironment performs the distribution of the journal, which is distributed in 200 libraries and Institutes in Europe, 103 in Greece and 66 in the rest of the world.
