= Journal of Earthquake and Tsunami =

- Discipline: Engineering
- Language: English
- Edited by: Zhenhua Huang, Naser Khaji

Publication details
- History: 2007-present
- Publisher: World Scientific (Singapore)
- Frequency: Bi-monthly
- Impact factor: 2.7 (2025)

Standard abbreviations
- ISO 4: J. Earthq. Tsunami

Indexing
- ISSN: 1793-4311 (print); 1793-7116 (web)

Links
- Journal homepage

The Journal of Earthquake and Tsunami was founded in 2007 and is published by World Scientific. The journal publishes articles and papers relating to earthquakes and tsunamis, in particular: geological and seismological setting, ground motion, site and building response, tsunami generation, propagation, damage and mitigation, as well as education and risk management. It is a hybrid journal which lets the authors choose to publish their articles as Open Access by paying an Article Processing Charge (APC).
