= Mexican Geological Society =

Mexican learned society

- Abbreviation: SGM
- Formation: 1904; 121 years ago
- Type: Scientific society
- Headquarters: Ciudad de México, México
- Website: www.sociedadgeologicamexicana.org.mx

The Mexican Geological Society (in Spanish: Sociedad Geológica Mexicana) is a Mexican learned society founded in 1904. Among the founders was geologist Dr. José G. Aguilera who also was the first president of the society. The society publishes the journal Boletín de la Sociedad Geológica Mexicana.
