= Atmospheric Research =

- Discipline: Atmospheric sciences
- Language: English
- Edited by: Zhiyuan Cong and Olivier Dessens

Publication details
- History: 1986–present
- Publisher: Elsevier (Netherlands)
- Open access: No
- Impact factor: 4.5 (2023)

Standard abbreviations
- ISO 4: Atmos. Res.

Indexing
- ISSN: 0169-8095
- OCLC no.: 38524896

Links
- Journal homepage

Atmospheric Research is a scientific journal dealing with the part of the atmosphere where meteorological events occur; intended for atmospheric scientists (such as meteorologists and climatologists), aerosol scientists, and hydrologists. It is a highly international journal with attention given to all processes extending from the earth surface to the tropopause, but special emphasis continues to be devoted to the physics of clouds and precipitation, i.e. atmospheric aerosols; microphysical processes; cloud dynamics and thermodynamics; numerical simulation of cloud processes; clouds and radiation; meso- and macrostructure of clouds and cloud systems, and weather modification.

== See also ==
- Atmospheric science
- List of scientific journals
  - List of scientific journals in earth and atmospheric sciences
