= Tellus (app) =

Financial services and real-estate management firm

Tellus App, Inc.
- Type: Private
- Industry: Real estate and Fintech
- Founded: 2016; 10 years ago
- Founder: Rocky Lee; Tiancheng Zhu
- Headquarters: Cupertino, California, United States of America
- Website: https://www.tellusapp.com

Tellus App, Inc. (d.b.a. Tellus, previously known as Zilly, Inc.) is an American real estate technology and financial technology company. The company's primary product, an eponymous app, provides a property management and payment system for use in housing rentals, and offers non-FDIC-insured cash accounts targeted at general consumers.

Tellus was founded in 2016 by cofounders Rocky Lee and Tiancheng Zhu, who previously had worked as a corporate lawyer and a businessman respectively. Prior to the firm's creation, Lee had business connections in both China and the United States, while Zhu had mostly worked in Silicon Valley.

The company's business model has drawn scrutiny from the United States Senate Committee on Banking, Housing, and Urban Affairs, whose chair, Sherrod Brown, wrote letters to Tellus and to the FDIC that requested information from Tellus on its operations, expressed concerns about the business's customer deposit and mortgage lending operations, and called for the FDIC to investigate Tellus's business practices. In 2023, the FDIC demanded that Tellus change its marketing practices, which have been described as misleading.

== Early corporate history ==
Tellus was founded in 2016 by cofounders Rocky Lee and Tiancheng Zhu, who previously had worked as a corporate lawyer and a businessman respectively. Prior to the firm's creation, Lee had business connections in both China and the United States, while Zhu had mostly worked in Silicon Valley. The company's first line of business was as a property management mobile application that provided a way for landlords to manage rent payments and expenses, as well as conduct secure messaging with tenants. The app also allows for property managers to screen rent applicants and comes with in-app customer support. In 2020, the company added Jim Yu, who had earned a Master of Business Administration from the Stanford Graduate School of Business.

In 2021, CyberNews reported that it had discovered an Amazon S3 bucket belonging to Tellus. It contained "user records, chat logs, and transaction records" dated between 2018 and January 2020, which had been publicly exposed. The exposed bucket held 6,729 files containing user records, chat logs, and transaction details, including personal information such as customer names, emails, user IDs, customer addresses, court dates, phone numbers, scans of tenant-submitted documents, and other sensitive images. As of May 2021, Tellus had secured the bucket, but CyberNews was unable to determine if or how many malefactors accessed the data during the exposure period.

== Expansion into consumer financial services ==
In 2019, Tellus expanded from a property management app by opening a lending business arm, branded as "Tellus 2.0". The lending arm, per a patent application and Barron's, initially used money from accredited investors to fund cash out refinances.

In 2020, the firm pivoted and released "Tellus Boost", a product where funding for mortgage lending was drawn from customer deposits held in a cash account, in exchange for which depositors would receive interest payments. Tellus's revenue on its Tellus Boost product comes from the difference between a lower interest rate paid by Tellus to depositors, and a higher interest rate paid by loan recipients to Tellus. Lee told TechCrunch in 2022 that loan recipients from Tellus frequently had sought super jumbo mortgages, and that its average loan size was $2 million. By April 2023, the company had expanded its offerings made using funds from consumer depository accounts to include real estate bridge loans. Tellus has stated that these loans made using customer deposits represent a small portion of their total business.

In Q4 2022, the company announced it had raised a seed round of approximately $16 million from a group of investors led by Andreessen Horowitz, in addition to an additional $10 million that had been raised via a simple agreement for future equity with other investors. At the time of the round, the company had been seeking to increase headcount, which had numbered around 50 employees as of November 2022.

The majority of the firm's lending takes place in the San Francisco Bay area; between April and December 2023, 68% of funds lent went to affiliates of AlphaX RE Capital for their investments in Silicon Valley properties. In the preceding two years, approximately $33 million of the firm's $100 million in loans had gone to affiliates of that firm, which is based in San Jose, California.

=== Relationship with banking and securities ===
==== Banking ====
While Tellus possesses a California state lending license, which allows it to issue loans in the state of California, Tellus does not have a banking license and customer deposits are not FDIC-insured. Tellus characterizes itself as a financial technology company, publicly states on its website that it is not a bank, and is not regulated as if it were a bank. Nevertheless, Tellus's consumer-facing accounts function by taking deposits and providing an account balance from which customers can withdraw at any time, while representing that the account balance is a debt payable to its corresponding account holder. Todd Phillips and Matthew Adam Bruckner, writing in the Stanford Law & Policy Review, refer to Tellus as an "imitation bank", characterizing it as being among "retail-facing institutions that take customer deposits while evading the banking and consumer protection laws that protect customers and the financial system". Phillips and Bruckner argue that the Consumer Financial Protection Bureau has jurisdiction over Tellus, arguing that the firm has engaged in deposit-taking as defined in the Consumer Financial Protection Act.

Tellus said in 2023 that it makes low-risk mortgages using customer funds that return high rates of interest. But several of the loans issued by Tellus have been issued to higher risk of default, including to clients whose real estate investment objectives were speculation and to clients under financial distress. And between April and December 2023, 2 mortgages issued by Tellus defaulted; Tellus alleged in court filings that the two properties owed over $6 million to Tellus.

In Tellus's marketing materials, the company has often compared and contrasted itself against banks, or otherwise touted relationships with banks. According to Barron's, several of these marketing materials have included false or misleading information regarding its financial products and its relationships with established banks. After SVB collapsed, however, Tellus publicly stated that the firm did not have any funds with SVB, and lacked exposure to it. Instead, Tellus wrote, it had banking partnerships with JPMorgan Chase and Wells Fargo. But when Barron's asked JPMorgan Chase and Wells Fargo if they had a banking partnership with Tellus, both banks told Barron's that they did not; shortly thereafter, Tellus removed reference to each of the banks from its website. Likewise, a November 2023 TikTok-based influencer marketing campaign featuring Faares Quadri advertised a Tellus savings account as being FDIC-insured and custodied by Capital One; after Barron's contacted Capital One, the bank stated that it had never had such a partnership with Tellus, and Tellus subsequently removed marketing materials claiming "FDIC coverage with Capital One" from its website.

==== Securities ====
Tellus characterizes its consumer services as packaging together cash from multiple investors to make real estate loans; per Tellus, when an in investor's cash is used in one of these loans, cash is deemed "deployed" in a particular loan; Tellus states that this is not a mortgage-backed security. Debt payable by Tellus to account holders is also not a registered security, and disclosures for this debt product that would be required of registered securities are thus not published. Instead, consumers seeking to evaluate the risk of the debt product must rely on risk descriptions published by Tellus on its own website, and also on public reporting. Ann M. Lipton, a business law professor at Tulane University, told Barron's in April 2023 that Tellus's consumer debt products appeared to be "like the kinds of things that have been deemed securities in the past". Separately, a 2021 SEC whistleblower complaint alleging that Tellus was selling an unlicensed security was filed by Barry Minkow.

=== Regulatory and senatorial scrutiny ===
Following the publication of a Barron's cover story on Tellus's business model in April 2023, Tellus received additional public scrutiny relating to its business practices, including its marketing practices, disclosure of risks to clients, and its risk management more broadly.

In May 2023, Senate Committee on Banking, Housing, and Urban Affairs chairman Sherrod Brown wrote letters to Tellus's chief technology officer and the chair of the FDIC, citing red flags that had been raised regarding Tellus's marketing and general business practices. Specifically, Brown raised concerns regarding the heavy concentration of Tellus's investments in the San Francisco Bay area in light of locally declining housing prices, Tellus's marketing materials falsely leading consumers to believe that their deposits are as safe as they would be in FDIC-insured accounts, and Tellus's having advertised relationships with large banks when no such relationships existed. Brown requested related information from Tellus and called for the FDIC to investigate Tellus's business practices in light of these red flags. Tellus, after receiving the letter, told TechCrunch that it disagreed with Brown's assessment of Tellus's business as having been misleading or excessively risky.

By July 2023, the FDIC had instructed Tellus to update its social media posts and other materials intended for consumers to provide clearer information about the nature and extent of deposit insurance coverage for the firm's products.
