= International Journal of Speleology =

- Discipline: physical speleology, biospeleology
- Language: English
- Edited by: Bogdan P. Onac

Publication details
- History: 1964-present
- Publisher: Società Speleologica Italiana (Italy)
- Frequency: Biannual
- Open access: Yes
- License: Creative Commons Attribution-NonCommercial 4.0
- Impact factor: 1.566 (2020)

Standard abbreviations
- ISO 4: Int. J. Speleol.

Indexing
- ISSN: 0392-6672 (print); 1827-806X (web)

Links
- Journal homepage; Online access

The International Journal of Speleology is since 1978 the official peer-reviewed scientific journal of the Union Internationale de Spéléologie. Since 1981 it has been published by the Società Speleologica Italiana.

The International Journal of Speleology is divided into four sections: Botany-Microbiology, Zoology, Geology-Geomorphology, and Abstract-News.

== History ==
The first issue was edited by G. Claus (US), subsequently two other editors were added: R. Husson (France) and G Nicholas (USA). The first two volumes were published by the J. Kramer Verlag (Germany), followed by Swets & Zeitlinger N.V. (The Netherlands).

In 1972 R. Husson became editor in chief and nine volumes were issued in the period 1964 to 1977 until the cost of printing requested a radical change. In 1978 the journal became the official journal of the Union Internationale de Spéléologie and it was published in Italy where the cost of printing was lower.

In 1981 V. Sbordoni (Italy) became editor in chief. In the meantime the Società Speleologica Italiana acquired the property of the journal which was printed with a contribution of the Italian Ministry for Culture and Environment, the Consiglio Nazionale delle Ricerche, and the University of Trieste.

In the second half of the 1990s the Museo di Speleologia "V. Rivera" also contributed to the financial support of the journal. The issues of the journal were alternatively dedicated to biospeleology and physical speleology until 1998 when the journal was split into two different series: "A" for Biospeleology (which ceased publication in 2003) and "B" for Physical Speleology.

In addition to the regular issues of the journal, in 1996 a "Manual for Karst water analysis" by W.E. Krawczyk was printed.

== Abstracting and indexing ==
The journal is abstracted and indexed in:

- DOAJ
- Scopus
- Science Citation Index Expanded
- Current Contents Physical, Chemical & Earth Sciences
- Essential Science Indicators
- Zoological Record

== See also ==
- List of scientific journals
- List of scientific journals in earth and atmospheric sciences
