= Journal of Geosciences =

- Discipline: Earth sciences
- Language: English
- Edited by: V. Janoušek

Publication details
- Former names: Časopis pro mineralogii a geologii (1956-1992), Journal of the Czech Geological Society (1993-2006)
- History: 1956-present
- Publisher: Czech Geological Society (Czech Republic)
- Frequency: Quarterly
- Open access: Yes
- Impact factor: 1.279 (2011)

Standard abbreviations
- ISO 4: J. Geosci.

Indexing
- ISSN: 1802-6222 (print); 1803-1943 (web)

Links
- Journal homepage; Online tables of contents

Journal of Geosciences (1956-1992 Časopis pro mineralogii a geologii, 1993-2006: Journal of the Czech Geological Society) is a peer-reviewed scientific journal published by the Czech Geological Society and its predecessors since 1956. The journal covers research in the fields of igneous and metamorphic petrology, geochemistry, and mineralogy.

== Abstracting and indexing ==
The journal is abstracted and indexed in:

- Science Citation Index Expanded
- Current Contents/Physical, Chemical & Earth Sciences
- Scopus
- GeoRef

In addition, it is part of the Geoscience e-Journals collection. According to the Journal Citation Reports, the journal has a 2011 impact factor of 1.279.
