= Geoheritage (journal) =

- Discipline: Geoheritage
- Language: English
- Edited by: Kevin Page

Publication details
- History: 2009–present
- Publisher: Springer Science+Business Media on behalf of ProGEO, the International Association for the Conservation of Geological Heritage
- Frequency: Quarterly
- Open access: Hybrid
- Impact factor: 2.6 (2025)

Standard abbreviations
- ISO 4: Geoheritage

Indexing
- ISSN: 1867-2477 (print); 1867-2485 (web)
- LCCN: 2019207170
- OCLC no.: 1368658292

Links
- Journal homepage; Online archive

Geoheritage is a quarterly peer-reviewed academic journal covering all aspects of global geoheritage, both in situ and portable. It was established in 2009 and is published by Springer Science+Business Media on behalf of ProGEO, the International Association for the Conservation of Geological Heritage.

== Editors-in-chief ==
The founding editor-in-chief was José Brilha (University of Minho) with William Wimbledon (University of Bristol) as co-editor (2009–2012), followed by William Wimbledon and Kevin Page (University of Exeter) (2013–2014), and from 2014–present Kevin Page.

== Abstract and indexing ==
This journal is abstracted and indexed in Current Contents/Physical, Chemical & Earth Sciences, GEOBASE, Scopus, and Science Citation Index Expanded. According to the Journal Citation Reports, the journal had a 2025 impact factor of 2.6.
