= Atlantic Geoscience =

- Discipline: Geology
- Language: English
- Edited by: Sandra Barr, Rob Fensome, Simon Haslett, David West

Publication details
- Former name(s): Maritime Sediments; Maritime Sediments and Atlantic Geology; Atlantic Geology
- History: 1965–present
- Publisher: Atlantic Geoscience Society (Canada)
- Impact factor: 0.856 (2012)

Standard abbreviations
- ISO 4: Atl. Geosci.

Indexing
- Atl. Geosci.
- ISSN: 2564-2987
- Atl. Geol.
- ISSN: 0843-5561 (print); 1718-7885 (web)
- LCCN: 90648412
- OCLC no.: 612156124
- Marit. Sediments Atl. Geol.
- ISSN: 0711-1150
- LCCN: 82645195
- OCLC no.: 07414443
- Marit. Sediments
- CODEN: MARSB2
- ISSN: 0025-3456
- LCCN: sf80000116
- OCLC no.: 01756699

Links
- Journal homepage; Online access; Online archive

Atlantic Geology is a peer-reviewed scientific journal covering the geology of Atlantic Canada and related areas. It is the only regional geology journal in Canada and publishes papers, notes and discussions on original research, and review papers. It was established in 1965 and since 1986 has been published by the Atlantic Geoscience Society with digital publishing assistance from the University of New Brunswick. The journal was one of the first all-digital publications in Canada.

== History ==
The journal was established in 1965 as Maritime Sediments and in 1981 renamed Maritime Sediments and Atlantic Geology, then in 1989 Atlantic Geology, before obtaining its current name in 2022. The founding editor-in-chief was Daniel Stanley (Dalhousie University).

Subsequent editors have included Deryck Laming, Bernard Pelletier, George Pajari, Ron Pickerill, G Williams, and the current editors, Sandra Barr (Acadia University), Rob Fensome (Geological Survey of Canada), Simon Haslett (Cardiff University), and David West (Middlebury College).

== Abstracting and indexing ==
The journal is abstracted and indexed by GeoRef, Scopus, Science Citation Index Expanded, Current Contents/Physical, Chemical & Earth Sciences, and The Zoological Record. According to the Journal Citation Reports, the journal has a 2012 impact factor of 0.856.
