= Nature Geoscience =

- Discipline: Geosciences
- Language: English
- Edited by: Tamara Goldin

Publication details
- History: 2008–present
- Publisher: Nature Publishing Group
- Frequency: Monthly
- Impact factor: 15.9 (2024)

Standard abbreviations
- ISO 4: Nat. Geosci.

Indexing
- CODEN: NGAEBU
- ISSN: 1752-0894 (print); 1752-0908 (web)
- LCCN: 2008203703
- OCLC no.: 187319519

Links
- Journal homepage; Online archive

Nature Geoscience is a monthly peer-reviewed scientific journal published by the Nature Publishing Group. The Chief Editor is Tamara Goldin, who took over from Heike Langenberg in February 2020. It was established in January 2008.

== Scope ==
The journal covers all aspects of the Earth sciences, including theoretical research, modelling, and field work. Significant related work in other fields, such as atmospheric sciences, geology, geophysics, climatology, oceanography, palaeontology, and space science, is also published.

== Abstracting and indexing ==
The journal is abstracted and indexed by:

- CAB Abstracts
- Chemical Abstracts Service/CASSI
- Science Citation Index
- Current Contents/Physical, Chemical & Earth Sciences
- GeoRef

According to the Journal Citation Reports, the journal has a 2024 impact factor of 15.9.

== See also ==
- List of scientific journals in earth and atmospheric sciences
