= Tellus B =

- Discipline: Atmospheric sciences, marine chemistry, geochemistry
- Language: English
- Edited by: H. C. Hansson

Publication details
- History: 1948 - present
- Publisher: Stockholm University Press on behalf of the International Meteorological Institute (Sweden)
- Frequency: Bimonthly
- Open access: Yes (from 2012)
- License: Creative Commons license
- Impact factor: 2.3 (2023)

Standard abbreviations
- ISO 4: Tellus B

Indexing
- ISSN: 0280-6509 (print); 1600-0889 (web)
- OCLC no.: 47671674

Links
- Journal homepage

Tellus Series B: Chemical and Physical Meteorology is an open access scientific journal that is published by Stockholm University Press for the International Meteorological Institute in Stockholm, Sweden since 2022. Between 2012 and 2022, the issues were published online by Co-action Publishing. The journal publishes original articles, short contributions, and correspondence on atmospheric chemistry, surface exchange processes, long-range and global transport, aerosol science, and cloud physics including related radiation transfer. Biogeochemical cycles including related aspects of marine chemistry and geochemistry also represent a central theme.

Tellus B is the companion to Tellus Series A: Dynamic Meteorology and Oceanography.

In 2025, Tellus B and its companion journal Tellus A were merged to re-establish a unified journal, Tellus.

== See also ==
- List of scientific journals
  - List of scientific journals in earth and atmospheric sciences
