= Open Geosciences =

- Discipline: Earth science
- Language: English

Publication details
- Former name: Central European Journal of Geosciences
- History: 2009-present
- Publisher: Walter de Gruyter
- Frequency: Upon acceptance
- Open access: Yes
- License: Creative Commons-BY-NC-ND
- Impact factor: 2 (2022)

Standard abbreviations
- ISO 4: Open Geosci.

Indexing
- ISSN: 2391-5447
- Open Geosciences

Links
- Journal homepage

Open Geosciences is a peer-reviewed open-access scientific journal covering all aspects of the Earth sciences. It is published by De Gruyter and the editor-in-chief is Piotr Jankowski (San Diego State University). The journal was established in 2009 as the Central European Journal of Geosciences, co-published by Versita and Springer Science+Business Media. In 2014, the journal was moved to De Gruyter. It obtained its current name in 2015, when it became open-access.

== Abstracting and indexing ==
The journals is abstracted and indexed by the following services:

- Scopus
- Solid States and Superconductivity Abstracts
- GeoRef
- Google Scholar
- SCImago Journal Rank
- WorldCat
- ReadCube
- Astrophysics Data System
- Index Copernicus
- Directory of Open Access Journals (DOAJ)
- Current Contents - Clarivate Analytics (formerly Thomson Reuters)
- Journal Citation Reports - Clarivate Analytics (formerly Thomson Reuters)
- Science Citation Index Expanded (SCI) - Clarivate Analytics (formerly Thomson Reuters)

According to Journal Citation Reports, the journal has a 2018 impact factor of 0.788.
