= International Journal of Earth Sciences =

- Discipline: Geology
- Language: English, German
- Edited by: W.-C. Dullo

Publication details
- Publisher: Springer (Germany)
- Frequency: Monthly
- Impact factor: 2.342 (2011)

Standard abbreviations
- ISO 4: Int. J. Earth Sci.

Indexing
- ISSN: 1437-3254 (print); 1437-3262 (web)

Links
- Journal homepage

International Journal of Earth Sciences is a peer-reviewed scientific journal published monthly by Springer Science+Business Media. It covers original and review papers on the history of earth and is an international Geoscience journal. Subject areas covered in the journal include: dynamics of the lithosphere, tectonics and volcanology, sedimentology, evolution of life, marine and continental ecosystems, global dynamics of physicochemical cycles, mineral deposits and hydrocarbons, and surface processes.

== History ==
The journal was founded in 1910 as Geologische Rundschau and was renamed in 1999.

== Impact factor ==
The journal has an impact factor of 2.7 (2021).

== Editor ==
The editor in chief is Ulrich Riller (Universität Hamburg, Germany).
