= Physics of the Earth and Planetary Interiors =

- Discipline: Planetary science, geodesy, geophysics
- Language: English
- Edited by: Dr. Ana Ferreira, Professor Kei Hirose, Dr. Dominique Jault, Professor Chloé Michaut

Publication details
- History: 1967–present
- Publisher: Elsevier
- Frequency: Biweekly
- Impact factor: 2.261 (2020)

Standard abbreviations
- ISO 4: Phys. Earth Planet. Inter.

Indexing
- CODEN: PEPIAM
- ISSN: 0031-9201
- LCCN: sf80001253
- OCLC no.: 878793

Links
- Journal homepage; Online access

Physics of the Earth and Planetary Interiors, established in October 1967, is a biweekly peer-reviewed scientific journal published by Elsevier. The co-editors are A. Ferreira (University College London), K. Hirose (Tokyo Institute of Technology), D. Jault (Grenoble Alpes University), and C. Michaut (Ecole normale superieure de Lyon).

The journal covers the physical and chemical processes of planetary interiors. Topical coverage broadly encompasses planetary physics, geodesy, and geophysics. Publishing formats include original research papers, review articles, short communications and book reviews on a regular basis. Occasional special issues are set aside for proceedings of conferences.

The journal has a 2020 impact factor of 2.261.

== Abstracting and indexing ==
This journal is indexed in the following bibliographic databases:

- Science Citation Index
- Current Contents/Physical, Chemical & Earth Sciences
- Chemical Abstracts Service – CASSI
- AGI's Bibliography and Index of Geology
- GEOBASE
- Inspec
- PASCAL
- Physics Abstracts
- Scopus

== See also ==
- Earth and Planetary Science Letters
- Astronomy & Geophysics
