= Zeitschrift für Geologische Wissenschaften =

- Discipline: Geology, biogeology, geochemistry, paleontology
- Language: English, German
- Edited by: Ulrich Wutzke

Publication details
- History: 1973-present
- Publisher: Verlag für Geowissenschaften Berlin (Germany)
- Frequency: Bimonthly

Standard abbreviations
- ISO 4: Z. Geol. Wiss.

Indexing
- CODEN: ZGWSA7
- ISSN: 0303-4534
- LCCN: 74-640867
- OCLC no.: 1791558

Links
- Journal homepage

The Zeitschrift für Geologische Wissenschaften (English: Journal for the Geological Sciences) is a peer-reviewed German scientific journal established in 1973, that publishes preferably original papers in German and English dealing with geology and related sub-disciplines. Since 2005 the journal has been published bimonthly by the Verlag für Geowissenschaften Berlin. The journal was formerly an official periodical of the national East German Gesellschaft für Geologische Wissenschaften, the East German geological sciences society, and was published by the scientific and academic publishing house Akademie Verlag. The journal was regarded as the most important geological sciences periodical in East Germany with an international reputation. The journal is indexed in: GeoRef, Chemical Abstracts Service, and Geoline.

== Journal contents and structure ==
The journal publishes articles in the following categories:

- Articles, longer scientific reports of national or international interest
- Short Communications used for rapid publication of preliminary scientific results, finding information, or descriptions of outcrops
- Discussions on papers previously published in the journal
