= GeoArabia =

- Discipline: Geoscience
- Language: English

Publication details
- History: 1996-present
- Publisher: Gulf PetroLink (Bahrain)
- Frequency: Quarterly
- Impact factor: 2.026 (2010)

Standard abbreviations
- ISO 4: GeoArabia

Indexing
- ISSN: 1025-6059
- OCLC no.: 609937734

Links
- Journal homepage

GeoArabia is a quarterly peer-reviewed scientific journal covering petroleum geoscience studies in the Middle East. It is published in Bahrain by Gulf PetroLink and was established in 1996. Publications in GeoArabia cover various aspects of geoscience including sedimentology, tectonics, geophysics and petroleum reservoir characterisation.

In October 2018, GeoArabia's electronic library was donated to the non-profit organization GeoscienceWorld to insure that GeoArabia's articles and special publications will remain available to the geoscience community into the far future. The entire GeoArabia library is currently being migrated and will soon become available from their website at https://pubs.geoscienceworld.org/gpl.

== Abstracting and indexing ==
The journal is abstracted and indexed in:

- GeoRef
- Petroleum Abstracts
- Science Citation Index Expanded
- Current Contents/Physical, Chemical and Earth Sciences
- The Zoological Record

According to the Journal Citation Reports, the journal has a 2010 impact factor of 2.026, ranking it first out of 25 journals in the category "Engineering, Petroleum", and 48th out of 167 journals in the category "Geosciences, Multidisciplinary".
