= Sedimentary Geology (journal) =

- Discipline: sedimentology, geology
- Language: English

Publication details
- Publisher: Elsevier
- Open access: No
- Impact factor: 2.665 (2014)

Standard abbreviations
- ISO 4: Sediment. Geol.

Indexing
- ISSN: 0037-0738

Links
- Journal homepage

Sedimentary Geology is a peer-reviewed scientific journal about sediments in a geological context published by Elsevier. About its scope the journal states it ranges "from techniques of sediment analysis to geodynamical aspects of sedimentary-basin evolution.".
