= Climate of the Past =

- Language: English
- Edited by: Nerilie Abram, Laurie Menviel, Denis-Didier Rousseau & Marit-Solveig Seidenkrantz

Publication details
- History: 2005–present
- Publisher: Copernicus Publications for the European Geosciences Union (Germany)
- Open access: Yes
- License: Creative Commons Attribution License
- Impact factor: 4.295 (2020)

Standard abbreviations
- ISO 4: Clim. Past

Indexing
- ISSN: 1814-9324

Links
- Journal homepage

Climate of the Past is an open-access peer-reviewed scientific journal publishing research within Earth science.

== Abstracting and indexing ==
This journal is indexed in the following databases:

- CNKI
- Directory of Open Access Journals
- EBSCO
- GEOBASE
- GeoRef
- Journal Citation Reports
- ProQuest
- Science Citation Index Expanded
- Scopus

According to the Journal Citation Reports, the journal has a 2020 impact factor of 4.295.
