= Geophysical Journal International =

- Discipline: Geophysics
- Language: English
- Edited by: Joerg Renner

Publication details
- Former name(s): See #History
- History: 1988–present
- Publisher: Oxford University Press on behalf of the Royal Astronomical Society and the German Geophysical Society
- Frequency: Monthly
- Impact factor: 3.352 (2021)

Standard abbreviations
- ISO 4: Geophys. J. Int.

Indexing
- CODEN: GJINEA
- ISSN: 0956-540X (print); 1365-246X (web)
- LCCN: 89645558
- OCLC no.: 20060716

Links
- Journal homepage; Online access

Geophysical Journal International (GJI) is a monthly peer-reviewed scientific journal in the field of geophysics. It is published by Oxford University Press on behalf of two learned societies: the Royal Astronomical Society (RAS) and the Deutsche Geophysikalische Gesellschaft (German Geophysical Society, DGG), who select and peer-review the contents.

GJI was formed in 1988 by the merger of three earlier geophysics journals, the oldest of which was established in 1922. The editor-in-chief is Joerg Renner (Ruhr University Bochum).

The journal publishes original research papers, research notes, letters, and book reviews. Its topical scope includes research on all aspects of theoretical, computational, applied and observational geophysics.

== History ==
GJI was formed by a complex series of mergers between previous geophysical journals.

Its origins can be traced to 1919, when the RAS absorbed the Geophysical Committee (which had previously been part of the British Association), thereby becoming the learned society responsible for British geophysics. This led to an increase in the number of geophysical papers being published in the Monthly Notices of the RAS (MNRAS). In 1922 it was decided to separate the geophysical papers from those on astronomy, by issuing the Geophysical Supplement to Monthly Notices. These were not published on a regular schedule, but instead issued whenever a sufficient number of geophysical papers were ready for publication, and distributed to MNRAS subscribers. This arrangement continued for several decades, until the International Geophysical Year of 1957-58 brought renewed attention to the subject. This prompted the RAS to convert the supplements to a separate journal, which began publishing in 1958 as Geophysical Journal. (Note: Sometimes referred to as Geophysical Journal of the RAS to distinguish it from other journals with similar names) In 1970, it established an office in the United States to handle the increasing number of submissions from North America.

Meanwhile in Germany, the DGG was founded in 1922 and in 1924 began publishing the German language journal Zeitschrift für Geophysik (lit. Journal for Geophysics). From 1954 it was published in partnership with Physica-Verlag. In 1973 the publisher was acquired by Springer Verlag, who began including papers in English and changed the journal's name to the bilingual Journal of Geophysics – Zeitschrift für Geophysik.

In France, the CNRS began publishing Annales de Géophysique (lit. Annals of Geophysics) in 1944. In Italy, the Annali di Geofisica (also lit. Annals of Geophysics) began publishing in 1948, by the Istituto Nazionale di Geofisica. These two journals merged in 1983, under the auspices of the European Geophysical Society (EGS), with the combined journal given the name Annales Geophysicae (the Latin translation of both names). In 1986 this split into two series, A and B, with content relevant to GJI being published in Annales Geophysicae, Series B: Terrestrial and Planetary Physics.

Finally, these three branches of journals merged in 1988. The RAS's Geophysical Journal, the DGG's Journal of Geophysics and the EGS's Annales Geophysicae, Series B were combined and published jointly by the three societies. (Note: Annales Geophysicae, Series A was not included in the merger. It was renamed simply Annales Geophysicae and continued to be published by EGS.) The new merged journal retained the name Geophysical Journal for one year, (Note: sometimes referred to as Geophysical Journal (Oxford) to distinguish it from the earlier RAS-only journal) before adopting its current name Geophysical Journal International in 1989. Volume numbering continued from the earlier RAS-only journal. When the EGS merged into the European Geosciences Union in 2002, the new body decided not to continue involvement with GJI, leaving it under the control of the RAS and DGG, which is the current arrangement.

== Abstracting and indexing ==
The journal is abstracted and indexed in:

- Chemical Abstracts Service - CASSI
- Advanced Polymer Abstracts
- Ceramic Abstracts
- Civil Engineering Abstracts
- Computer Information & Technology Abstracts
- Earthquake Engineering Abstracts
- Engineered Materials Abstracts
- International Aerospace Abstracts & Database
- Materials Business File
- Meteorological & Geoastrophysical Abstracts
- Mechanical & Transportation Engineering Abstracts
- Technology Research Database
- METADEX
- Academic Search, Academic Search Premier
- Environmental Issues & Policy Index
- Elsevier BIOBASE
- EMBASE/Excerpta Medica
- GEOBASE/Geographical & Geological Abstracts
- Current Contents/Physical, Chemical & Earth Sciences
- Science Citation Index
- Current Index to Statistics
- InfoTrac
- Petroleum Abstracts
- Scopus

According to the Journal Citation Reports, the journal has a 2021 impact factor of 3.352, ranking it 35th out of 100 journals in the category "Geochemistry & Geophysics".
