= Irina Artemieva =

Danish professor (born 1961)

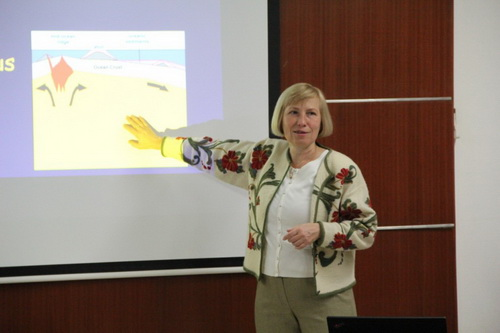
- Irina giving an academic report at the Institute of Geology and Geophysics, Chinese Academy of Sciences in November 2015
- Born: August 4, 1961 (age 65); Moscow, Russian SFSR, USSR
- Citizenship: Denmark
- Known for: Research in lithosphere structure and evolution
- Awards: Augustus Love Medal of the European Geosciences Union (2021)
- Scientific career
- Fields: Geodynamics
- Workplaces: Stanford University, University of Copenhagen, U.S. Geological Survey, University of Strasbourg, University of Uppsala, USSR Academy of Sciences

Irina M. Artemieva (born August 4, 1961) is a Danish geophysicist and professor. She works with the Chinese Academy of Geological Sciences (CAGS). Her research focuses on global and regional studies of the Earth's lithosphere.

== Education ==
Artemieva graduated from the Physics Faculty of Lomonosov Moscow State University in 1984 with degrees in physics. In 1987, she earned a PhD in physics and mathematics with a focus on geophysics from the Schmidt Institute of Physics of the Earth, Russian Academy of Sciences. In 2007, she received a doctor scientiarum degree in geosciences from the University of Copenhagen.

== Awards and honours ==
- 2000 Elected Fellow of the Royal Astronomical Society
- 2007 Elected to the Academia Europaea
- 2012 Elected Fellow of the Geological Society of America
- 2014 Elected to the Royal Danish Academy of Sciences and Letters
- 2018 Elected to the International Eurasian Academy of Sciences
- 2021 Awarded the Augustus Love Medal of the European Geosciences Union

== Research and publications ==
Artemieva's research concentrates on the structure and evolution of the lithosphere, with particular focus on the geodynamics of back-arc basins and cratons from the Archean and Precambrian Earth to modern collisional tectonics. It focuses on the global and regional structure of the Earth's crust, lithosphere thickness, thermal and compositional heterogeneity of the lithosphere mantle, lithosphere formation, and secular evolution.

Artemieva is the author of the 2011 Cambridge University Press research monograph on the current state-of-knowledge in lithosphere studies based on a full set of geophysical methods complemented by petrologic and laboratory data on rock properties.

In 2006, Artemieva published a global database of the continental lithosphere's thermal thickness and ages.

In 2009, Artemieva developed methods to evaluate heterogeneity in the thermal state, chemical composition and thickness of the lithosphere on a global and regional scale.

== Career ==
From 1999 to 2001, Artemieva was an associate professor at Uppsala University, Sweden. In 2002, she began work at the École et Observatoire des Sciences de la Terre at Strasbourg University. From 2003 to 2004, she worked as a Senior Researcher at the United States Geological Survey in Menlo Park, where she had been an annual visitor for 3–4 months since 1995.

In 2005, Artemieva became an associate professor at the University of Copenhagen, funded by personal research grants from Carlsbergfondet (Denmark) during 2005–2006 and 2007–2009. In 2010, Artemieva was one of six winners of the Freja Grant from the University of Copenhagen in Natural Sciences. She won funding bids in 2011–2013 and 2014–2018 for "large research grants" from Danish national funding agencies (Independent Research Fund Denmark - Danmarks Frie Forskningsfond/ DFF), which paid her salary at the University of Copenhagen in 2011–2018. In 2013, she won in an open call the position of Professor of Geophysics at the University of Copenhagen, where she worked until 2019.

In 2019–2020, Artemieva was a visiting professor at Stanford University, and her sabbatical stay was funded by the Royal Danish Academy of Sciences and Letters. In 2020, she moved to GEOMAR Helmholtz Centre for Ocean Research Kiel (Kiel, Germany). In 2022, Artemieva was invited by the Chinese Academy of Geological Sciences as Distinguished Professor to the SinoProbe National Laboratory, following her affiliation in 2019 as Distinguished Professor with the China University of Geosciences (Wuhan).

=== Leadership positions ===
Artemieva was the Science Coordinator and Executive Board member of the European Science Foundation (ESF) EUROPROBE program (1999–2001). Within the European Geosciences Union, she served on the EGU Council and EGU Program Committee from 2013 to 2017 as Geodynamics Division President. She has been a member of the EGU Arthur Holmes and Augustus Love medal committees of the European Geosciences Union and a referee for the Crafoord Prize of the Royal Swedish Academy of Sciences.

In 2021, Artemieva was elected President of the European Geosciences Union; before her inauguration as Vice-President in February 2022, she was proposed by the EGU Executive to step down due to her national background. Artemieva served as Vice-President from 2022 to 2023 and as President of the European Geosciences Union from 2023 to 2024. She left the EGU President post following a conflict among the EGU Executives that escalated at EGU24 General Assembly when the EGU24 abstract from the criticized organization was withdrawn based on an undocumented claim of the alleged breach of conduct. The decision made by EGU Executive Board members without approval by Artemieva was later acknowledged by the EGU Council as incorrect. In May 2024, as EGU President Artemieva established the Extraordinary Committee to assess actions by EGU Executive Board members, repeatedly reported by the EGU24 participants as inappropriate. The EGU Executive Board dismissed the Extraordinary Committee called by Artemieva and, following a resolution from the volunteer council, removed Artemieva as President of the EGU based on claims of the alleged breach of conduct and her earlier requests to see employment contracts of the EGU staff paid by the membership money.

She is the editor-in-chief of the Journal of Geodynamics (2016–2025) and an associated editor for Scientific Reports (Nature Publishing Group) since 2014. She previously served as associate editor in Tectonophysics (2006–2020) and topical editor of the EGU journal Solid Earth (2010–2016).
