= Ocean Science (journal) =

Open-access peer-reviewed scientific journal

- Discipline: Oceanography
- Language: English
- Edited by: Karen J. Heywood, Mario Hoppema, Bernadette Sloyan & Anne Marie Treguier

Publication details
- History: 2005-present
- Publisher: Copernicus Publications on behalf of the European Geosciences Union
- Open access: Yes
- License: Creative Commons Attribution 4.0 License
- Impact factor: 3.416 (2020)

Standard abbreviations
- ISO 4: Ocean Sci.

Indexing
- ISSN: 1812-0784 (print); 1812-0792 (web)
- OCLC no.: 58479598

Links
- Journal homepage; Online access

Ocean Science is an open-access peer-reviewed scientific journal published by Copernicus Publications on behalf of the European Geosciences Union. It covers all aspects of oceanography. The journal is available on-line and in print. Papers are published under the Creative Commons Attribution 4.0 license.

The editor-in-chief is Karen J. Heywood. The founding editors were David Webb (National Oceanography Centre) and John Johnson (University of East Anglia).

== Peer-review process ==
The journal makes use of an open reviewing process developed for Atmospheric Chemistry and Physics by its editor, Ulrich Pöschl, and colleagues. Submissions considered suitable for review are first published as unreviewed grey literature in the sister discussion journal Ocean Science Discussions. They are then subject to interactive public discussion, during which the referees' comments (anonymous or attributed), additional short comments by other members of the scientific community (attributed), and the authors' replies are also published. Authors then have a chance to revise their papers in response to the issues raised and the review process is completed in the normal manner.

After final acceptance, papers are published on-line as soon as authors have approved the typeset version. The printed version of the journal, which is published bimonthly, includes all papers published on-line since the last printed issue.

== Abstracting and indexing ==
The journal is abstracted and indexed in Science Citation Index Expanded, Scopus, Chemical Abstracts, and GeoRef. According to the Journal Citation Reports, the journal has a 2020 impact factor of 3.416.

== See also ==
- List of scientific journals in earth and atmospheric sciences
