= Nonlinear Processes in Geophysics =

- Discipline: Geophysics
- Language: English
- Edited by: Christian Franzke, Ana M. Mancho, Daniel Schertzer, & Olivier Talagrand

Publication details
- History: 1994–present
- Publisher: Copernicus Publications for the European Geosciences Union (Germany)
- Open access: Yes
- License: Creative Commons Attribution License
- Impact factor: 2.200 (2022)

Standard abbreviations
- ISO 4: Nonlinear Process. Geophys.

Indexing
- ISSN: 1023-5809

Links
- Journal homepage

Nonlinear Processes in Geophysics is an open-access peer-reviewed scientific journal publishing research within Earth science.

== Abstracting and indexing ==
This journal is indexed in the following databases:

- Astrophysics Data System
- CNKI
- Directory of Open Access Journals
- EBSCO
- GEOBASE
- GeoRef
- Journal Citation Reports
- ProQuest
- Science Citation Index Expanded
- Scopus

According to the Journal Citation Reports, the journal has a 2020 impact factor of 1.740.
