= Atmospheric Measurement Techniques =

- Discipline: Atmospheric sciences
- Language: English
- Edited by: Hartwig Harder, Simone Lolli, Marloes Penning de Vries, Andreas Richter, Mingjin Tang, Rebecca Washenfelder

Publication details
- History: 2008–present
- Publisher: Copernicus Publications on behalf of the European Geosciences Union
- Frequency: Semi-monthly
- Open access: Yes
- License: Creative Commons Attribution License
- Impact factor: 3.2 (2023)

Standard abbreviations
- ISO 4: Atmos. Meas. Tech.

Indexing
- CODEN: AMTTC2
- ISSN: 1867-1381 (print); 1867-8548 (web)
- LCCN: 2009204208
- OCLC no.: 489540147

Links
- Journal homepage; Online access; Online archive

Atmospheric Measurement Techniques is a semi-monthly peer-reviewed open-access scientific journal covering research within atmospheric sciences. It was established in 2008 and is published by Copernicus Publications on behalf of the European Geosciences Union. The editors-in-chief are Hartwig Harder (Max Planck Institute for Chemistry), Simone Lolli (National Research Council (Italy)), Marloes Penning de Vries (University of Twente), Andreas Richter (University of Bremen), Mingjin Tang (Tianjin University) and Rebecca Washenfelder (University of Colorado).

== Abstracting and indexing ==
This journal is abstracted and indexed in:

- Chemical Abstracts Service
- Current Contents/Physical, Chemical & Earth Sciences
- Directory of Open Access Journals
- EBSCO databases
- GEOBASE
- GeoRef
- ProQuest databases
- Science Citation Index Expanded
- Scopus

According to the Journal Citation Reports, the journal has a 2023 impact factor of 3.2.
