= Hydrology and Earth System Sciences =

- Discipline: Hydrology
- Language: English
- Edited by: Theresa Blume, Alberto Guadagnini

Publication details
- History: 1997-present
- Publisher: Copernicus Publications on behalf of the European Geosciences Union
- Frequency: Monthly
- Open access: Yes
- License: Creative Commons Attribution 4.0
- Impact factor: 6.617 (2021)

Standard abbreviations
- ISO 4: Hydrol. Earth Syst. Sci.

Indexing
- CODEN: HESSCF
- ISSN: 1027-5606 (print); 1607-7938 (web)
- LCCN: 00220422
- OCLC no.: 54681644

Links
- Journal homepage; Online access

Hydrology and Earth System Sciences is a monthly peer-reviewed open access scientific journal that covers research in hydrology and related fields like water resource management. The journal is published by Copernicus Publications on behalf of the European Geosciences Union. It was established in 1997 and the editors-in-chief are Theresa Blume (German Research Centre for Geosciences) and Alberto Guadagnini (Polytechnic University of Milan).

== Abstracting and indexing ==
The journal is abstracted and indexed in the following bibliographic databases:

- Astrophysics Data System
- AGRICOLA
- CAB Abstracts
- Chemical Abstracts
- Current Contents/Physical, Chemical, and Earth Sciences
- EBSCO daatabases
- Ei Compendex
- GeoBase
- GeoRef
- ProQuest databases
- Science Citation Index Expanded
- Scopus

According to the Journal Citation Reports, the journal has a 2021 impact factor of 6.617.
