= Jonathan Bamber =

British physicist

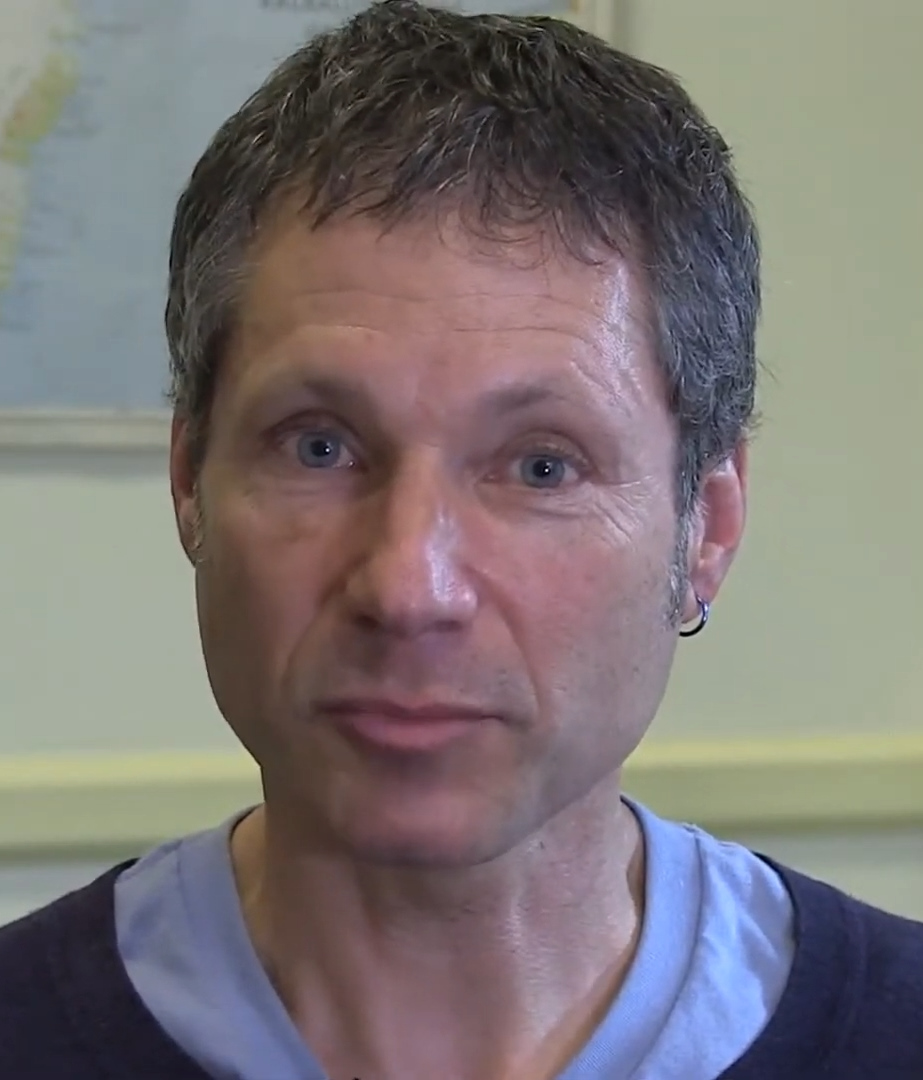
Jonathan Bamber in 2015

Jonathan Louis Bamber is a British physicist known for his work on satellite remote sensing of the polar regions, and especially the Antarctic and Greenland ice sheets. He has authored more than 200 refereed scientific publications about the cryosphere and its interaction with the rest of the Earth System, and is recognized by the Institute for Scientific Information as a "highly cited researcher". In 2019, he was elected a fellow of the American Geophysical Union "for pioneering satellite remote sensing in glaciology and building bridges to other disciplines of the geoscience community."

== Background ==
Bamber is the son of Helen Bamber, who was a British psychotherapist and human rights activist, and Rudi Bamber, a first generation Holocaust survivor. Rudi's testimony is held as part of the oral history of the Holocaust at the London Imperial War Museum, where Helen also recorded her experiences of the Bergen-Belsen concentration camp after its liberation.

== Education ==
Bamber went to Creighton Comprehensive school in North London, before studying physics at the University of Bristol, earning a BSc in 1983 and a PhD from the University of Cambridge in glaciology and remote sensing in 1987.

== Research and appointments ==
Bamber spent eight years in the Department of Space and Climate Physics, University College London, before returning to the University of Bristol to the Department of Geography in 1996, where he has worked since. His focus has been on satellite observations of the Antarctic and Greenland ice sheets, but he has also studied other parts of the cryosphere in the Arctic, Patagonia, and Himalaya. In 2013, he published a paper on the discovery of the longest canyon in the world, buried beneath the Greenland ice sheet, which has been dubbed the "Grand Canyon" of Greenland. His work also looks at the different factors that influence contemporary sea level variations funded by the European Research Council and the role of freshwater fluxes from Arctic land ice on ocean circulation. His work on the ice sheets and sea level has been adopted in several Intergovernmental Panel on Climate Change reports, including the Assessment Report 4 and 5, Special Report 1.5, Special Report on the Ocean and Cryosphere, and has been highlighted by the World Economic Forum.

== Awards and honors ==
In 2007, Bamber was given the European Geosciences Union Service award "in recognition of his outstanding services with regard to the initiation and leading of the division on Cryosphere Sciences and to the founding of the journal The Cryosphere". In 2015, he was given a Royal Society Wolfson Merit Award. In 2015, he was elected as the president of the European Geosciences Union, serving for four years as president-elect and president. In 2019 he was made a fellow of the American Geophysical Union. In December 2020, the UK Antarctic Place-Names Committee named a glacier in the Antarctic Peninsula after Bamber for his contribution to Antarctic research.

== Personal life ==
Bamber is a mountaineer, climber and long-distance runner. In 1990, he climbed the 1938 route on the North Face of the Eiger with Wil Hurford. He won his first major running race in 1991 at the Woodley 10 mile road race in a time of 54 minutes.

A year later in 1992, while climbing in the Indian Himalaya, close to the Pakistan border, he was hit by a rockfall and sustained life-threatening injuries to his left leg. It took six days to get him off the mountain, and he contracted gangrene and frostbite. He spent almost four years on crutches before being able to take a few steps unaided.

Ten years after his climbing accident, two days before his 40th birthday, he ran and won a half marathon in Somerset. Since then, he has competed in races over various distances, winning a number outright and in his age category, at distances of 5 to 50 miles.

In the next year, he teamed up with the first international runner from the Everest marathon to compete in the eight-day TransAlpineRun, covering 280km and a 16,500 m ascent, starting in Germany and finishing in Italy. His running partner retired after the fifth stage, but Bamber continued and completed the course in a time of 41 hours, 57 minutes.

In 2015, a team of three Swiss climbers made the first ascent of the mountain Tupendeo, which Bamber had attempted 23 years earlier. They made a movie about their ascent and Bamber's ordeal that premiered at the Kendal Mountain Festival in 2016 and was subsequently shown at other outdoor film festivals across Europe. It was also aired on German and Swiss television.
