= Lily Pereg =

Microbial ecologist (1964–2019)

- לילי פרג
- Born: 1964; Israel
- Died: January 2019 (aged 54–55); Mendoza, Argentina

Academic background
- Education: University of Sydney

Lily Pereg (Hebrew: לילי פרג; 1964–2019) was an Australian microbiologist who was born in Israel. She completed a bachelor's degree at Ben Gurion University and a master's degree at Tel Aviv University. She moved to Australia in the 1990s to undertake a PhD at the University of Sydney, which she completed in 1998. Following this, she completed a Postdoctoral Research Fellowship at the University of Cologne, Germany. In May 2001, Pereg took up an appointment in the School of Science and Technology at the University of New England, where she was promoted to Professor of Microbiology in 2018.

Pereg's research focused on soil microbial ecology and plant-microbial interactions. She taught microbiology, biochemistry and biotechnology at the University of New England. Pereg was an active member in the European Geosciences Union community since 2013, having been executive editor of SOIL, an EGU and Copernicus open access journal in 2014, and receiving the Soil System Sciences Division (SSS) Best Convener award for her work in 2015. She became chair of the SSS Division Soil Biology, Microbiology and Biodiversity Subdivision in 2016, and was elected as President of the European Geosciences Union SSS Division in Autumn 2017, a position she was due to take up in April 2019.

Pereg and her sister were found dead in Mendoza, Argentina, in January 2019, presumed to have been murdered by Pereg's nephew. Following his arrest and trial, Gil Pereg was sentenced to life in a secure psychiatric institute for the murders where he subsequently died from unknown causes in 2019.
