= Biogeosciences =

- Language: English
- Edited by: Michael Bahn, Steven Bouillon, Anja Rammig, Tina Treude

Publication details
- History: 2004–present
- Publisher: Copernicus Publications for the European Geosciences Union (Germany)
- Open access: Yes
- License: Creative Commons Attribution License
- Impact factor: 3.9 (2024)

Standard abbreviations
- ISO 4: Biogeosciences

Indexing
- ISSN: 1726-4170 (print); 1726-4189 (web)
- OCLC no.: 56326504

Links
- Journal homepage

Biogeosciences is an open-access peer-reviewed scientific journal of the European Geosciences Union launched in 2004 by editors-in-chief Jean-Pierre Gattuso and Jürgen Kesselmeier. It covers all aspects of the interactions between the biological, chemical, and physical processes in terrestrial or extraterrestrial life with the geosphere, hydrosphere, and atmosphere. It cuts across the boundaries of established sciences and achieve an interdisciplinary view of these interactions.

== Abstracting and indexing ==
This journal is indexed in the following databases:

- AGORA
- AGRICOLA
- CAB Abstracts
- CNKI
- Chemical Abstracts Service
- Directory of Open Access Journals
- EBSCO
- GEOBASE
- GeoRef
- Journal Citation Reports
- ProQuest
- Science Citation Index Expanded
- Scopus

According to the Journal Citation Reports, the journal has a 2024 impact factor of 3.9.
