= Annales Geophysicae =

- Discipline: Earth and atmospheric sciences
- Language: English
- Edited by: Ioannis A. Daglis, Christoph Jacobi & Ingrid Mann

Publication details
- History: 1983–present
- Publisher: Copernicus Publications for the European Geosciences Union (Germany)
- Frequency: Bimonthly
- Open access: Yes
- License: Creative Commons Attribution License
- Impact factor: 1.9 (2022)

Standard abbreviations
- ISO 4: Ann. Geophys.

Indexing
- CODEN: ANNGEA
- ISSN: 0992-7689

Links
- Journal homepage

Annales Geophysicae is an open-access peer-reviewed scientific journal publishing research within Earth science. It is published by Copernicus Publications on a bimonthly basis.

== History ==
The journal traces its history back to Bollettino della Societa Sismologica Italiana, established in 1895 by the Italian Seismological Society. The journal was then absorbed into the new Annali di Geofisica in 1948.

Separately, Annales de Géophysique, published by the Centre National de la Recherche Scientifique, was established in 1942.

In 1983, both Annali di Geofisica and Annales de Géophysique merged into the modern title Annales Geophysicae, then published by Gauthiers-Villars. In 1986, the journal split into Annales Geophysicae, Series A and Annales Geophysicae, Series B.

Series B then merged with the Geophysical Journal of the Royal Astronomical Society and Journal of Geophysics to form the Geophysical Journal. Series A then reverted to simply being called Annales Geophysicae, and merged with the remaining parts of Series B. It is now published by Copernicus Publications.

== Abstracting and indexing ==
This journal is indexed in the following databases:

- Astrophysics Data System
- CAB Abstracts
- CNKI
- Chemical Abstracts Service
- Directory of Open Access Journals
- EBSCO
- GEOBASE
- GeoRef
- Journal Citation Reports
- ProQuest
- Science Citation Index Expanded
- Scopus

According to the Journal Citation Reports, the journal has a 2020 impact factor of 1.880.
