= Mike Pinnock =

British physicist

Mike Pinnock (born 6 March 1954) is a British scientist in the field of polar research and was one of the longest serving managers of the British Antarctic Survey until his retirement in 2018. He is currently a BAS Emeritus Fellow which invites select former employees to continue to develop their scientific and scholarly work through a continued relationship with the organisation. He is a treasurer and board member for Antarctic Science Journal. He has published 76 papers, mostly on the topic of solar wind coupling to the Earth's magnetosphere.

== Career ==
Pinnock trained as an electronics engineer and began his career at a subsidiary of General Electric Company Telecommunications.

He joined BAS in 1976 and wintered at Halley Research Station in 1977, 1978 and 1981.

In 1986, Pinnock became the project manager for the construction of the Halley SuperDARN radar, part of an international network of scientific radars. The radar enhanced understanding of how the solar wind interacts with the Earth's magnetosphere and upper atmosphere.

In 2004 Pinnock was appointed Head of Physical Sciences Division and joined the BAS Board.

In 2009 he was promoted to Board Member for Science Delivery.

From 2010 to 2015 he was editor-in-chief of the EGU journal, Annales Geophysicae.

Pinnock partly retired in 2014 but remained with the organisation in the capacity of project support to the BAS directors. He retired in 2018.

In 2020 he graduated with a BA Hons degree in Politics, Philosophy and Economics from the Open University.

== Awards ==
He was awarded a Polar Medal by HM Queen Elizabeth II in 1985 for outstanding achievements in the field of polar research.

In 2015, he was awarded a second clasp to his Polar Medal.

In 2020, the Government of the British Antarctic Territory announced they would be naming a nunatak range after him.
