= Karen Aplin =

British atmospheric and space physicist

Karen Aplin is a British atmospheric and space physicist. She is currently a professor at the University of Bristol. Aplin has made significant contributions to interdisciplinary aspects of space and terrestrial science, in particular the importance of electrical effects on planetary atmospheres. She was awarded the 2021 James Dungey Lectureship of the Royal Astronomical Society.

== Education and research career ==
After attending The High School, Gloucester, Aplin completed a BSc in Natural Sciences at Durham University in 1997. She was president of Durham University Orchestral Society and received the Norah C. Bowes bequest for the arts. She completed her PhD in experimental atmospheric physics in the Department of Meteorology at the University of Reading in 2000. She took up research posts at the University of Hertfordshire and the STFC Rutherford Appleton Laboratory, working on aspects of space and atmospheric instrumentation, before becoming head of the physics laboratories at Oxford University in 2009. In 2018 she moved to the University of Bristol.

== Work on atmospheric electricity ==
Aplin's research has focussed on innovative instrumentation as applied to problems in space and atmospheric science, in particular electrical effects and measurements. She currently maintains the Snowdon space-weather observatory. She has performed experimental work on the atmospheric effects of ions formed by cosmic rays, but has been keen to stress that the formed "particles are too small to act as cloud condensation nuclei", and thus there is unlikely to be a strong cosmic-ray link to global cloud cover.

Her work on atmospheric electricity also extends to the link between volcanoes, lightning and radon gas, and to other solar system bodies, in particular the ultraviolet and galactic cosmic ray effects on Neptune's atmosphere.

In a similarly interdisciplinary spirit, Aplin has researched the influence of the climate and weather on western orchestral composers.

== Awards and recognition ==
2021: James Dungey Lectureship of the Royal Astronomical Society.

2019: Visiting professor at the University of Bath (previously visiting senior research fellow)

2015 – present: Editor of the Journal of Electrostatics

2009 – present: Editor for the open-access journal History of Geo- and Space Sciences
