= Solid Earth (journal) =

- Discipline: Earth science
- Language: English
- Edited by: Charlotte Krawczyk

Publication details
- History: 2010–present
- Publisher: Copernicus Publications for the European Geosciences Union
- Open access: Yes
- License: Creative Commons Attribution License
- Impact factor: 2.083 (2015)

Standard abbreviations
- ISO 4: Solid Earth

Indexing
- ISSN: 1869-9510 (print); 1869-9529 (web)
- LCCN: 2012204149
- OCLC no.: 891513367

Links
- Journal homepage; Online archive

Solid Earth is a peer-reviewed open-access scientific journal covering Earth science, more specifically the solid Earth aspects. It was established in 2010 and is published by Copernicus Publications for the European Geosciences Union.

== Abstracting and indexing ==
The journal is abstracted and indexed in:

- Current Contents/Physical, Chemical & Earth Sciences
- EBSCO databases
- Ei Compendex
- GEOBASE
- GeoRef
- ProQuest databases
- Science Citation Index Expanded
- Scopus

According to the Journal Citation Reports, the journal has a 2015 impact factor of 2.083.
