= Katja Fennel =

Professor and oceanographer

- Education: University of Rostock
- Known for: Former Canada Research Chair (Tier II) in Marine Prediction
- Website: http://memg.ocean.dal.ca/fennel/

Katja Fennel is an oceanographer studying the effects of climate change on marine ecosystems. She is a full professor in the Department of Oceanography at Dalhousie University, a former Canada Research Chair in marine prediction, and co-editor-in-chief of the journal Biogeosciences.

== Life ==
Katja Fennel was born in Rostock. Her father was a professor and oceanographer at the Leibniz Institute for Baltic Sea Research. Her brother is professor for theoretical physics at the University of Rostock.

Katja Fennel studied mathematics at the University of Rostock, where she wrote her diploma thesis in numerical Analysis about the Ekman layer. She received her PhD in 1998 with a thesis in the field of marine biology. After postdoctoral work at the Alfred Wegener Institute's Helmholtz Centre for Polar and Marine Research and Oregon State University, she became an assistant professor at Rutgers University in 2002. Four years later she moved to Dalhousie University as a Canada Research Chair in marine prediction. She is currently a full professor in the Dalhousie University Department of Oceanography.

Fennel's research focuses on the development and use of computational models to predict and understand marine ecosystems, particularly the causes and effects of changes in oxygen and carbon levels. Her publications have been cited thousands of times. Her work was part of a 2018 publication in Nature Climate Change that found a link between current flows and rapid deoxygenation of the Gulf of St. Lawrence, which the team attributed to broader changes in ocean flows as part of climate change. Fennel is co-editor-in-chief of Biogeosciences, an open access journal covering the earth sciences. In 2018 Fennel was the Ian Morris Scholar in Residence at the Center for Environmental Science at the University of Maryland. In 2019 she was announced as a keynote speaker at the 12th Baltic Sea Science Congress.

Fennel has over 200 publications, resulting in over 5,700 citations, and an h-index and i10-index of 37 and 83 respectively.

== Selected publications ==
- Fennel, Katja; Losch, Martin; Schröter, Jens; Wenzel, Manfred (2001-02-01). "Testing a marine ecosystem model: sensitivity analysis and parameter optimization" (PDF). Journal of Marine Systems. 28 (1/2): 45–63. Bibcode:2001JMS....28...45F. doi:10.1016/S0924-7963(00)00083-X.
- Fennel, Katja; Boss, Emmanuel (2003-07-01). "Subsurface maxima of phytoplankton and chlorophyll: Steady-state solutions from a simple model". Limnology and Oceanography. 48 (4): 1521–1534. Bibcode:2003LimOc..48.1521F. doi:10.4319/lo.2003.48.4.1521.
- Fennel, Katja; Wilkin, John; Levin, Julia; Moisan, John; O'Reilly, John; Haidvogel, Dale (2006). "Nitrogen cycling in the Middle Atlantic Bight: Results from a three-dimensional model and implications for the North Atlantic nitrogen budget". Global Biogeochemical Cycles. 20 (3): n/a. Bibcode:2006GBioC..20.3007F. doi:10.1029/2005GB002456. S2CID 12547056.
- Haidvogel, Dale B; Arango, H; Budgell, W Paul; Cornuelle, Bruce D; Curchitser, Enrique; Di Lorenzo, Emanuele; Fennel, Katja; Geyer, W Rockwell; Hermann, Albert J; Lanerolle, Lyon; Levin, Julia; McWilliams, James C; Miller, Arthur J; Moore, Andrew M; Powell, Thomas M; Shchepetkin, Alexander F; Sherwood, Christopher R; Signell, Richard P; Warner, John C; Wilkin, John (2008-03-20). "Ocean forecasting in terrain-following coordinates: Formulation and skill assessment of the Regional Ocean Modeling System". Journal of Computational Physics. 227 (7): 3595–3624. Bibcode:2008JCoPh.227.3595H. doi:10.1016/j.jcp.2007.06.016.
- Claret, Mariona; Galbraith, Eric D; Palter, Jaime B; Bianchi, Daniele; Fennel, Katja; Gilbert, Denis; Dunne, John P (2018-09-17). "Rapid coastal deoxygenation due to ocean circulation shift in the northwest Atlantic". Nature Climate Change. 8 (10): 868. Bibcode:2018NatCC...8..868C. doi:10.1038/s41558-018-0263-1. PMC 6218011. PMID 30416585.
