= Wyborn =

Wyborn is a surname. Notable people with this surname include:

- Kerry Wyborn (born 1977), Australian softball player
- Lesley Wyborn, Australian geoscientist

== See also ==
- Wyborn Reef Light, a lighthouse in northern Queensland, Australia
- Wyburn
