= History of Geo- and Space Sciences =

- Language: English
- Edited by: Kristian Schlegel

Publication details
- History: 2010–present
- Publisher: Copernicus Publications (Germany)
- Open access: Yes
- License: Creative Commons Attribution License
- Impact factor: 0.263 (2015)

Standard abbreviations
- ISO 4: Hist. Geo-Space Sci.

Indexing
- ISSN: 2190-5010

Links
- Journal homepage

History of Geo- and Space Sciences is an open-access peer-reviewed scientific journal publishing research within Earth science.

== Abstracting and indexing ==
This journal is indexed in the following databases:

- Astrophysics Data System
- CNKI
- Directory of Open Access Journals
- EBSCO
- GEOBASE
- GeoRef
- Journal Citation Reports
- ProQuest
- Science Citation Index Expanded
- Scopus
- Social Sciences Citation Index

According to the Journal Citation Reports, the journal has a 2015 impact factor of 0.263.
