= Earth Surface Dynamics =

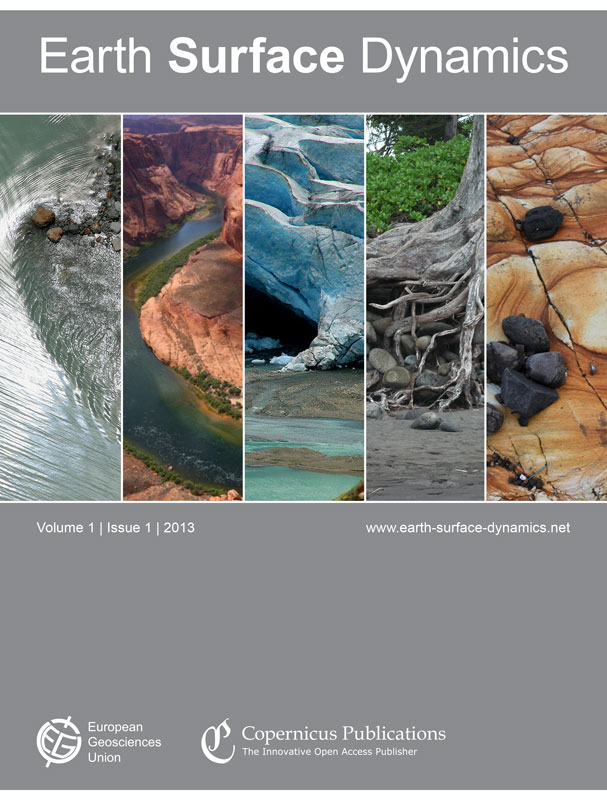
- Discipline: Geomorphology and related fields
- Language: English
- Edited by: Tom Coulthard

Publication details
- History: 2013–present
- Publisher: Copernicus Publications on behalf of the European Geosciences Union
- Impact factor: 4.390 (2020)

Standard abbreviations
- ISO 4: Earth Surf. Dyn.

Indexing
- ISSN: 2196-6311 (print); 2196-632X (web)
- OCLC no.: 898492431
- Discussion papers
- ISSN: 2196-6338

Links
- Journal homepage

Earth Surface Dynamics is a peer-reviewed open access scientific journal published by Copernicus Publications on behalf of the European Geosciences Union. It covers Earth-surface processes, including geomorphology, whether physical, chemical, or biological. The editor-in-chief is Tom Coulthard (University of Hull). As of 18 June 2015, it has been accepted by Thompson-Reuters to be indexed in the Science Citation Index Expanded, the Journal Citation Reports, and Current Contents/Physical Chemical and Earth Sciences.

== See also ==
- List of scientific journals in earth and atmospheric sciences
