= Ning Zeng =

Climate scientist and academic

Ning Zeng is an American climate scientist and academic. He is a professor at the University of Maryland.

He is primarily known for his work in the field of carbon sequestration. He is considered a pioneer amongst scientists of biomass burial, and has been researching in the area for over a decade. He has written papers proposing the 'Wood Vault', a process by which woody biomass is buried as a means to slow re-entry of CO_{2} into the atmosphere through the carbon cycle.

He has argued that one of the easiest targets for the removal of CO_{2} from the atmosphere is to bury wood that would otherwise be mulched, burned, or simply left to rot. In the United States alone, 'unexploited wood residuals' represent around 300 megatons of annual carbon dioxide emissions. He has also advocated for his carbon sequestration techniques as a possible method to mitigate fire risk in the American West and other parts of the world.

Zeng first formally proposed his idea of 'Carbon sequestration via wood burial' in the Carbon Balance and Management journal in 2008. Since then, he has continued research in the area and published a follow-up paper proposing the 'Wood Vault' in a 2022 paper co-authored with Henry Hausmann. this paper highlighted a number of potential approaches; including storing biomass in frozen sites, underwater, or even in above-ground shelters.

In 2021, Zeng was listed on Reuter's list of 'hot climate scientists'. He is member of the editorial board at the scientific journal Earth System Dynamics.
