= Michael Rycroft =

British physicist (born 1938)

Michael John Rycroft (born 15 July 1938) is an English ionospheric physicist.

== Early life ==
After Merchant Taylors' School, Northwood (1951–57) his first degree was in physics from Imperial College London (1960) and his PhD was in meteorological physics from Churchill College Cambridge (1964), supervised by Dr T.W. Wormell who had in turn been supervised by Prof C.T.R. Wilson.

== Career ==
His research is principally in solar-terrestrial physics and atmospheric electricity. In 1977, he was a British finalist in a selection process for European astronauts. He began his career at the University of Southampton (1966-1979) and then moved to the British Antarctic Survey (1979-1990), where he became director of physical science. Subsequently, he was professor of aerospace at Cranfield University (1990-1994), then at the International Space University where he remains emeritus professor. He was a visiting senior research fellow at the Department of Electronic and Electrical Engineering, University of Bath (2006-2016). He is also a member of the Academia Europaea and was general secretary of the European Geophysical Society from 1996 to 2003 (part of the European Geosciences Union).

He has published around 170 papers in the refereed literature, edited a significant encyclopedia, and co-authored two books on space research. He is currently editor-in-chief of the journal Surveys in Geophysics and was, until 1999, editor-in-chief of Journal of Atmospheric and Solar-Terrestrial Physics. He edited a Golden Jubilee edition of this journal to commemorate its 50th anniversary in 2000, and wrote a highly cited paper on the global atmospheric electric circuit for the same issue. On 16 November 2018 a special symposium was held in Bath, UK, to mark Rycroft's 80th birthday, with a biographical tribute paper published in May 2020.
