= Rebecca Washenfelder =

American atmospheric scientist

Rebecca Ann Washenfelder is an American atmospheric scientist whose research has concerned the development of instrumentation to measure the chemical composition of the atmosphere and its pollutants and greenhouse gases. She is executive editor of the journal Atmospheric Measurement Techniques, and an affiliate researcher at the University of Colorado Boulder in the laboratory of Joost de Gouw.

== Education and career ==
Washenfelder was an undergraduate at Pomona College, graduating in 1999 with a bachelor's degree in chemistry. She studied environmental science and engineering at the California Institute of Technology, receiving a master's degree in 2002 and completing her Ph.D. there in 2006. Her dissertation, Column Abundances of Carbon Dioxide and Methane Retrieved from Ground-Based Near-Infrared Solar Spectra, was supervised by Paul Wennberg.

She joined the National Oceanic and Atmospheric Administration (NOAA) as a postdoctoral researcher and National Academies Postdoctoral Fellow in 2006, in its Chemical Sciences Laboratory. She remained at the NOAA as a permanent staff researcher until 2022, when she left to become executive editor of Atmospheric Measurement Techniques. She added a research affiliation with the University of Colorado in 2023.

== Recognition ==
Washenfelder was awarded a Presidential Early Career Award for Scientists and Engineers in 2012.
