= Wyburn =

Wyburn is a surname. Notable people with the surname include:

- George Wyburn (1903–1985), British embryologist
- Nathan Wyburn (born 1989), Welsh artist and media personality
- Rhoda Wyburn (1841–1934), English milliner

== See also ==
- Wyborn
