= Operation IceBridge =

Arctic research project by NASA

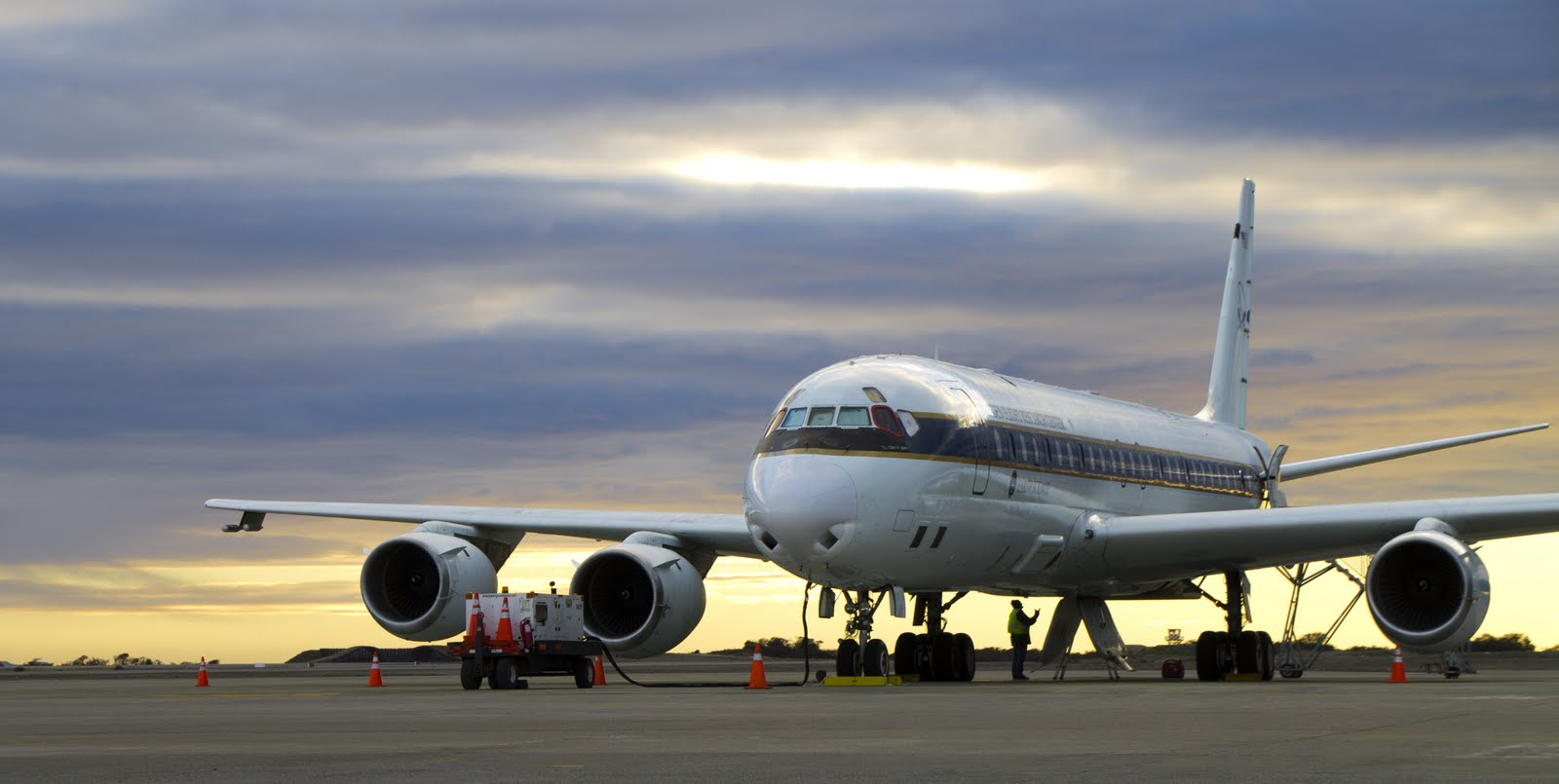
The NASA DC-8 sits on the ramp at Punta Arenas airport, Chile, during pre-flight procedures during the 2012 Antarctic campaign

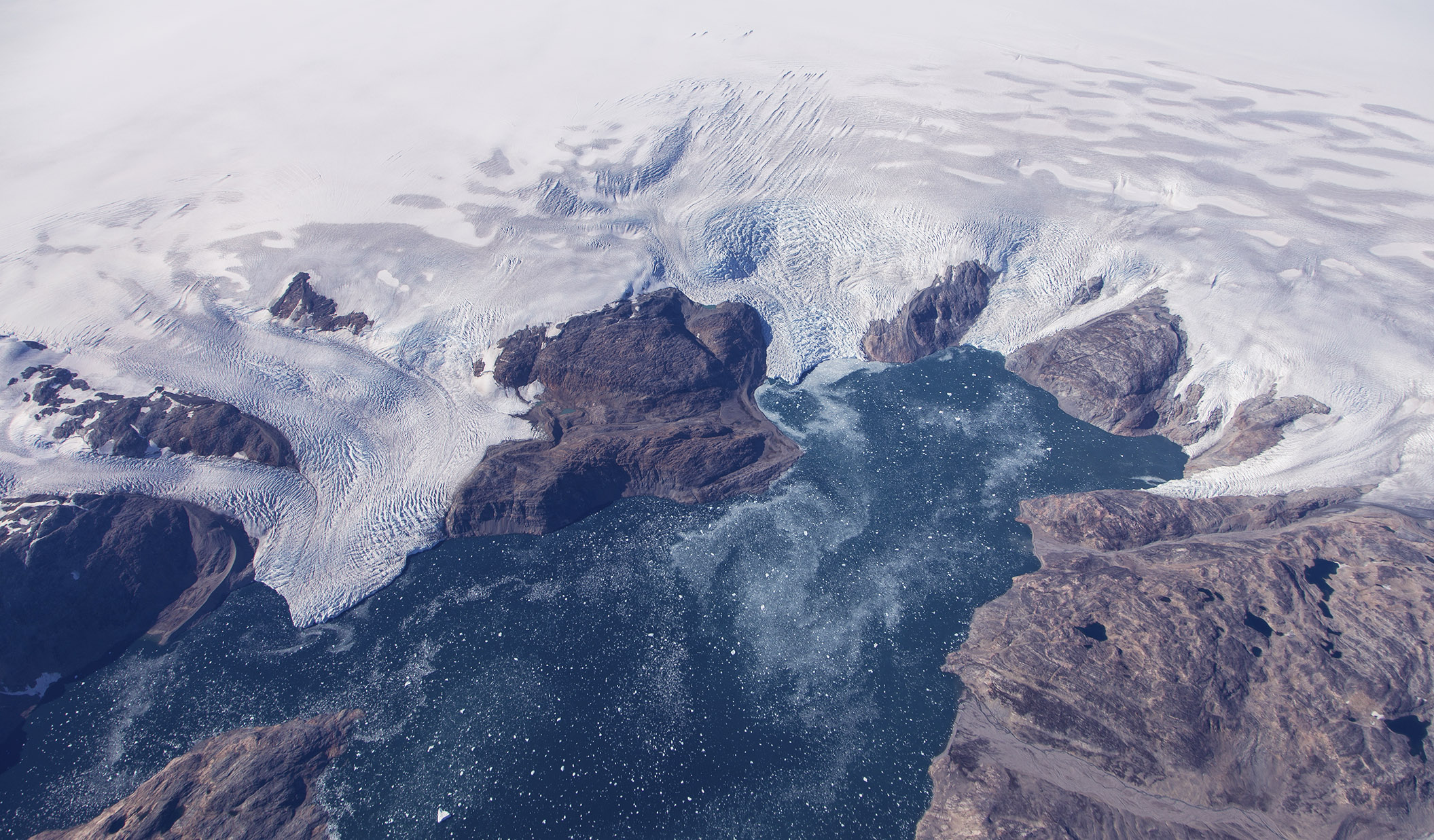
Bruckner and Heim Gletschers pouring into Johan Petersens Fjord in eastern coastal Greenland. Taken from the NASA HU-25C Falcon aircraft, September 2016.

Operation IceBridge (OIB) was a NASA mission to monitor changes in polar ice by utilizing airborne platforms to bridge the observational gap between the ICESat and ICESat-2 satellite missions. The program, which ran from 2009 to 2019, employed various aircraft equipped with advanced instruments to measure ice elevation, thickness, and underlying bedrock topography. The data collected helped scientists understand ice dynamics, contributing to predictive models of ice and sea-level rise. IceBridge played a crucial role in discovering the longest canyon on Earth beneath the Greenland ice sheet.

== Program history ==
From 2003 to 2009, NASA used a space-based laser altimeter, ICESat, for observing polar ice. ICESat was retired in 2009 due to a technical malfunction, leaving NASA without a satellite dedicated to ice observance. A next-generation satellite, ICESat-2, launched in September 2018. In order to maintain annual observations of ice sheets and sea ice, NASA introduced the IceBridge program to "bridge the gap" between satellite missions. The program utilizes aircraft platforms to make airborne measurements of the polar regions.

IceBridge flights began in March 2009, on an Arctic Spring campaign based out of Thule Air Base, Greenland. Southern Hemisphere flights began during the first Austral Spring campaign in October 2009, based out of Punta Arenas, Chile. Flights during field campaigns can contain either dedicated land ice and sea ice flights, or a combination thereof, based upon platform, weather and location constraints. To date there have been Spring campaigns in the Arctic and Antarctic, as well as flights monitoring summer melt on Alaskan glaciers every year since 2009. Additional campaigns have occurred in the Arctic summer and East Antarctica.

== Platforms ==
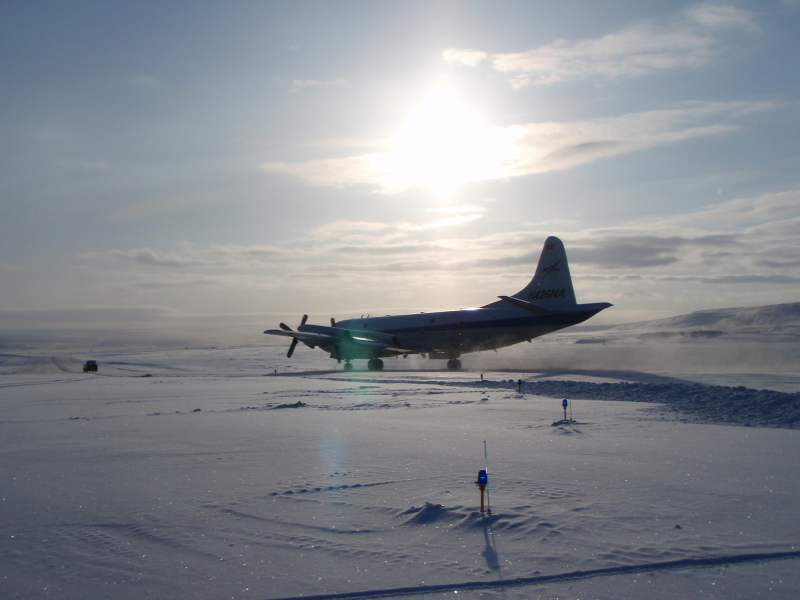
The P-3 Orion aircraft used in Operation IceBridge

IceBridge flights began in March 2009 using a Lockheed P-3 Orion in the Arctic, and were followed later that year by a Douglas DC-8 in the Antarctic. Other aircraft have been used throughout the program, such as a King Air B-200, Gulfstream V and Guardian Falcon.

There are tradeoffs to using an aircraft instead of a satellite. One drawback is that a satellite can observe a far wider area. Also, satellites take measurements full-time, while IceBridge aircraft measurements are limited to annual campaigns that are several weeks long. Aircraft, however, have the advantage of being able to carry more instruments, change or upgrade instruments from campaign to campaign and target scientifically interesting areas instead of following a fixed path. Also, certain instruments such as ice-penetrating radar only work from the lower altitudes afforded by aircraft like the P-3 Orion and DC-8.

== Instruments ==
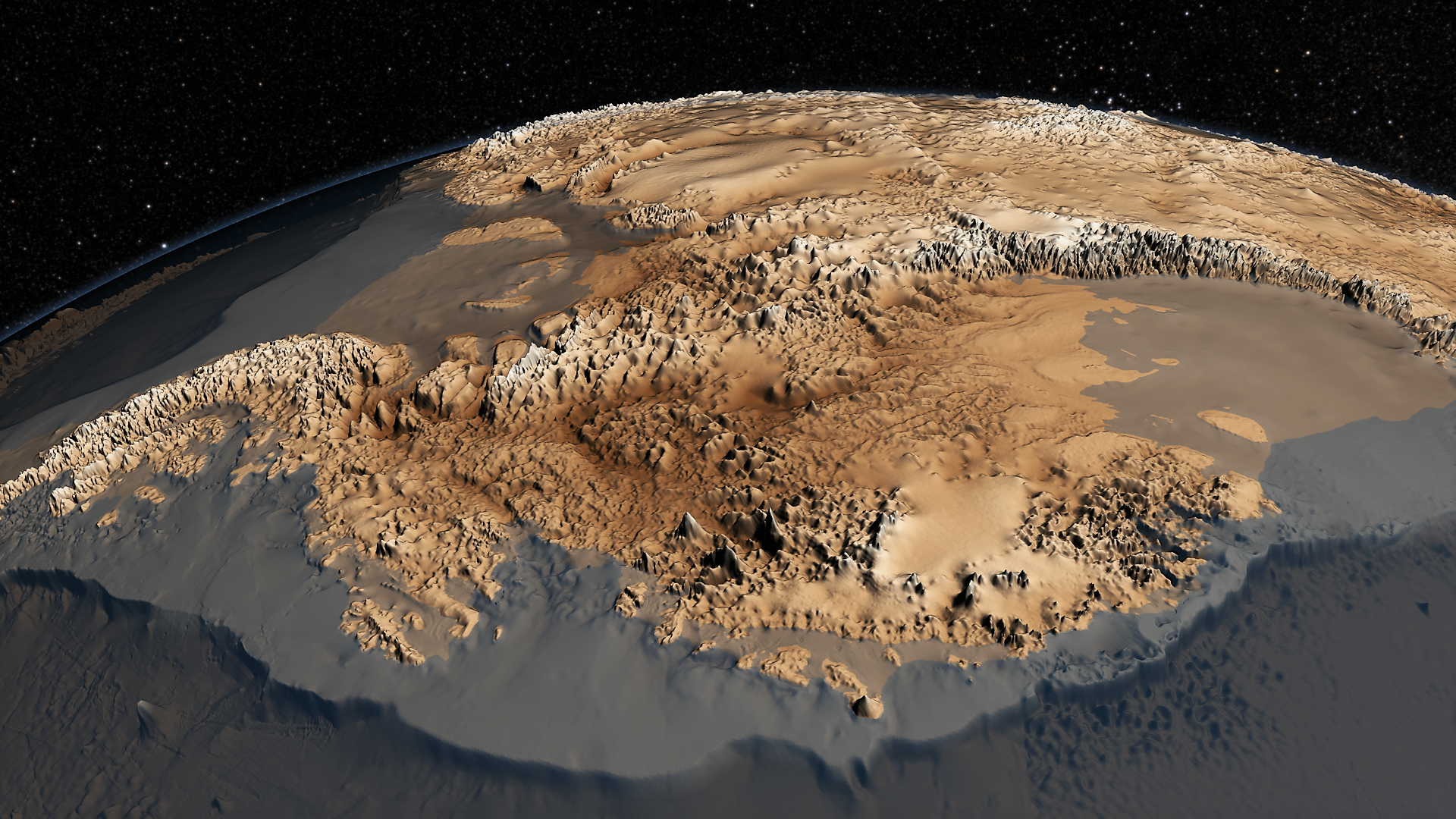
The bedrock topography of Antarctica, critical to understand dynamic motion of the continental ice sheets.

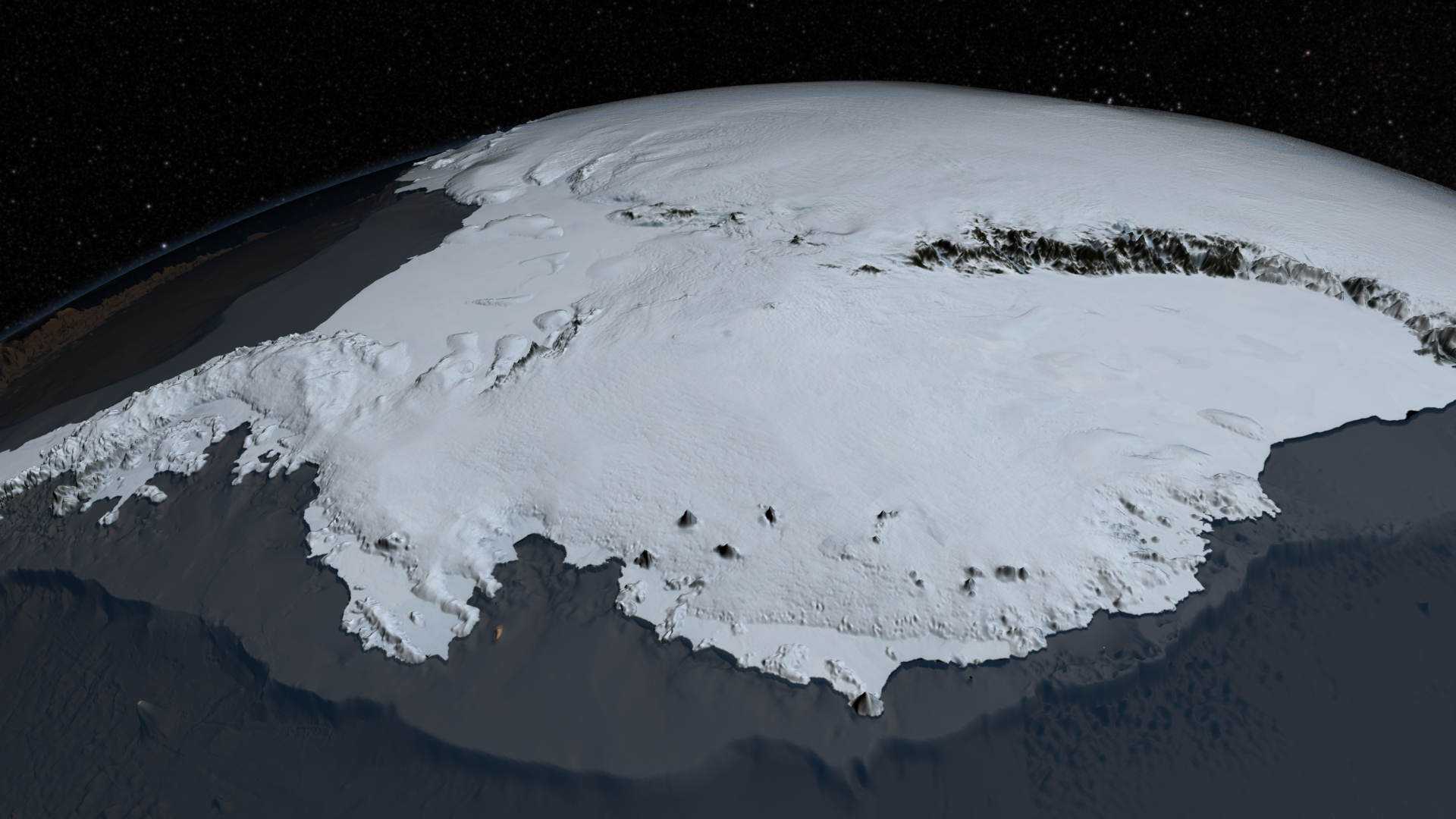
Visualization of NASA's mission Operation IceBridge dataset BEDMAP2, obtained with laser and ice-penetrating radar, collecting surface height, bedrock topography and ice thickness.

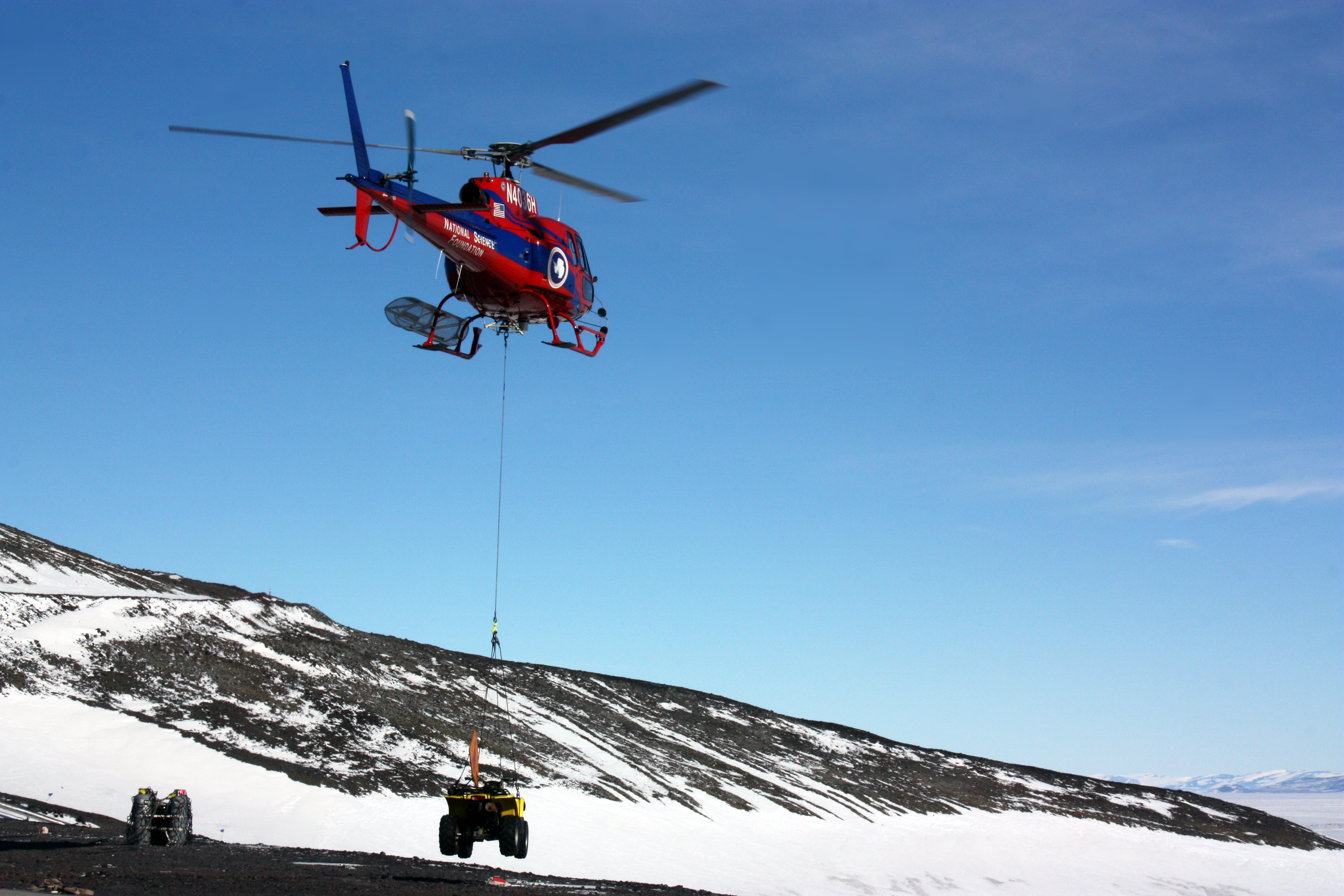
Helicopter takes off from McMurdo Station for Black Island ground survery, 2013

IceBridge aircraft carry a suite of specialized science instruments. Among these is the Airborne Topographic Mapper, a laser that measures the surface elevation of the ice. Also on board is a gravimeter, an instrument capable of measuring the shape of cavities in the ice. There are numerous other pieces of equipment on board, including the Land, Vegetation and Ice Sensor, the Multichannel Coherent Radar Depth Sounder, a Snow Radar, a Ku-Band Radar Altimeter, a magnetometer and the Digital Mapping System.

=== Laser altimeters ===
Airborne Topographic Mapper (ATM) – The Airborne Topographic Mapper (ATM) is a laser altimeter that bounces laser light off the ice surface and measures how long it takes to return. By combining this timing data with information about the aircraft's position and attitude, researchers can calculate ice elevation. By flying over the same areas of ice year after year, they can build a time series of changes in elevation. This instrument works similarly to the lidar instrument used in ICESat and is helping maintain a record of elevation changes until ICESat-2 becomes operational.

Land Vegetation and Ice Sensor (LVIS) - The Land, Vegetation and Ice Sensor (LVIS) is a laser altimeter optimized for operation at higher altitudes. LVIS was created by scientists at the Laser Remote Sensing Laboratory at NASA's Goddard Space Flight Center. LVIS has flown on a wide variety of aircraft such as NASA's P-3, DC-8, B-200 and HU-25C Guardian Falcon and NSF's Gulfstream G-V. By flying at a higher altitude, LVIS can survey larger areas and expands IceBridge's range.

=== Radars ===
Operation IceBridge uses up to four different radar instruments operated by the Center for the Remote Sensing of Ice Sheets (CReSIS) at the University of Kansas. Indiana University provides data management services for CReSIS activities in Operation IceBridge.

Multichannel Coherent Radar Depth Sounder (MCoRDS) - The Multichannel Coherent Radar Depth Sounder (MCoRDS) is used to measure ice thickness and map beneath the ice. This instrument uses multiple channels and a large range of radar frequencies to image internal ice layering and bedrock beneath ice sheets. Information on sub-ice terrain is useful for modeling ice sheets.

Snow Radar - The CReSIS Snow Radar instrument is used to measure the thickness of snow layers on top of land and sea ice. Measuring snow thickness is crucial for estimating sea ice thickness.

Ku-band Radar Altimeter - IceBridge also carries a Ku band radar altimeter, which can penetrate snow layers to measure sea and land ice surface elevation.

Accumulation Radar - The accumulation radar instrument is used to gather high-resolution data on the top part of ice. Looking at the uppermost part of ice allows researchers to map past snow accumulation rates.

=== Mapping instruments ===
Digital Mapping System (DMS) - The Digital Mapping System (DMS), created by researchers at NASA's Ames Research Center, is an airborne digital imaging system that is used to detect openings in sea ice and build high-resolution maps of polar ice. The DMS instrument is a downward-facing digital camera that captures multiple individual frames that are combined into image mosaics using computer software.

Gravimeter - Operation IceBridge also uses a gravity-measuring instrument known as a gravimeter. This instrument measures the strength of gravitational fields beneath the aircraft, which researchers can use to determine the shape of water cavities beneath floating ice shelves. Because water is less dense than rock, areas of floating ice show weaker gravitational fields than areas with rock underneath.

Magnetometer - The NASA P-3 Orion carries a magnetometer that can be used to gather data on the properties of sub-ice rock. Density and magnetic properties can be used to infer bedrock type, which is helpful for determining sub-ice basal conditions.

== Research ==
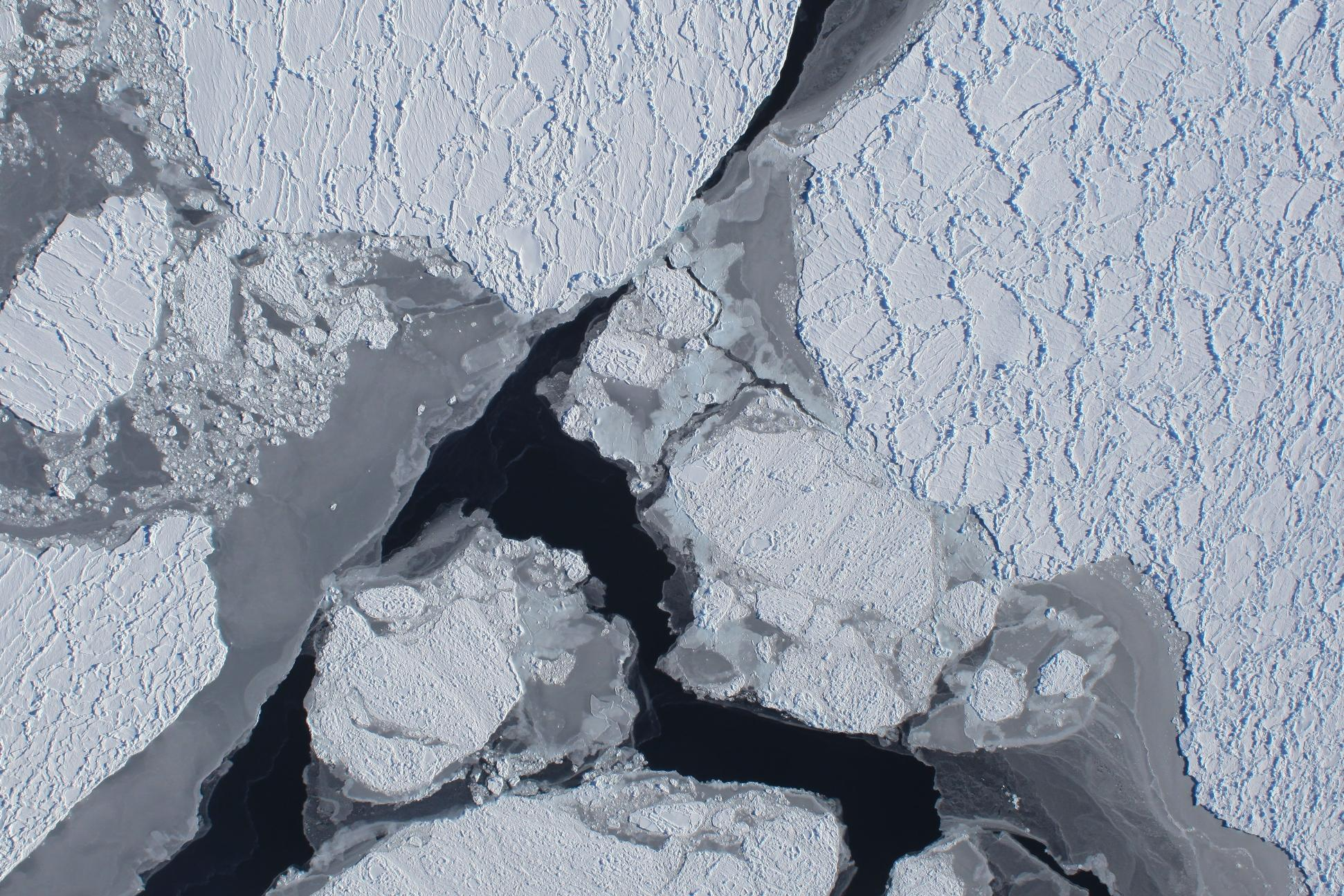
Aerial photo of Pine Island Glacier taken during Operation IceBridge

The project, headed by project scientist Joseph MacGregor, from NASA's Goddard Space Flight Center, uses a suite of airborne science instruments to get a three-dimensional view of Arctic and Antarctic ice. The mission's goals are to monitor changes in polar ice, gather data for predictive models of ice and sea-level rise and bridge the gap in measurements between NASA's ICESat and ICESat-2 satellites. IceBridge achieves this by collecting data over ice sheets, glaciers and sea ice. Pine Island Glacier is one such area of focus. There, Operation IceBridge has been observing the underside of the ice-sheet using an advanced radar, as well as closely monitoring an area of Pine Island Glacier known as the ice tongue that, were it to melt, would allow a large portion of the glacier to slide into the Amundsen Sea.

In August 2013 the discovery of the longest canyon on Earth under the Greenland ice sheet was reported, based on an analysis of data from Operation IceBridge.

== Outreach and collaborations ==
For the second straight year, NASA's Operation IceBridge is collaborating with the European Space Agency's CryoVEx program, flying aircraft low over Arctic sea ice while ESA's CryoSat satellite orbits above. In this video, IceBridge Project Scientist Michael Studinger discusses the benefits of the long term joint data set the agencies are creating.

In 2012, five teachers were invited on board NASA's P-3B aircraft to fly at 500 metres (1,600 ft) above the glaciers of Greenland with Operation IceBridge.
