= Grand Canyon (Greenland) =

Large subglacial canyon in Greenland

Coordinates: 79.0000°N 46.0000°W

Animation of the canyon

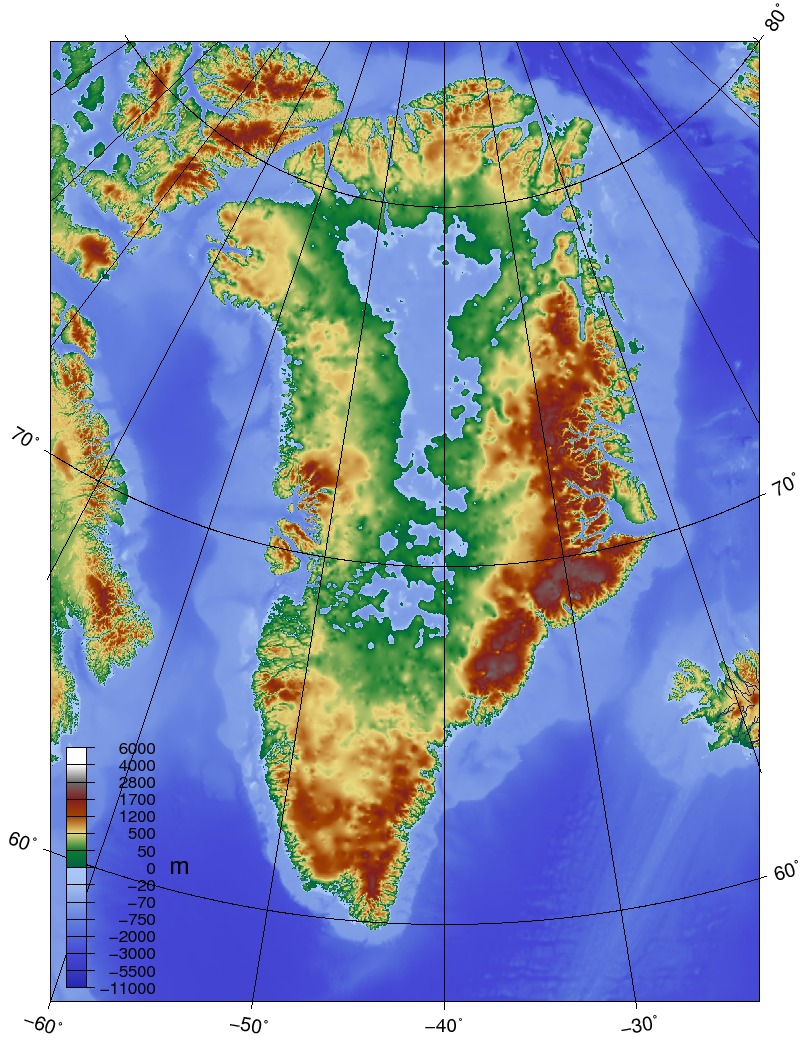
Topographic map of the bedrock under the ice

The Grand Canyon of Greenland is a tentative canyon of record length discovered underneath the Greenland ice sheet as reported in the journal Science on 30 August 2013 (submitted 29 April 2013), by scientists from the University of Bristol led by Jonathan Bamber, University of Calgary, and University of Urbino, who described it as a mega-canyon.

Ice-penetrating radar data collected during NASA's Operation IceBridge showed a huge subglacial canyon running from the central region of the island northward into the Arctic Ocean, to the fjord of the Petermann Glacier. The bottom of the canyon is below sea level; the canyon is likely to have influenced basal water flow from the ice sheet interior to the margin. Jonathan Bamber, a geographer at University of Bristol, stated, "The distinctive V-shaped walls and flat bottom suggests water carved the buried valley, not ice."

The canyon is more than 750 kilometres (466 mi) long, up to 800 metres (2,600 ft) deep and 10 kilometres (6 mi) wide, making it the longest canyon discovered on the Earth to date. There are, however, many canyons—including Arizona's Grand Canyon (1,857 meters) and Tibet's Yarlung Tsangpo Grand Canyon (overall 2,268 meters), previously the world's longest—that are deeper.

The canyon predates ice sheet inception and has influenced basal hydrology in Greenland over past glacial cycles.
