= Pattern Recognition in Physics =

- Discipline: Physics
- Language: English
- Edited by: Sid-Ali Ouadfeul

Publication details
- History: 2013-2014
- Publisher: Copernicus Publications
- Open access: Yes

Standard abbreviations
- ISO 4: Pattern Recognit. Phys.

Indexing
- ISSN: 2195-9250
- OCLC no.: 858879687

Pattern Recognition in Physics was an open-access journal originally published by Copernicus Publications which was established in March 2013 and terminated in January 2014. The editors-in-chief were Sid-Ali Ouadfeul (Algerian Petroleum Institute) and Nils-Axel Mörner. Copernicus ceased its publication due to concerns over the publication's method of peer review, which it calls "nepotistic reviewing and malpractice" facilitating views contradicting the scientific consensus on climate change.

== History ==
Copernicus agreed to publish the journal because the editors claimed that its aim would be "to publish articles about patterns recognized in the full spectrum of physical disciplines rather than to focus on climate-research-related topics." Concerns regarding the journal's peer-review process were first raised in July 2013 by Jeffrey Beall, an American librarian and critic of predatory open access publishing. Beall wrote on his blog that Mörner did not appear to be a specialist in pattern recognition and that Ouadfeul's research had "only been cited a couple times." He also noted that two of the journal's first five articles were authored by Ouadfeul himself, and concluded that "This is not a good start for a journal, and the publisher ought to be concerned and take action."

After a special issue of the journal was published in December 2013, which contained a paper in which the authors said they "doubt the continued, even accelerated, warming as claimed by the IPCC project," Copernicus managing director Martin Rasmussen expressed concern regarding this journal. He also said that "the editors selected the referees on a nepotistic basis, which we regard as malpractice in scientific publishing." On January 17, 2014, Copernicus Publications announced that they were terminating the journal, citing both the statement that questioned the IPCC's prediction of continued global warming and the "nepotistic" appointing of similarly minded scientists to the journal's editorial board.
