= Helen Glaves =

Data scientist

Helen M. Glaves
- Awards: European Geosciences Union Ian McHarg medal
- Scientific career
- Institutions: British Geological Survey

Helen Glaves is the Senior Data Scientist at the British Geological Survey. She serves as Editor for the American Geophysical Union Earth and Space Science journal and was awarded the European Geosciences Union Ian McHarg medal in 2016. Glaves served as the President of the European Geosciences Union from 2021 to 2023.

== Early life and education ==
Glaves earned bachelor's degrees in geology and information technology. Her early research focussed on database design.

== Research and career ==
Glaves has contributed to novel ways to store and share marine research data. She is the programme manager of the Research Data Alliance, which she has been involved with since its inception. Glaves co-ordinates the Ocean Data Interoperability Platform (ODIP), which looks to share ocean data across scientific domains and international borders. She led the expansion of ODIP (ODIP-II) that supported transferring data in different formats between research centres. ODIP-II makes use of the Natural Environment Research Council (NERC) vocabulary server to transfer between different data formats. The vocabulary server was developed by the British Oceanographic Data Centre and National Oceanography Centre.

In 2016 Glaves was awarded the European Geosciences Union (EGU) Ian McHarg medal. She served as the President of the EGU Earth and Space Science Informatics section for three years, from 2017 to 2020, and was elected the President of the European Geosciences Union from 2021 to 2023. She is an Editor of the American Geophysical Union journal Earth and Space Science.

In 2022, Glaves was keynote speaker at the 17th annual International Digital Curation Conference. She currently leads activities on the inter-operability of data and services within the European Plate Observing System (EPOS).
