= Günter Blöschl =

Austrian hydrologist, engineer and academic

Professor Günter Blöschl
- Born: July 11, 1961 (age 65)
- Education: Vienna University of Technology
- Occupation: Academic at Vienna University of Technology
- Awards: Stockholm Water Prize (2025)
- Website: Official website

Professor Günter Blöschl (born 11 July 1961) is an Austrian hydrologist, engineer and academic.

In 2020, Blöschl was elected as a member of the US National Academy of Engineering for international leadership in the prediction and management of extreme hydrological events.

== Education ==
Günter Blöschl holds a Diploma (Dipl.-Ing.) in Civil Engineering (1985), a Ph.D. in Hydrology (1990), and a Senior Doctorate (Habilitation) in Hydrology (1997), all from the Vienna University of Technology.

== Career and research ==
Blöschl was an assistant professor (1985–1992, 1994–1997) at the Vienna University of Technology. During that time, he was a research fellow at the University of British Columbia, Vancouver (1989), a visiting fellow at the University of Melbourne (1992–1993, 1997), and a research fellow at the Australian National University, Canberra (1992–1994). In 1997, he was appointed associate professor of Hydrology and in 2007 full professor and chair of Hydrology and Water Resources Management at the Vienna University of Technology. Since 2012 he has been the Head of the Institute of Hydraulic Engineering and Water Resources Management at Vienna University of Technology. In 2014 he was appointed advisory professor at Hohai University, Nanjing, and a distinguished visiting professor at Tsinghua University, Beijing in 2017.

Blöschl chairs the Scientific Advisory Council of the German Federal Institute of Hydrology (BfG) and has been chair of the Predictions in Ungauged Basins (PUB) initiative of the International Association Hydrological Sciences whose Synthesis book he has edited. From 2013 to 2015 he was president of the European Geosciences Union. For 2017-2021 he is the president of the International Association of Hydrological Sciences. He was editor of the American Geophysical Union’s journal Water Resources Research. He has been a member of the Progetto Firenze 2016 International Advisory Board that provided strategic advice on flood-proofing for the city of Florence after the devastating 1966 flood.

His main research interests are in hydrology and water resource management and in particular understanding and predicting floods. An ERC Advanced Grant on ‘Deciphering River Flood Change’ was awarded to him. Using this grant, he demonstrated the role of climate change in increasing flood risk at the European scale which he published in Science Magazine 2017 and in Nature 2019. He is currently leading the HORA 3.0 project where flood risk is mapped for 30,000 km (19,000 mi) of Austrian streams. As the director of the Vienna Doctoral Programme on Water Resource Systems, which is funded by the Austrian Science Fund, Blöschl is coordinating interdisciplinary water research. He is also directing the Hydrology Open Air Laboratory (HOAL) where detailed field observations are performed to understand water and matter fluxes in the landscape.

Throughout his career, Günter Blöschl has been a strong advocate of bridging the gap between understanding fundamental processes and the practice of water resources management. He has published about 300 peer-reviewed papers and several books.

== Awards and honours ==
Blöschl is an international member of the Academy of Sciences of the Institute of Bologna (2017) and the National Academy of Engineering (2020).

He received the Robert E. Horton Medal from the American Geophysical Union (AGU) in 2015, became a Corresponding Member of the Austrian Academy of Sciences (ÖAW) in 2014, received the Helmholtz International Fellow Award of the Helmholtz Association, Germany in 2014, and the International Hydrology Prize from the IAHS in 2013. He was named Boussinesq Lecturer of the Royal Academy of Sciences, the Netherlands in 2013. He also is an ERC Advanced Grant Laureate, and was named Leonardo Lecturer: EGU in 2011. He received the Creativity Prize of the Prince Sultan Bin Abdulaziz International Prize for Water in 2018 and the John Dalton Medal from the European Geophysical Union in 2019.

Blöschl is a member of the German Academy of Science and Engineering (Acatech) (2010), and has been a fellow of the American Geophysical Union (AGU) since 2006, and the International Water Academy, Norway, since 2003.
