= Charlotte Krawczyk =

German geophysicist

Charlotte M. Krawczyk is a German geophysicist whose research involves the development of methods for seismic imaging and its application for understanding the structure of the Earth's crust, initially focusing on subduction zones and later shifting her interests to the continental crust. She is head of the section on near-surface geophysics of the GFZ Helmholtz Centre for Geosciences in Potsdam, and a professor of geophysics at Technische Universität Berlin.

== Education and career ==
Krawczyk was a student of oceanography and physics at Kiel University, where she received a vordiplom in 1986, a diploma in 1991, abd a Ph.D. in 1995.

Afte postdoctoral research at GFZ, she became a research group leader at GFZ in 1997. She was named as a senior scientist at GFZ in 2002. From 2007 to 2015 she worked at the LIAG Institute for Applied Geophysics in Hanover, initially as head of the section on seismics, gravimetry, and magnetics, and later as vice director. In 2016 she returned to GFZ as section head, also taking a joint appointment as a professor at TU Berlin.

She is the chief executive editor of the journal Solid Earth.

== Recognition ==
Krawczyk was elected to acatech, the German Academy of Science and Engineering, in 2016, and to the Academia Europaea in 2018.
