= Laurie Menviel =

Climate modeller

- Occupation: Associate Professor
- Known for: Climate modelling & paleoclimate
- Scientific career
- Workplaces: University of New South Wales

Laurie Menviel or L. Menviel; Laurie Menviel is a palaeoclimatologist, and a Scientia fellow, at the University of New South Wales, who was awarded a Dorothy Hill Medal in 2019.

== Career and education ==
Menviel was awarded a Masters of Geochemistry at the University of Aix-Marseille, France, in 2002, and then a PhD in Chemical Oceanography at the University of Hawaiʻi, in 2008.

Menviel's research includes studies on ocean circulation, the carbon cycle and paleoceanography. She has published on ocean circulation, the variability of ocean circulation and the impact of this variability on planetary climate, carbon cycles, and the cryosphere. Menviel has published on earth science, including the role of ocean circulation on both the future and past climate changes, particularly abrupt changes. She has also worked on evaluating the impact of changes in the circulation of the ocean, and how this influences the carbon cycle, as well as the Antarctic ice sheet's stability and variability.

Menviel is the editor and co-editor in chief of the journal Climate of the Past. She was awarded an Australian Research Council, DECRA award, and is a researcher at the Climate Change Research Centre, at the University of New South Wales.

== Publications ==
Select publications include the following.

- Yu, J.; Menviel, L.; Jin, Z. D.; Anderson, R. F.; Jian, Z.; Piotrowski, A. M.; Ma, X.; Rohling, E. J.; Zhang, F.; Marino, G.; McManus, J. F. (2020). "Last glacial atmospheric CO2 decline due to widespread Pacific deep-water expansion". Nature Geoscience. 13 (9): 628–633. Bibcode:2020NatGe..13..628Y. doi:10.1038/s41561-020-0610-5. hdl:11093/6303. ISSN 1752-0908. S2CID 220656993.
- Menviel, Laurie C.; Skinner, Luke C.; Tarasov, Lev; Tzedakis, Polychronis C. (2020). "An ice–climate oscillatory framework for Dansgaard–Oeschger cycles". Nature Reviews Earth & Environment. 1 (12): 677–693. Bibcode:2020NRvEE...1..677M. doi:10.1038/s43017-020-00106-y. hdl:1959.4/unsworks_79034. ISSN 2662-138X. S2CID 226231686.
- Yu, J.; Menviel, L.; Jin, Z. D.; Thornalley, D. J. R.; Foster, G. L.; Rohling, E. J.; McCave, I. N.; McManus, J. F.; Dai, Y.; Ren, H.; He, F. (15 May 2019). "More efficient North Atlantic carbon pump during the Last Glacial Maximum". Nature Communications. 10 (1): 2170. Bibcode:2019NatCo..10.2170Y. doi:10.1038/s41467-019-10028-z. ISSN 2041-1723. PMC 6520411. PMID 31092826.
- Menviel, Laurie (8 March 2019). "The southern amplifier". Science. 363 (6431): 1040–1041. Bibcode:2019Sci...363.1040M. doi:10.1126/science.aaw7196. ISSN 0036-8075. PMID 30846585. S2CID 72336087.
- Menviel, L.; Spence, P.; Yu, J.; Chamberlain, M. A.; Matear, R. J.; Meissner, K. J.; England, M. H. (27 June 2018). "Southern Hemisphere westerlies as a driver of the early deglacial atmospheric CO2 rise". Nature Communications. 9 (1): 2503. Bibcode:2018NatCo...9.2503M. doi:10.1038/s41467-018-04876-4. ISSN 2041-1723. PMC 6021399. PMID 29950652.

== Media ==
Menviel's work on climate and the ocean, including research published in Nature Communications, has been reported in various media sources including describing what 'carbon pollution' is, in The Conversation. Her work has described the impact of climate change on westerly winds in the Southern Ocean. She commented,

"...it is vital to bring more observational networks into the Southern Ocean to monitor these changes. We need a clear warning if we are approaching a point in our climate system where we may see a spike in atmospheric carbon dioxide and the rapid temperature rise that inevitably follows."

== Recognition ==
- 2019 – Dorothy Hill Medal from Australian Academy of Science.
