= Atmospheric Chemistry and Physics =

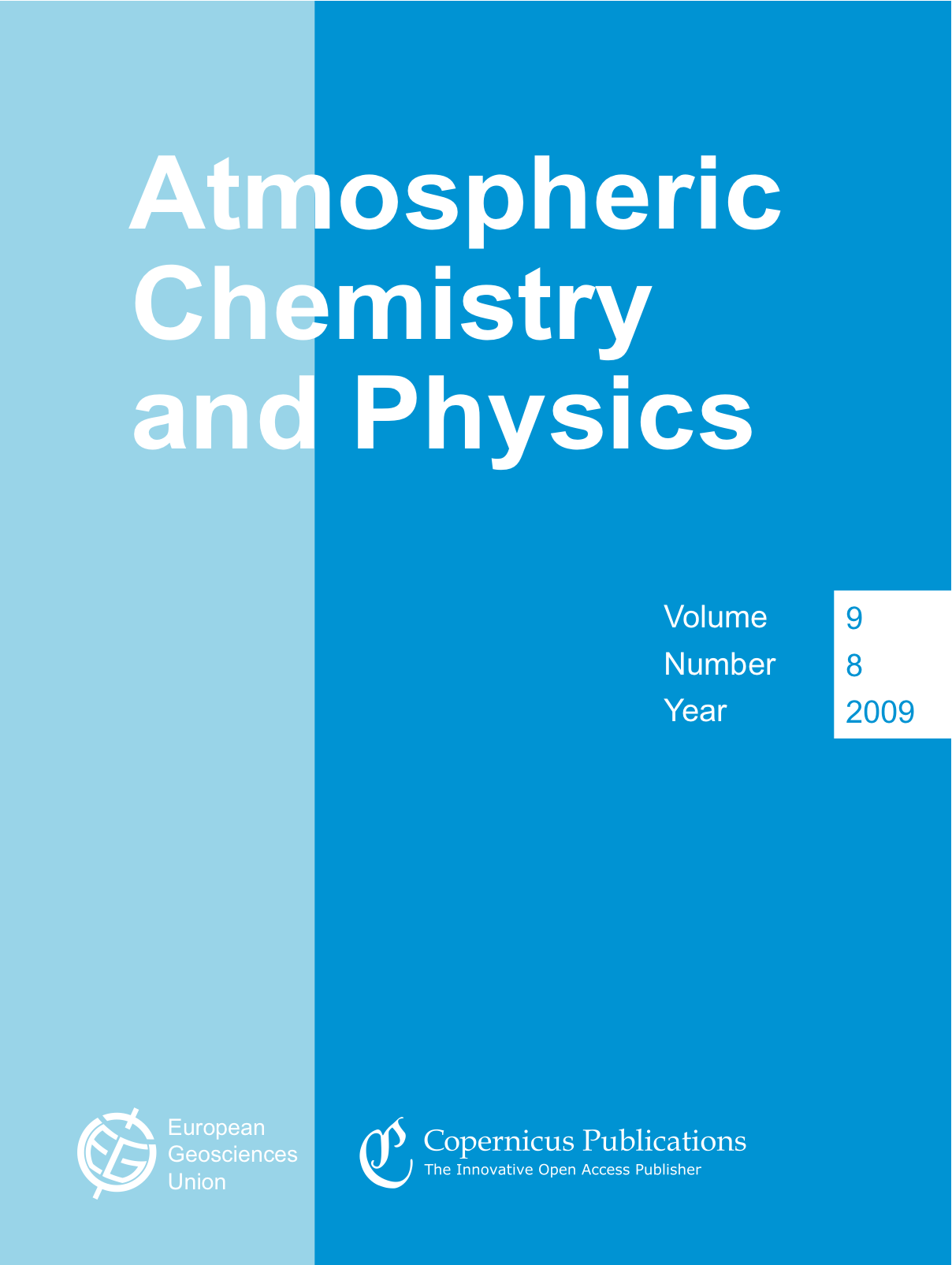
- Discipline: Geosciences
- Language: English
- Edited by: Ken Carslaw & Barbara Ervens

Publication details
- History: 2001-present
- Publisher: Copernicus Publications for the European Geosciences Union (Germany)
- Open access: Yes
- License: Creative Commons Attribution License
- Impact factor: 6.300 (2022)

Standard abbreviations
- ISO 4: Atmos. Chem. Phys.

Indexing
- ISSN: 1680-7316 (print); 1680-7324 (web)
- LCCN: 2004206210
- OCLC no.: 57509369
- Atmospheric Chemistry and Physics Discussions
- ISSN: 1680-7367 (print); 1680-7375 (web)

Links
- Journal homepage

Atmospheric Chemistry and Physics (ACP) is a gold open access, open peer-reviewed scientific journal. The journal scope is research aiming to understand the state and behaviour of the atmosphere and climate. ACP was pioneer of open peer review. The journal is published by Copernicus Publications on behalf of the European Geosciences Union (EGU)

== History ==
ACP was founded in 2001 by the publisher, Copernicus Publications, on behalf of the non-profit institution, European Geosciences Union. It is an early example of open access publishing, founded prior to the 2003 Berlin Declaration on Open Access to Knowledge in the Sciences and Humanities. The journal was a pioneer of open peer review. It was the first Copernicus and EGU journal, and among the first of all journals, to publicly publish and permanently archive reviews. Variants of the open review approach have since been taken up by other major journals.

== Publication focus, form and process ==
The journal covers research on the Earth's atmosphere and the underlying chemical and physical processes, including the altitude range from the land and ocean surface up to the turbopause, including the troposphere, stratosphere, and mesosphere. The main subject areas comprise atmospheric modelling, field measurements, remote sensing, and laboratory studies of gases, aerosols, clouds and precipitation, isotopes, radiation, dynamics, and biosphere and hydrosphere interactions.

Article types published are research and review articles, letters, opinions, measurement reports, technical notes, perspectives and commentaries.

The journal has a two-stage publication process. In the first stage, papers that pass a rapid access peer-review are immediately published on the Atmospheric Chemistry and Physics Discussions forum website. They are then subject to interactive public peer review, including the referees' comments (anonymous or attributed), additional comments by other members of the scientific community (attributed), and the authors' replies. In the second stage, if accepted, the final revised papers are published in the journal. To ensure publication precedence for authors, and to provide a lasting record of the scientific discussion, both the journal and the forum are permanently archived and fully citable.

== Abstracting and indexing ==
This journal is abstracted and indexed by:

- Web of Science/Science Citation Index
- Current Contents
- Scopus
- Astrophysics Data System
- Chemical Abstracts
- GeoRef

== See also ==
- Atmospheric chemistry
