= Paul Wennberg =

- Education: Oberlin College, Harvard University
- Known for: atmospheric science, carbon cycle
- Spouse: Cheryl Margaret Wold
- Awards: MacArthur Fellow
- Scientific career
- Fields: atmospheric scientist
- Workplaces: California Institute of Technology
- Doctoral advisor: James G. Anderson
- Doctoral students: Rebecca Washenfelder
- Website: www.gps.caltech.edu/content/paul-o-wennberg

Paul O. Wennberg is the R. Stanton Avery Professor of Atmospheric Chemistry and Environmental Science and Engineering at the California Institute of Technology (Caltech). Until 2023, he was the director of the Ronald and Maxine Linde Center for Global Environmental Science. He served as the first chair of the Total Carbon Column Observing Network and a founding member of the Orbiting Carbon Observatory project, which created NASA's first spacecraft for analysis of carbon dioxide in the atmosphere. He was previously the principal investigator for the Mars Atmospheric Trace Molecule Occultation Spectrometer (MATMOS) to investigate trace gases in Mars's atmosphere.

Wennberg's research focuses on the atmospheric chemistry of planets, including air quality, photochemistry, and the carbon cycle. He designs and builds remote-sensing and in-situ scientific instruments which are used in field investigations supported by the National Science Foundation and NASA. His scientific instruments have made it possible to measure radicals in the atmosphere at concentrations that could not previously be detected. He measures atmospheric trace gases, making it possible to accurately describe the exchange of carbon dioxide and other gases between the atmosphere and the land and ocean. His research has substantially advanced understanding of the atmospheric chemistry of the troposphere and the stratosphere.

== Education ==
Paul Wennberg grew up in Waterbury Center, Vermont. He received a B.A. from Oberlin College in 1985, and a Ph.D. from Harvard University in 1994. At Harvard, he worked with James G. Anderson, professor of atmospheric chemistry. His doctoral thesis was In Situ Measurements of Stratospheric Hydroxyl and Hydroperoxyl Radicals.

== Career ==
Wennberg joined Caltech in 1998. He was an associate professor of atmospheric chemistry and environmental engineering science from 1998 to 2001, becoming a full professor in 2001. In 2004, he was appointed as the R. Stanton Avery Professor of Atmospheric Chemistry and Environmental Science and Engineering. Wennberg has been associated with the Ronald and Maxine Linde Center for Global Environmental Science at Caltech since it was established in 2008. He served as the director from 2008 to 2011, acting director from 2012 to 2014 and director from 2014 onwards.

== Research ==
While still at Harvard, Wennberg developed advanced airborne sensors to measure radicals in the atmosphere, in particular the odd-hydrogen radicals OH and HO_{2}. The laser-induced fluorescence instrument that he developed was placed in the nose of a NASA ER-2 aircraft to measure radicals during flight. It has been used to measure radicals in both the troposphere and the stratosphere.

Wennberg's sensor was used in several NASA missions, beginning with the SPADE mission in 1993. SPADE obtained the first simultaneous in situ measurements of OH, HO_{2}, NO, NO_{2}, ClO, and BrO from the lower stratosphere. The data were used to calculate ozone loss rates and showed that HO_{x} dominated stratospheric ozone loss, a result that had not been previously observable. NASA's ASHOE/MAESA mission (1994) took measurements of HO_{x} from latitudes of -70°S to 70°N, reaching nearly from the south pole to the north pole. The STRAT mission (1995–1996) was the first to record measurements of HO_{x} in the upper troposphere, and demonstrated that the concentration of HO_{x} considerably exceeded expected levels. The POLARIS mission in 1997 obtained measurements all the way to 90° N latitude, the North pole. As of 2004, Wennberg's instrument was modified for in situ measurements of water vapour and its Isotopologue HDO, and became the basis of the Harvard "Hoxotope".

Using these tools, he overturned the long-held belief that lower stratospheric ozone is destroyed principally by nitrogen oxides; Wennberg showed that odd-hydrogen catalysis represents a quantitatively more important process. By contrast to the stratosphere, a significant fraction of tropospheric ozone results from the presence of nitric oxide delivered to the atmosphere by aircraft and surface hydrocarbon burning. Ozone in the stratosphere acts as a protective shield against ultraviolet radiation, but ozone in the troposphere significantly reduces air quality. By developing methods for measuring radical gases in situ and interpreting these results within a theoretical framework, Wennberg has advanced our understanding of atmospheric chemistry.

Since his move to Caltech, Wennberg has been deeply involved in two inter-related long-term instrumentation and data-collection projects: the Orbiting Carbon Observatory, and its ground-based counterpart, the Total Carbon Column Observing Network. Goals include better understanding of the carbon cycle, validation of data from space-based instruments, and establishing a standard for ground-based in situ networked data collection.

In 2002, Wennberg was elected chair of the Total Carbon Column Observing Network (TCCON). In 2004, the first TCCON site was established. The Total Carbon Column Observing Network is a group of about 20 ground-based sites worldwide that host Fourier transform spectrometers. The spectrometers examine near-infrared (NIR) solar absorption spectra and measure atmospheric column abundances of CO_{2}, CH_{4}, CO, N_{2}O and other molecules in terrestrial ecosystems. Data enables researchers to identify and study local carbon "sources" and "sinks", and by pooling data across the system, to better understand mechanisms of carbon exchange involving the atmosphere, the land, and the ocean. Data from the sites is used to understand carbon dynamics and to validate data from space-based measurements of atmospheric CO_{2} and CH_{4}. Both terrestrial and atmospheric data are used to study carbon transfer within the atmosphere. Methane emissions from the Aliso Canyon gas leak were detected by TCCON within a day of the start of the leak. "TCCON has pioneered a key element of the ground segment measurements required to provide the evidence base for policy making for the next 100 years."

Wennberg is a founding member of the Orbiting Carbon Observatory and its successor, the Orbiting Carbon Observatory-2. The first satellite failed to separate from the Orbital Taurus XL rocket used as its launch vehicle on February 24, 2009, and was destroyed during reentry. The second satellite, a near duplicate, was launched successfully by NASA on July 2, 2014, using a ULA Delta II 7320-10C rocket. Spectrometers on the satellite can map the distribution of CO_{2} particles across the planet by measuring the average amount of CO_{2} above specific locations.

Wennberg was the principal investigator for the development of the Mars Atmospheric Trace Molecule Occultation Spectrometer (MATMOS), a collaboration between Caltech and the Canadian Space Agency with NASA support. MATMOS was to have been flown on the ExoMars Trace Gas Orbiter and take spectra of the sunlight through Mars' atmosphere as the spacecraft goes through its orbital sunrise and sunset but the US contribution to the mission was cancelled.

== Awards and honors ==
Wennberg received a Presidential Early Career Award for Scientists and Engineers (PECASE) in 1999 from President Bill Clinton. He was named a MacArthur Foundation Fellow in 2002. Wennberg is a member of the US National Academy of Sciences and a Fellow of the American Geophysical Union and the American Academy of Arts and Sciences.
