= Helen Bamber =

British psychotherapist and human rights activist (1925–2014)

- Born: Helen Balmuth; 1 May 1925; London, England
- Died: 21 August 2014 (aged 89); London, England
- Resting place: Highgate Cemetery
- Other name: Helen Rae Bamber
- Education: London School of Economics
- Occupations: Psychotherapist and human rights activist
- Known for: Work with survivors of human rights violations
- Notable work: The Helen Bamber Foundation

Helen Rae Bamber OBE, née Helen Balmuth (1 May 1925 – 21 August 2014), was a British psychotherapist and human rights activist. She worked with Holocaust survivors in Germany after the concentration camps were liberated in 1945. In 1947, she returned to Britain and continued her work, helping to establish Amnesty International and later co-founding the Medical Foundation for the Care of Victims of Torture. In 2005, she created the Helen Bamber Foundation to help survivors of human rights violations.

Throughout her life, Bamber worked with those who were the most marginalised: Holocaust survivors, asylum-seekers, refugees, victims of the conflict in Northern Ireland, trafficked men, women and children, survivors of genocide, torture, rape, female genital mutilation, British former Far East prisoners of war, former hostages and other people who suffered torture abroad. She worked in many countries, including Gaza, Kosovo, Uganda, Turkey and Northern Ireland.

== Family and early life ==
Bamber's father, Louis Balmuth, was born in New York. His family returned to Poland, at a time of Jewish pogroms and moved again to England in 1895 when Balmuth was nine. He was in his late 30s when he married Marie Bader, who had been born in Britain of Polish extraction. Their daughter Helen Balmuth (later, Bamber) was born in 1925, and grew up in Amhurst Park, a Jewish area of North-East London. Louis Balmuth worked as an accountant during the day and as a philosopher, writer and mathematician outside office hours. His wife Marie was a singer and pianist who hoped that their daughter would become a celebrated performer. When Louis's younger brother Michael, who had been financially successful and with whom the entire Balmuth family, including Louis and Michael's parents, lived in Michael's large house, fell on hard financial times, Bamber and her parents moved to a smaller home in nearby Stamford Hill. Bamber was moved from a private Jewish school in London to a multi-denominational primary, from where she won a scholarship to high school in Tottenham. She had spent much time sick as a child and may well have suffered from tuberculosis.

Bamber's grandfather had been a politico who had followed the ideas of Peter Kropotkin and her father's strong beliefs in human rights pervaded the radical household. The family felt the Nazi threat strongly, and during the 1930s, her father, who spoke fluent German, followed Radio Berlin broadcasts in order to track the unfolding political situation. He read out sections of Mein Kampf to the family to underline the issues at stake, and Bamber describes a sense of constant foreboding in her home. As a teenager in the late 1930s, Bamber joined a group of protesters opposing Oswald Mosley's British Union of Fascists. During World War II, Bamber was evacuated to Suffolk. Her mother's cousins, Chaim and Menachem, were prominent leaders within Hashomer Hatzair, and urged Bamber's parents to send her to live on a Palestinian kibbutz. Menachem Bader was later involved in the 1944 "blood for goods" negotiations with the SS in an attempt to save Hungarian Jews.

== Career ==
=== Belsen ===
Towards the end of the war, Bamber took a job as secretary to a Harley Street doctor, responding to an ad calling for volunteers to help Jewish survivors of the Nazi concentration camps. At the age of 20, she was appointed to one of the first rehabilitation teams to enter the Bergen-Belsen concentration camp with the Jewish Relief Unit to help with the physical and psychological recovery of many of that camp's 20,000 Holocaust survivors. She said: "My father accepted it, almost with a shrug of resignation. I think it was something about repaying a debt. I was aware that if the Nazis had succeeded in invading England, we would have been the victims." Henry Lunzer, her manager in the Jewish Relief Unit, remembers her as a vivacious girl and a natural organiser. "Helen just took charge of [London] headquarters, administered the whole thing," says Lunzer. "It was amazing at that age. God only knows what made her so efficient!"

She related her experience at Belsen to the BBC in 2002: "I didn't go at the very beginning – I wasn't there at its liberation which was quite horrific and which we know well from our screens and from testimonies. I went there some months later after camp one, which we saw on the screens, had been burnt down. It had been burnt because of typhus and raging disease. [...] By the time I got there, there were mounds – people had been buried in great numbers in ditches. But the survivors, the displaced persons, as they then became called, were herded into what had been the German Panzer Division's barracks. These were stone, very dour, very dark and cold buildings in which people lived many to a room without any facilities. She recounted: "[I saw ] awful sights, amputees, gangrene, festering sores. People still looked terribly emaciated [...] sometimes when you were searching through things you were reminded of the enormity of it: once we came across a vast pile of shoes, sorted according to sizes, including children's, all neatly lined up; you were never safe from that kind of confrontation. She said that survivors "would dig their fingers into your arms and hold on to you to get to you the horror of what had happened. Above all else, there was a need to tell you everything, over and over and over again. And this was the most significant thing for me, realizing that you had to take it all." She spoke of what she thought of as her essential role: "After a while I began to realise the most important role for me there was to bear witness. Bearing witness to the vulnerability of humanity." "[There] wasn't so much grief as a pouring out of some ghastly vomit like a kind of horror." She described her work by saying, "Sometimes I found it necessary to say to people who I knew were not going to live: 'You are giving me your testimony and I will hold it for you and I will honour it and I will bear witness to what has happened to you.'" Part of her motivation for her journey to Belsen was about overcoming her own fears: "I felt I had to face something, the fear in myself. I had to understand other people's fear, and I had to understand something about overcoming fear – living. How does one live with the knowledge of atrocity?"

She remained in Germany for two and a half years, negotiating the evacuation to Switzerland of a group of young survivors suffering from tuberculosis.

=== Return to England ===
In 1947, Bamber returned to England. She worked with the Jewish Refugee Committee and was appointed to the Committee for the Care of Young Children from Concentration Camps. During the next eight years she trained to work with disturbed young adults and children while in close liaison with the Anna Freud Clinic. During this time she also undertook a part-time study in Social Science at the London School of Economics. Also in 1947, she married Rudi Bamberger, a German Jewish refugee from Nuremberg. His father had been beaten to death with fists and truncheons during the pogrom of fascist violence known as Kristallnacht (9–10 November 1938). He changed his name to the more British "Bamber" and the couple had two sons – Jonathan (now a physicist), and David (now a sculptor). The couple divorced, in 1970 after 23 years.

In 1958, Bamber was appointed Almoner at St. George in the East End Hospital and later at the Middlesex Hospital. Following her campaigning for children, Bamber became one of the founding members of the influential National Association for the Welfare of Children in Hospital. The organization established in Britain the practice of allowing a mother to remain with her young child. In 1961, Bamber joined the new Amnesty International (founded in May) and became chairman of the first British group. In 1974, she helped establish the Medical Group within the organization and was appointed secretary. In recognition of the Medical Group's work within Amnesty International, the British Medical Association established a Working Party on Torture. She led ground-breaking research into government torture in Chile, the Soviet Union, South Africa and Northern Ireland.

=== Medical Foundation for Care of Victims of Torture ===
She resigned from the Executive Council of Amnesty International in 1980 along with other members of the Medical Group. In 1985, they all left Amnesty and set up Medical Foundation for Care of Victims of Torture in rooms at the National Temperance Hospital in London, moving to Kentish Town two years later. As the Medical Group had dealt often with people whose injuries needed specialist physical and psychological help, they set out to provide long-term care to patients. They treated up to 3000 patients a year from over 90 countries, the role of therapist as one of witness – "to receive, not to recoil" and often "simply sit rocking somebody while they tell their story". In 2001, Comparing her early work with Holocaust survivors in Belsen, she said: "I think perhaps then and now – because I am now concerned with present day survivors from over 91 different countries – one is still bearing witness in the same way and that is the first gift you can give somebody who is a survivor." She continued as director until 2002 until stepping down to concentrate on her work with patients.

=== Helen Bamber Foundation ===
In 2005, at the age of 80, in response to changing patterns of global violence and an increasingly hostile political landscape, Bamber set up the Helen Bamber Foundation to expand her already established rehabilitative work with torture survivors.

The Helen Bamber Foundation (HBF) continues to receive more than 800 referrals each year. HBF provides expert care and support for refugees and asylum seekers who have suffered extreme physical, sexual and psychological violence, abuse and exploitation. Their clients have been subjected to atrocities including state-sponsored torture, religious / political persecution, human trafficking, forced labour, sexual exploitation, and gender-based violence. As a result of their experiences, survivors have multiple and complex needs including: acute psychological health conditions, severe physical injuries and medical conditions, extreme vulnerability to further exploitation, risk of further persecution, homelessness, destitution and intense loneliness. Its specialist team of therapists, doctors and legal experts hold an international reputation for providing therapeutic care, medical consultation, legal protection and practical support to refugees and asylum seekers who have experienced human rights violations.

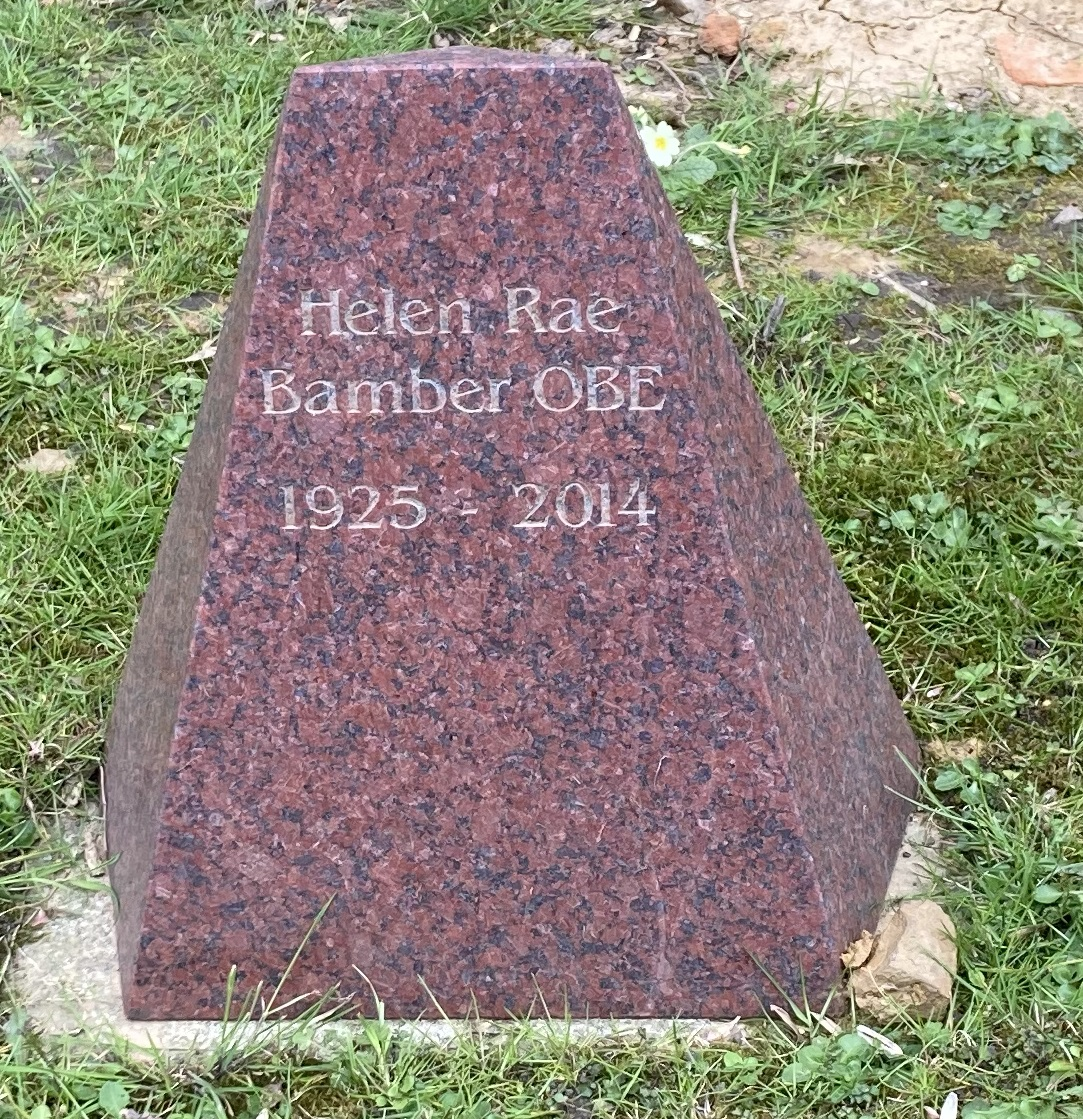
Grave of Helen Bamber in Highgate Cemetery

=== Retirement ===
In 2013, it was recognised that she would have to step back from the day-to-day running of the Foundation and Bamber assumed the new role of director emeritus (having previously been Clinical Director) of the Foundation. She died in August 2014 in London at the age of 89 and was buried on the eastern side of Highgate Cemetery.

== Awards and honours ==
- 1993: European Woman of Achievement
- 1997: OBE
- 1998: Lifetime's Achievement in Human Rights
- 2006: Beacon Fellowship Prize
- 2008: Jewish Care's Woman of Distinction
- 2009: Cannes Film Festival honoured the Helen Bamber Foundation advertising campaign, directed by Harold Monfils.
- 2009: Eileen Skellern Lifetime Achievement Award
- 2009: The Times/Sternberg Active Life Award
- 2009: Dag Hammarskjold Inspiration Award
- 2013: Inspiration Awards for Women – Human Rights Award

=== Honorary degrees ===
- University of Hull
- Oxford University
- University of Dundee
- University of Glasgow
- University of Ulster
- Kingston University
- The Open University
- Oxford Brookes University
- University of Essex
