= Ken Carslaw =

English researcher

Ken Carslaw FRS
- Born: Kenneth Stewart Carslaw
- Education: University of Birmingham; University of East Anglia
- Scientific career
- Fields: Aerosol; Climate; Clouds; Modeling
- Workplaces: Max Planck Institute for Chemistry; University of Leeds
- Thesis: The Properties of Aqueous Stratospheric Aerosols and the Depletion of Ozone (1994)
- Website: environment.leeds.ac.uk/see/staff/1196/professor-ken-carslaw

Kenneth Stewart Carslaw FRS is Professor of Atmospheric Science at the University of Leeds.

== Education ==
Carslaw was educated at the University of Birmingham (BSc, 1989) and the University of East Anglia (MSc, 1991; PhD, 1994).

== Career and research ==
He was awarded a Philip Leverhulme Prize in 2001, a Royal Society Wolfson Research Merit Award in 2011 and the American Geophysical Union Ascent Award in 2014. He is a Thomson Reuters Highly Cited Scientist.

He is Co-Chief Editor of the Journal Atmospheric Chemistry and Physics.

Carslaw was elected as a Fellow of the American Geophysical Union in 2019, and a Fellow of the Royal Society (FRS) in 2024.
