= Journal of Advances in Modeling Earth Systems =

Scientific journal of Earth system modeling

- Discipline: Earth system modeling, climate modeling
- Language: English
- Edited by: Stephen M. Griffies

Publication details
- History: 2009–present
- Publisher: Wiley for the American Geophysical Union (United States)
- Frequency: Monthly
- Open access: Yes
- License: CC BY, CC BY-NC, or CC BY-NC-ND

Standard abbreviations
- ISO 4: J. Adv. Model. Earth Syst.

Indexing
- ISSN: 1942-2466
- LCCN: 2008212549
- OCLC no.: 226402907

Links
- Journal homepage

The Journal of Advances in Modeling Earth Systems (JAMES) is a peer-reviewed open-access scientific journal published by Wiley for the American Geophysical Union (AGU). It publishes research on the science behind models of the Earth system and on what is learned from using them. The journal began publishing in 2009, with David A. Randall of Colorado State University as chief editor. As of 2026 its editor-in-chief is Stephen M. Griffies.

== Scope and content ==
The journal publishes original research on the science behind models of the Earth system and on what is learned from using them. Its scope takes in the atmosphere, the oceans, the land surface, and the cryosphere, and the physical, chemical, and biological processes that shape them.

When the journal began, its stated subject was climate science broadly. The topics it listed were the circulation of the atmosphere and the ocean, radiation, cloud physics, the boundary layer and the land surface, the biosphere and cryosphere, and biogeochemical cycles, together with numerical methods, parameterizations, and data assimilation. It had sections for research articles, review articles, and short contributions of up to four pages.

Robert Pincus, the journal's second editor-in-chief, wrote in 2021 that its focus had stayed on "models-as-ideas" and on work that advances the practice of modeling in general. Among the developments of the preceding years he listed nine special collections of papers describing the models that climate modeling centers had built for a large set of coordinated experiments, global forecasts with a resolution of about a kilometer, and the spread of machine learning.

== See also ==
- Geoscientific Model Development – a European Geosciences Union journal with a similar scope.
