= Earth System Dynamics =

- Discipline: Earth and atmospheric sciences
- Language: English
- Edited by: Somnath Baidya Roy, Ira Didenkulova, Axel Kleidon, & Ning Zeng

Publication details
- Publisher: Copernicus Publications
- Impact factor: 5.540 (2020)

Standard abbreviations
- ISO 4: Earth Syst. Dyn.

Indexing
- ISSN: 2190-4979 (print); 2190-4987 (web)

Links
- Journal homepage

Earth System Dynamics is a peer-reviewed open access scientific journal published by Copernicus Publications on behalf of the European Geosciences Union. The journal publishes articles describing original research on the geology, climate change, and atmospheric science.

According to the 2021 Journal Citation Reports, the journal has a 2020 impact factor of 5.540. The editors-in-chief are Somnath Baidya Roy, Ira Didenkulova, Axel Kleidon, & Ning Zeng. It uses open peer review system, where peer-review comments and replies are publicly available.
