= Geoscientific Model Development =

- Discipline: Geosciences
- Language: English
- Edited by: David Ham, Juan Antonio Añel, Astrid Kerkweg, Min-Hui Lo, Richard Neale, Rolf Sander & Paul Ullrich

Publication details
- History: 2008-present
- Publisher: Copernicus Publications on behalf of the European Geosciences Union
- Open access: Yes
- License: Creative Commons License
- Impact factor: 4.0 (2023)

Standard abbreviations
- ISO 4: Geosci. Model Dev.

Indexing
- ISSN: 1991-959X (print); 1991-9603 (web)
- LCCN: 2009205845
- OCLC no.: 309012016

Links
- Journal homepage; Online access; Online archive

Geoscientific Model Development is a peer-reviewed open access scientific journal published by Copernicus Publications on behalf of the European Geosciences Union. It covers the description, development, and evaluation of numerical models of the Earth system and its components.

The journal has a two-stage publication process. In the first stage, papers that pass a rapid access peer-review are immediately published on the Geoscientific Model Development Discussions website. They are then subject to interactive public discussion, during which the referees' comments (anonymous or attributed), additional short comments by other members of the scientific community (attributed), and the authors' replies are published. In the second stage, the peer-review process is completed and, if accepted, the final revised papers are published in Geoscientific Model Development.

== Abstracting and indexing ==
The journal is abstracted and indexed in the Science Citation Index Expanded, Scopus, Astrophysics Data System, and Current Contents/Physical, Chemical & Earth Sciences.

== See also ==
- Journal of Advances in Modeling Earth Systems – an American Geophysical Union journal with a similar scope.
