= Scientia Marina =

Peer-reviewed academic journal

- Discipline: Marine research
- Language: English
- Edited by: D. Vaqué

Publication details
- Former name: Investigación Pesquera
- History: 1955–present
- Publisher: Institut de Ciències del Mar de Barcelona
- Frequency: quarterly
- Open access: yes
- License: CC BY 3.0 ES
- Impact factor: 1.576 (2020)

Standard abbreviations
- ISO 4: Sci. Mar.

Indexing
- CODEN: SCIMEM
- ISSN: 0214-8358 (print); 1886-8134 (web)
- OCLC no.: 57397557

Links
- Journal homepage

Scientia Marina, formerly Investigación Pesquera, is a peer-reviewed academic journal on marine research published by Institut de Ciències del Mar de Barcelona (CSIC) since 1955. The journal is abstracted and indexed in the Science Citation Index, Current Contents/Agriculture, Biology and Environmental Sciences, Biosis, Food Science & Technology Abstracts, GEOBASE, DIALNET, and Scopus. According to the Journal Citation Reports, the journal has a 2020 impact factor of 1.576, ranking it 67th out of 110 journals in the category "Q3, Marine and Freshwater Research".

== See also ==
- Open access in Spain
