= German Geophysical Society =

- Deutsche Geophysikalische Gesellschaft (DGG)
- Formation: October 19, 1922; 103 years ago
- Founded at: Leipzig
- Type: Nonprofit, Registered association
- Headquarters: Hamburg
- Leader: Bodo Lehmann
- Website: dgg-online.de (in German)

The German Geophysical Society (German: Deutsche Geophysikalische Gesellschaft, DGG) is a German scientific association with the aim of promoting geophysics in research, teaching and application. It was founded in Leipzig in 1922 on the initiative of seismology professor Emil Wiechert, initially under the name German Seismological Society. It was renamed at the annual conference in 1924.

In addition to promoting geophysical knowledge in research, teaching and application, its main tasks include geophysical public relations work, cooperation with neighboring disciplines and the promotion of young scientists. The society represents German geophysics in national and international committees and gives out various awards.

Its former role as the official representative of Germany in the International Union of Geodesy and Geophysics was transferred to the National Committee for Geodesy and Geophysics, which was founded around 1970.

Most members are professional geophysicists; however, everybody who supports the aims of the society can become a member. Membership is terminated by resignation at the end of the calendar, in justified cases, members can be voted out by the board.
