= Lesley Wyborn =

Australian geoscientist and geoinformatics specialist

Lesley Wyborn is an Australian geoscientist and geoinformatics specialist, with a focus in high performance computing for geography and online analytics. She is an Adjunct Fellow at the Australian National University.

== Early life and education ==
Lesley graduated from the University of Sydney in 1972 with a Bachelor of Science in geology with 1st class honours. In 1973, she completed a Diploma of Education in Science and Mathematics at the University of Canberra. In 1978, she went on to complete a Doctor of Philosophy in geology and geochemistry at the Australian National University.

== Research and contributions ==
Wyborn has over 42 years in geoscience research and geoinformatics. She began her research career in geochemistry, focusing primarily on the geochemistry of granites, ore deposits and regional alteration systems. She began using computers in her research in 1994. She determined the essential parts of different Australian mineral systems and computationally modeled these parts to understand why ore deposits form in certain places.

Wyborn has played a major role in allowing geoscientists to use computers in research. She made contributions to the development of the Geoscience Markup Language (GeoSciML), which allows access to freely available geoscience data. She also led the development of the Open Geospatial Consortium She was the co-developer of the Australian Virtual Geophysics laboratory, which she worked on from 2012 to 2013.

Lesley's current research involves developing the NCI National Environmental Research Data Interoperability Platform (NERDIP) and the NeCTAR Virtual Geophysics Laboratory (VGL).

== Recognition ==
- 2025: Ian McHarg Medal, European Geosciences Union
