= Copernicus Publications =

Scientific publishing house

- Status: Active
- Founded: 1994
- Country of origin: Germany
- Headquarters location: Göttingen
- Distribution: Worldwide
- Publication types: Scientific journals
- Nonfiction topics: Earth science
- Official website: publications.copernicus.org

Copernicus Publications (also: Copernicus GmbH) is a publisher of scientific literature based in Göttingen, Germany. Founded in 1994, Copernicus Publications currently publishes 28 peer-reviewed open access scientific journals and other publications on behalf of the European Geosciences Union.

Copernicus Publications is part of the open-access publishing movement. Initially, the CC BY-NC was used. In 2007, they switched to the CC BY attribution license. Copernicus Publications has been described as the largest open access publisher in the Geo- and Earth system sciences, and it is known as one of the first publishers to embrace public peer review.

In 2014, after less than a year of publication, Copernius terminated publication of the Pattern Recognition in Physics journal, following allegations of nepotistic reviewing and malpractice; see Pattern Recognition in Physics#History for details.

== Publications and open access models ==
The table below lists the publications produced by Copernicus. Approach to open access varies by publication so this detail is also included.

Publication	Founded	Open access model
Advances in Statistical Climatology, Meteorology and Oceanography		
Aerosol Research		Diamond
Annales Geophysicae	1983	Gold
Archives Animal Breeding		
Atmospheric Chemistry and Physics	2001	Gold
Atmospheric Measurement Techniques	2008	
Biogeosciences	2004	
Climate of the Past	2005	
E&G Quaternary Science Journal		
Earth Surface Dynamics	2013	
Earth System Dynamics		
Earth System Science Data		
European Journal of Mineralogy		
Geochronology		
Geoscience Communication		
Geographica Helvetica		
Geoscientific Instrumentation, Methods and Data Systems		
Geoscientific Model Development	2008	
History of Geo- and Space Sciences	2010	
Hydrology and Earth System Sciences	1997	
Journal of Bone and Joint Infection		
Journal of Environmentally Compatible Air Transport System		
Journal of Micropalaeontology		
Journal of Sensors and Sensor Systems		
Magnetic Resonance		
Mechanical Sciences		
Natural Hazards and Earth System Sciences		
Nonlinear Processes in Geophysics	1994	
Ocean Science	2005	
Primate Biology		
Safety of Nuclear Waste Disposal		
Scientific Drilling		
SOIL		
Solid Earth	2010	
The Cryosphere		
Weather and Climate Dynamics		
Web Ecology		
Wind Energy Science		

== See also ==
- Category:Copernicus Publications academic journals
- Open Access Scholarly Publishers Association, of which Copernicus Publications is a founding member
- Open access in Germany
