= The Cryosphere =

Peer-reviewed scientific journal

- Discipline: Geoscience, glaciology
- Language: English
- Edited by: Chris Derksen, Christian Haas, Christian Hauck, Nanna Bjørnholt Karlsson, & Thomas Mölg

Publication details
- History: 2007-present
- Publisher: Copernicus Publications on behalf of the European Geosciences Union
- Frequency: Monthly
- Open access: Yes
- License: Creative Commons Attribution 4.0
- Impact factor: 4.4 (2023)

Standard abbreviations
- ISO 4: Cryosphere

Indexing
- ISSN: 1994-0416 (print); 1994-0424 (web)
- LCCN: 2008205824
- OCLC no.: 181910781

Links
- Journal homepage; Online archive

The Cryosphere is a monthly peer-reviewed scientific journal focusing on all aspects of frozen water and ground (especially glaciers) on Earth and on other planetary bodies. It was established in 2007 and is published by Copernicus Publications on behalf of the European Geosciences Union. The editors-in-chief are Chris Derksen (Environment and Climate Change Canada), Olaf Eisen (Alfred Wegener Institute for Polar and Marine Research), Christian Haas (Alfred Wegener Institute for Polar and Marine Research), Christian Hauck (University of Fribourg), Nanna Bjørnholt Karlsson (Geological Survey of Denmark and Greenland) and Thomas Mölg (University of Erlangen–Nuremberg). According to the Journal Citation Reports, the journal has a 2023 impact factor of 4.4.
