= European Geosciences Union =

International science society

- Formation: 7 September 2002; 24 years ago
- Merger of: European Geophysical Society and European Union of Geosciences
- Type: Non-profit organisation
- Purpose: Dedicated to the pursuit of excellence in the geosciences and the planetary and space sciences for the benefit of humanity
- Headquarters: Munich, Germany
- Members: Over 20,000 members (2023)
- President: Peter van der Beek
- Vice-president: Marian Holness
- R.O.R. Id: https://ror.org/03xphts16
- Website: www.egu.eu

The European Geosciences Union (EGU) is a non-profit international union in the fields of Earth, planetary, and space sciences whose vision is to "realise a sustainable and just future for humanity and for the planet". The organisation has headquarters in Munich, Germany. Membership is open to individuals who are professionally engaged in or associated with these fields and related studies, including students, early career scientists and retired seniors.

The EGU publishes 19 public peer-reviewed open-access scientific journals and a number of other science publications. It also organises several topical meetings, as well training events and summer schools, and provides support and funding for numerous education and outreach activities. Its most prominent event is the EGU General Assembly, an annual conference that brings together over 18,000 scientists from all over the world. The meeting's sessions cover a wide range of topics, including volcanology, planetary exploration, the Earth's internal structure and atmosphere, climate change, and renewable energies.

The EGU has 22 scientific divisions that reflect the interdisciplinary nature of the organisation.

== History ==
The EGU was established by the merger of the European Geophysical Society (EGS) and the European Union of Geosciences (EUG) on 7 September 2002. Council members of the two organisations came together at Hotel Platzl in Munich, Germany, to sign the Union into existence. The final stages of the merger were completed on 31 December 2003. The EGU founding members were:

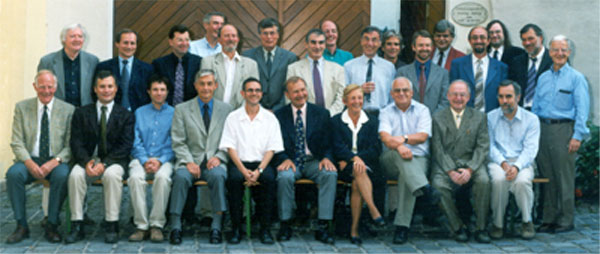
EGU founding members 2002

Jan Backman, Jonathan Bamber, Ray Bates, Günter Blöschl, Lars Clemmensen, Max Coleman, Peter Fabian, Gerald Ganssen, Jean-Pierre Gattuso, David Gee, Fausto Guzzetti, Albrecht Hofmann, Jürgen Kurths, Yves Langevin, John Ludden, Arne Richter, Michael Rycroft, W. Schlager, Roland Schlich, Isabella Premovi Silva, Christopher Spotl, Håkan Svedhem, Hans Thybo, Bert Vermeersen, David Webb, Jerzy Weber, Richard Worden.

On 12 February 2004, the EGU signed the Berlin Declaration on Open Access to Knowledge in the Sciences and Humanities.

On 1 August 2010, the EGU Executive Office moved to central Munich and later expanded by hiring six more staff members in addition to the EGU Executive Secretary, Philippe Courtial. In August 2011, the EGU signed an agreement with the American Geophysical Union (AGU) and with the Asia Oceania Geosciences Society (AOGS) with the aim to promote the cooperation between the institutions.

In June 2019, the EGU announced a new chapter in its history: the Union launched a new strategy and moved its Executive Office to new premises in the Berg am Laim area of Munich.

== Presidents ==
The presidents of the European Geosciences Union have been:

- Andre Berger (Honorary President)
- Peter Fabian (2002–2005)
- John Ludden (2005–2007)
- Gerald Ganssen (2007–2009)
- Tuija Pulkkinen (2009–2011)
- Donald Bruce Dingwell 2011–2013)
- Günter Blöschl (2013–2015)
- Hans Thybo (2015–2017)
- Jonathan Bamber (2017–2019)
- Alberto Montanari (2019–2021)
- Helen Glaves (2021–2023)
- Irina Artemieva (2023–2024)
- Peter van der Beek (2024–)

== Conferences and meetings ==
The European Geosciences Union convenes a yearly General Assembly. The first EGU General Assembly took place from 25 to 30 April 2004, in Nice, with the aim to gather together EGU members and other Earth, planetary, and space scientists from all around the world. On this occasion the EGU also celebrated researchers for their contribution, with 21 Union and division prizes and medals. The EGU General Assembly moved to Vienna in April 2005 where it has since taken place annually, at the Austria Center Vienna. The first EGU co-sponsored geoscience meeting (the first Alexander von Humboldt conference) was held in Guayaquil. Afterwards, the co-sponsored programme expanded into conference series, meetings, workshops and training schools. The EGU Galileo Conferences cycle started in 2015 when the first call for proposals was launched.

At the 2019 meeting in Vienna, there were 5,531 oral, 9,432 poster, and 1,287 interactive content (PICO) presentations. Over 16,000 scientists from 113 countries participated in the conference Abstracts of presentations are published in the Geophysical Research Abstracts (print: ISSN 1029-7006, online: ISSN 1607-7962). The 2018 EGU General Assembly hosted 15,075 scientists from 106 countries participated, of which 53% were under the age of 35 years. Over 17,000 abstracts were presented at the meeting.

== Publications ==
Since 2001, the EGU and Copernicus Publications have published a growing number of peer-reviewed open-access scientific journals. This includes one of the first examples of open access journals, and a pioneer of open review, Atmospheric Chemistry and Physics.

The first EGU newsletter came out in November 2002. The Eggs magazine became the EGU newsletter after the completing of the merging between EGS and EUG in 2003. The three-monthly newsletter was modernised in late 2012 and both its format and its name were changed in GeoQ. The necessity to give reports of its activities on a more regular basis, led the EGU to further change its newsletter format and name (now EGU newsletter) in January 2015. The actual newsletter is an e-mail version, having a monthly frequency. At the General Assembly, the EGU has a daily newsletter called EGU Today.

In 2010 the EGU released its official blog, which soon became a quick-to-read source of information about the EGU activities and on research in the Earth, planetary and space sciences fields. The blog has now grown to include division blogs and network blogs.

EGU has also published academic books and other publications.

=== Journals ===
In October 2002 the first EGU journals were published by transferring the property of the EGS publications Advances in Geosciences (ADGEO), Annales Geophysicae (ANGEO), Atmospheric Chemistry and Physics (ACP), Hydrology and Earth System Sciences (HESS), Natural Hazards and Earth System Sciences (NHESS) and Nonlinear Processes in Geophysics (NPG) – to the EGU. The open access journals Biogeosciences (BG) and Ocean Sciences (OS) had been launched via Copernicus Publications in March and November 2004, respectively. In 2005, EGU launched the open access journals Climate of the Past (CP) and eEarth in July and October, respectively through Copernicus Publications. The latter was replaced by Solid Earth journal in 2009. The open access journals The Cryosphere (TC) and Geoscientific Model Development (GMD) were released in 2007 via Copernicus Publications. In June 2007, the EGU launched Imaggeo, an open access database featuring photos and videos relating geosciences. In August 2008, the Atmospheric Measurement Techniques (AMT) journal was first published, and the journals Solid Earth (SE) and Earth System Dynamics (ESD) began publication in February and March 2010 respectively. In 2011, Geoscientific Instrumentation, Methods and Data Systems (GI) was first published. On 7 April 2013 the open access journals Earth Surface Dynamics (ESurf) and SOIL were launched via Copernicus Publications. In April 2018, EGU launched the open access journal Geoscience Communication (GC) and the compilation Encyclopedia of Geosciences (EG), a collection of articles in between traditional review articles and online encyclopediae. EGU's newest journals are Geochronology, launched in April 2019, and Weather and Climate Dynamics, launched in August 2019.

- Annales Geophysicae: covers the sciences of the Sun-Earth system, including space weather, solar-terrestrial plasma physics, and the Earth's atmosphere.
- Atmospheric Chemistry and Physics: covers the Earth's atmosphere and the underlying chemical and physical processes. It covers the altitude range from the land and ocean surface up to the turbopause, including the troposphere, stratosphere, and mesosphere.
- Atmospheric Measurement Techniques: covers remote sensing, in-situ and laboratory measurement techniques for the constituents and properties of the Earth's atmosphere.
- Biogeosciences: covers all aspects of the interactions between the biological, chemical, and physical processes in terrestrial or extraterrestrial life with the geosphere, hydrosphere, and atmosphere.
- Climate of the Past: covers the climate history of the Earth, including all temporal scales of climate change and variability, from geological time through to multidecadal studies of the last century.
- Earth Surface Dynamics: covers the physical, chemical and biological processes shaping the Earth's surface and their interactions on all scales.
- Earth System Dynamics: covers the functioning of the whole Earth system and global change.
- Geochronology: covers physical, chemical, and biological processes used to quantify time in all environmental and geological settings throughout Earth's history.
- Geoscience Communication: covers all aspects of outreach, public engagement, widening participation, knowledge exchange
- Geoscientific Instrumentation, Methods and Data Systems: covers the area of geoscientific instruments.
- Geoscientific Model Development: covers numerical models of the Earth system and its components.
- Hydrology and Earth System Sciences: covers research in hydrology, placed within a holistic Earth system science context.
- Natural Hazards and Earth System Sciences: covers research on natural hazards.
- Nonlinear Processes in Geophysics: covers nonlinear processes in all branches of Earth, planetary, and solar system sciences.
- Ocean Science: covers all aspects of ocean science.
- Soil: covers soil system sciences at the interface between the atmosphere, lithosphere, hydrosphere, and biosphere.
- Solid Earth: covers the composition, structure and dynamics of the Earth from the surface to the deep interior at all spatial and temporal scales.
- The Cryosphere: covers all aspects of frozen water and ground on Earth and on other planetary bodies.
- Weather and Climate Dynamics: covers all aspects of dynamical processes in the atmosphere.

== Awards ==
The EGU bestows a number of annual awards and medals to recognise scientific achievements.

Four of these medals are at union level:

- the Arthur Holmes Medal for Solid Earth Geosciences,
- the Alfred Wegener Medal for atmospheric, hydrological, or ocean sciences,
- the Jean Dominique Cassini Medal for planetary and space sciences, and
- the Alexander von Humboldt Medal for scientists from developing countries (with emphasis on Latin America and Africa), who have achieved exceptional international standing in geosciences and planetary and space sciences, defined in their widest senses.

The EGU also has four union awards:

- the Angela Croome Award, for Earth, space and planetary sciences journalism
- the Arne Richter Awards for Outstanding Early Career Scientists (formerly Outstanding Young Scientist Award), for achievements made by early career scientists in the Earth, planetary, and space sciences (these awards are selected from the Division level Outstanding Early Career Scientists Award Winners.
- the Katia and Maurice Krafft Award, for geoscience outreach and engagement
- Union Service Award, for outstanding services for the EGU.

=== Division level awards ===
At division level there are medals for outstanding scientists and division awards for early career researchers. Each year Outstanding Student Poster and PICO Awards are selected for participating divisions.

- Alina Kabata-Pendias Medal, Soil System Sciences
- Augustus Love Medal, Geodynamics
- Beno Gutenberg Medal, Seismology
- Christiaan Huygens Medal, Geosciences Instrumentation and Data Systems
- David Bates Medal, Planetary and Solar System Sciences
- Fridtjof Nansen Medal, Ocean Sciences
- Hannes Alfvén Medal, Solar-Terrestrial Sciences
- Hans Oeschger Medal, Climate: Past, Present & Future
- Henry Darcy Medal, Hydrological Sciences
- The Ian McHarg Medal, named after Ian McHarg, is awarded by the Earth and Space Science Informatics Division for research in information technology applied to Earth and space sciences.
  - Recipients: Lesley Wyborn 2025, François Robida 2024, Mikhail Kanevski 2022, Paul Wessel 2020, Stefano Nativi 2019, Kerstin A. Lehnert 2018, Helen Glaves 2016, Alessandro Annoni 2013, Peter Fox 2012, Monique Petitdidier 2011
- Jean Baptiste Lamarck Medal, Stratigraphy, Sedimentology and Palaeontology
- John Dalton Medal, Hydrological Sciences
- Julia and Johannes Weertman Medal, Cryospheric Sciences
- Julius Bartels Medal, Solar-Terrestrial Sciences
- Lewis Fry Richardson Medal, Nonlinear Processes in Geosciences
- Louis Néel Medal, Earth Magnetism & Rock Physics
- Marie Tharp Medal, Tectonics and Structural Geology
- Milutin Milanković Medal, Climate: Past, Present & Future
- Petrus Peregrinus Medal, Earth Magnetism & Rock Physics
- Philippe Duchaufour Medal, Soil System Sciences
- Plinius Medal, Natural Hazards
- Ralph Alger Bagnold Medal, Geomorphology
- Robert Wilhelm Bunsen Medal, Geochemistry, Mineralogy, Petrology & Volcanology
- Runcorn-Florensky Medal, Planetary and Solar System Sciences
- Sergey Soloviev Medal, Natural Hazards
- Vening Meinesz Medal, Geodesy
- Vilhelm Bjerknes Medal, Atmospheric Sciences
- Vladimir Ivanovich Vernadsky Medal, Biogeosciences

== See also ==
- List of geoscience organizations
- Journals published by the EGU
