= GEOBASE =

Bibliographic database for geosciences

- Producer: Elsevier

Access
- Cost: Subscription

Coverage
- Disciplines: Geographical, Earth, and ecological sciences
- Record depth: Index and abstract
- Format coverage: Academic and trade journals
- Temporal coverage: 1980–present

Links
- Website: www.elsevier.com/online-tools/engineering-village/contentdatabase-overview#id03
- Title list(s): www.elsevier.com/__data/assets/excel_doc/0003/224814/GEOBASE-SOURCE-LIST-as-of-June-2014.xlsx

GEOBASE is a database, multidisciplinary in scope, which indexes bibliographic information and abstracts for the Geographical, Earth, and Ecological sciences, published by Engineering Information, a subsidiary of Elsevier. The broad subject coverage includes earth sciences, ecology, geomechanics, human geography, physical geography, social geography and oceanography. Development studies are also included in this database.

== Coverage ==
Coverage includes 2000 peer reviewed journal, and trade journal titles. Other journal titles and books are included in the archival coverage of this database. With more than 2 million records, it has temporal coverage from 1980 to the present. Each year, at least 100,000 additional citations and abstracts are added, and it is updated every two weeks. Access is covered through both online (internet), and CD-ROM.

Other types of publications indexed in this database are magazine articles, product reviews, directories and all related materials. International literature coverage pertains to Non-English language papers, and lesser available books, conference proceedings and reports.

Subject coverage also includes cartography, hydrology, climatology, meteorology, energy, paleontology, environment, petrology, geochemistry, photogrammetry, geomorphology, sedimentology, geophysics, and volcanology.

== Print counterparts ==
The GEOBASE database is covered in print, in the following abstracts journals:

- Geographical Abstracts: Human Geography
- Geographical Abstracts: Physical Geography
- Geological Abstracts
- Ecological Abstracts
- International Development Abstracts
- Oceanographic Literature Review
- Geomechanics Abstracts

=== Geographical Abstracts: Human Geography ===
ISSN 0953-9611, LCCN:89646812

This database is published monthly, and contains abstracts from 2000 journals. It provides bibliographic coverage of each abstracted journal. Geographical Abstracts: Physical Geography, and Fluid Abstracts: Civil Engineering are considered to be of related interest.

This database was formed by the union of the following abstracts journals:

- Geographical abstracts. C, Economic geography (1986) ISSN 0268-7895 OCoLC: 13548872
- Geographical abstracts. D, Social and historical geography ISSN 0268-7909 (OCoLC)13645587
- Geographical abstracts. F, Regional and community planning ISSN 8665-8026 (OCoLC)13646354.

=== Geographical Abstracts: Physical Geography ===
ISSN 0954-0504

This database is published monthly, and contains abstracts from 2000 journals. It provides bibliographic coverage of each abstracted journal.
