= GeoRef =

Bibliographic database for geosciences

- Producer: American Geosciences Institute (United States)
- History: 1966 to present

Access
- Cost: Subscription

Coverage
- Disciplines: geosciences
- Record depth: Index & abstract
- Format coverage: articles, books, maps, conference papers, reports and theses
- Temporal coverage: 1666 to present
- Geospatial coverage: Worldwide
- No. of records: 4.3 million

Links
- Website: www.americangeosciences.org/georef/georef-information-services

The GeoRef database is a bibliographic database that indexes scientific literature in the geosciences, including geology. Coverage ranges from 1666 to the present for North American literature, and 1933 to the present for the rest of the world. It currently contains more than 4.3 million references. It is widely considered one of the preeminent literature databases for those studying the earth sciences.

It is produced by the American Geosciences Institute, which was known as the American Geological Institute until October 2011.

"To maintain the database, GeoRef editor/indexers regularly scan more than 3,500 journals in 40 languages as well as new books, maps, and reports. They record the bibliographic data for each document and assign index terms to describe it. Each month between 6,000 and 9,000 new references are added to the database."

Major areas of coverage by GeoRef include:

- Areal geology
- Economic geology
- Engineering geology
- Environmental geology
- Extraterrestrial geology
- Geochemistry
- Geochronology
- Geophysics
- Hydrogeology and hydrology
- Marine geology and oceanography
- Mathematical geology
- Mineralogy and Crystallography
- Paleontology
- Petrology
- Seismology
- Stratigraphy
- Structural geology
- Surficial geology

Print publications that correspond to GeoRef are Bibliography and Index of North American Geology; Bibliography of Theses in Geology; and the Geophysical Abstracts, Bibliography and Index of Geology Exclusive of North America.

== See also ==
- List of academic databases and search engines

== Bibliography ==
- Bichteler, Julie (1991). "Geologists and Gray Literature". Science & Technology Libraries. 11 (3): 39–50. doi:10.1300/J122v11n03_04.
- Masahiro, Ichiki; Modeki Riko; Nakamura Yasuyuki; Shibao Mikio (2000). "Leading Edge of Earth Science Technology. An Introduction of the Comprehensive Earth Science Data Base, GeoRef". Journal of Geography. 109 (6): 993–1005. doi:10.5026/jgeography.109.6_993.
