= Scholarly peer review =

Subjecting an author's work or research to scrutiny

Scholarly peer review or academic peer review (also known as refereeing) is the process of having a researcher's methods and findings reviewed (usually anonymously) by experts (or "peers") in the same field. Peer review is widely used for helping the academic publisher (i.e., the editor-in-chief, the editorial board, or the program committee) decide whether the work should be accepted, considered acceptable with revisions, or rejected for official publication in an academic journal, a monograph, or in the proceedings of an academic conference. If the identities of authors are not revealed to each other, the procedure is called dual-anonymous peer review.

Academic peer review requires a community of experts in a given (and often narrowly defined) academic field, who are qualified and able to perform reasonably impartial review. Impartial review, especially of work in less narrowly defined or inter-disciplinary fields, may be difficult to accomplish, and the significance (good or bad) of an idea may never be widely appreciated among its contemporaries. Peer review is widely used to increase academic quality and is used in most major scholarly journals. However, criticism of peer review include failure to prevent publication of invalid research or scientific fraud, low correlation with future impact, slowness, and lack of accountability.

== History ==
The first record of an editorial pre-publication peer-review is from 1665 by Henry Oldenburg, the founding editor of Philosophical Transactions of the Royal Society at the Royal Society of London.

The first peer-reviewed publication might have been the Medical Essays and Observations published by the Royal Society of Edinburgh in 1731. The present-day peer-review system evolved from this 18th-century process, began to involve external reviewers in the mid-19th-century, and did not become commonplace until the mid-20th-century.

Peer review became a touchstone of the scientific method, but until the end of the 19th century was often performed directly by an editor-in-chief or editorial committee. Editors of scientific journals at that time made publication decisions without seeking outside input, i.e. an external panel of reviewers, giving established authors latitude in their journalistic discretion. For example, Albert Einstein's four revolutionary Annus Mirabilis papers in the 1905 issue of Annalen der Physik were evaluated by the journal's editor-in-chief, Max Planck, and its co-editor, Wilhelm Wien, both future Nobel prize winners and together experts on the topics of these papers. On a much later occasion, Einstein was severely critical of the external review process, saying that he had not authorized John Torrence Tate Sr., the editor in chief of Physical Review, to show his manuscript "to specialists before it is printed", and informing him that he would "publish the paper elsewhere" – which he did, with substantial modifications.

While some medical journals started to systematically appoint external reviewers, it is only since the middle of the 20th century that this practice has spread widely and that external reviewers have been given some visibility within academic journals, including being thanked by authors and editors. A 2003 editorial in Nature stated that, in the early 20th century, "the burden of proof was generally on the opponents rather than the proponents of new ideas." Nature itself instituted formal peer review only in 1967. Journals such as Science and the American Journal of Medicine increasingly relied on external reviewers in the 1950s and 1960s, in part to reduce the editorial workload. In the 20th century, peer review also became common for science funding allocations. This process appears to have developed independently from that of editorial peer review.

Pragmatically, peer review refers to the work done during the screening of submitted manuscripts. This process encourages authors to meet the accepted standards of their discipline and reduces the dissemination of irrelevant findings, unwarranted claims, unacceptable interpretations, and personal views. Publications that have not undergone peer review are likely to be regarded with suspicion by academic scholars and professionals. Non-peer-reviewed work does not contribute, or contributes less, to the academic credit of a scholar (such as the h-index), although this heavily depends on the field.

== Justification ==
[P]eer review in its ideal form is both an act of altruism and an act of investment in the continuation of the scholarly enterprise by our colleagues. That is why it is so important to engage in thoughtful peer review as a scholar, and that is why it is important to do it well, acting not as a gatekeeper, but as a fellow contributor in the creation of knowledge. Collective wisdom.

— Anna Marie Roos, editor-in-chief of Notes and Records: the Royal Society Journal of the History of Science, 2022

It is difficult and time-consuming for authors and researchers, whether individually or in a team, to spot and provide feedback on every mistake or flaw in a complicated piece of work. This is not necessarily a reflection on those concerned, but because with a new and perhaps eclectic subject, an opportunity for improvement may be more obvious to someone with special expertise or who simply looks at it with a fresh eye. Therefore, showing work to others increases the probability that weaknesses will be identified and improved. For both grant-funding and publication in a scholarly journal, it is also normally a requirement that the subject is both novel and substantial.

The decision whether or not to publish a scholarly article, or what should be modified before publication, ultimately lies with the publisher (editor-in-chief or the editorial board) to which the manuscript has been submitted. Similarly, the decision whether or not to fund a proposed project rests with an official of the funding agency. These individuals usually refer to the opinion of one or more reviewers in making their decision. This is primarily for three reasons:

- Workload. A small group of editors/assessors cannot devote sufficient time to each of the many articles submitted to many journals.
- Miscellany of ideas. Were the editor/assessor to judge all submitted material themselves, approved material would solely reflect their opinion.
- Limited expertise. An editor/assessor cannot be expected to be sufficiently expert in all areas covered by a single journal or funding agency to adequately judge all submitted material.

Reviewers are often anonymous and independent. However, some reviewers may choose to waive their anonymity, and in other limited circumstances, such as the examination of a formal complaint against the referee, or a court order, the reviewer's identity may have to be disclosed. Anonymity may be unilateral or reciprocal (single- or double-blinded reviewing).

Since reviewers are normally selected from experts in the fields discussed in the article, the process of peer review helps to keep some invalid or unsubstantiated claims out of the body of published research and knowledge. Scholars will read published articles outside their limited area of detailed expertise, and then rely, to some degree, on the peer-review process to have provided reliable and credible research that they can build upon for subsequent or related research. Significant scandal ensues when an author is found to have falsified the research included in an article, as other scholars, and the field of study itself, may have relied upon the invalid research.

For US universities, peer reviewing of books before publication is a requirement for full membership of the Association of American University Presses.

As experimentally controlled studies of this process are difficult to arrange, direct evidence that peer review improves the quality of published papers is scarce. One recent analysis of randomized controlled trial abstracts found that editorial and peer review processes led to substantive improvements between submission and publication.

== Procedure ==
In the case of proposed publications, the publisher (editor-in-chief or the editorial board, often with assistance of corresponding or associate editors) sends advance copies of an author's work or ideas to researchers or scholars who are experts in the field (known as "referees" or "reviewers"). Communication is nowadays normally by e-mail or through a web-based manuscript processing system such as ScholarOne, Scholastica, or Open Journal Systems. Depending on the field of study and on the specific journal, there are usually one to three referees for a given article. For example, Springer states that there are two or three reviewers per article.

The peer-review process involves three steps:

=== Step 1: Desk evaluation ===
An editor evaluates the manuscript to judge whether the paper will be passed on to journal referees. At this phase many articles receive a "desk reject", that is, the editor chooses not to pass along the article. The authors may or may not receive a letter of explanation.

Desk rejection is intended to be a streamlined process so that editors may move past nonviable manuscripts quickly and provide authors with the opportunity to pursue a more suitable journal. For example, the European Accounting Review editors subject each manuscript to three questions to decide whether a manuscript moves forward to referees: 1) Is the article a fit for the journal's aims and scope, 2) is the paper content (e.g. literature review, methods, conclusions) sufficient and does the paper make a worthwhile contribution to the larger body of literature, and 3) does it follow format and technical specifications? If "no" to any of these, the manuscript receives a desk rejection.

Desk rejection rates vary by journal. For example, in 2017 researchers at the World Bank compiled rejection rates of several global economics journals; the desk rejection rate ranged from 21% (Economic Lacea) to 66% (Journal of Development Economics). The American Psychological Association publishes rejection rates for several major publications in the field, and although they do not specify whether the rejection is pre- or post- desk evaluation, their figures in 2016 ranged from a low of 49% to a high of 90%.

=== Step 2: External review ===
If the paper is not desk rejected, the editors send the manuscript to the referees, who are chosen for their expertise and distance from the authors. At this point, referees may reject, accept without changes (rare) or instruct the authors to revise and resubmit.

Reasons vary for acceptance of an article by editors, but Elsevier published an article where three editors weigh in on factors that drive article acceptance. These factors include whether the manuscript: delivers "new insight into an important issue", will be useful to practitioners, advances or proposes a new theory, raises new questions, has appropriate methods and conclusion, presents a good argument based on the literature, and tells a good story. One editor notes that he likes papers that he "wished he'd done" himself.

These referees each return an evaluation of the work to the editor, noting weaknesses or problems along with suggestions for improvement. Typically, most of the referees' comments are eventually seen by the author, though a referee can also send 'for your eyes only' comments to the publisher; scientific journals observe this convention almost universally. The editor then evaluates the referees' comments, her or his own opinion of the manuscript before passing a decision back to the author(s), usually with the referees' comments.

Referees' evaluations usually include an explicit recommendation of what to do with the manuscript or proposal, often chosen from options provided by the journal or funding agency. For example, Nature recommends four courses of action:

- to unconditionally accept the manuscript or the proposal,
- to accept it in the event that its authors improve it in certain ways
- to reject it, but encourage revision and invite re-submission
- to reject it outright.

During this process, the role of the referees is advisory. The editor(s) is typically under no obligation to accept the opinions of the referees. However, the editor will most often follow the advice of the referees. Furthermore, the referees in scientific publication do not act as a group, do not communicate with each other, and typically are not aware of each other's identities or evaluations. Proponents argue that if the reviewers of a paper are unknown to each other, the editor(s) can more easily verify the objectivity of the reviews. There is usually no requirement that the referees achieve consensus, with the decision instead often made by the editor(s) based on her best judgement of the arguments.

In situations where multiple referees disagree substantially about the quality of a work, there are a number of strategies for reaching a decision. The paper may be rejected outright, or the editor may choose which reviewer's point the authors should address. When a publisher receives very positive and very negative reviews for the same manuscript, the editor will often solicit one or more additional reviews as a tie-breaker. As another strategy in the case of ties, the publisher may invite authors to reply to a referee's criticisms and permit a compelling rebuttal to break the tie. If a publisher does not feel confident to weigh the persuasiveness of a rebuttal, the publisher may solicit a response from the referee who made the original criticism. An editor may convey communications back and forth between authors and a referee, in effect allowing them to debate a point.

Even in these cases, however, publishers do not allow multiple referees to confer with each other, though each reviewer may often see earlier comments submitted by other reviewers. The goal of the process is explicitly not to reach consensus or to persuade anyone to change their opinions, but instead to provide material for an informed editorial decision. One early study regarding referee disagreement found that agreement was greater than chance, if not much greater than chance, on six of seven article attributes (e.g. literature review and final recommendation to publish), but this study was small and it was conducted on only one journal. At least one study has found that reviewer disagreement is not common, but this study is also small and on only one journal.

Traditionally, reviewers would often remain anonymous to the authors, but this standard varies both with time and with academic field. In some academic fields, most journals offer the reviewer the option of remaining anonymous or not, or a referee may opt to sign a review, thereby relinquishing anonymity. Published papers sometimes contain, in the acknowledgments section, thanks to anonymous or named referees who helped improve the paper. For example, Nature journals provide this option.

Sometimes authors may exclude certain reviewers: one study conducted on the Journal of Investigative Dermatology found that excluding reviewers doubled the chances of article acceptance. Some scholars are uncomfortable with this idea, arguing that it distorts the scientific process. Others argue that it protects against referees who are biased in some manner (e.g. professional rivalry, grudges). In some cases, authors can choose referees for their manuscripts. mSphere, an open-access journal in microbial science, has moved to this model. Editor-in-Chief Mike Imperiale says this process is designed to reduce the time it takes to review papers and permit the authors to choose the most appropriate reviewers. But a scandal in 2015 shows how this choosing reviewers can encourage fraudulent reviews. Fake reviews were submitted to the Journal of the Renin-Angiotensin-Aldosterone System in the names of author-recommended reviewers, causing the journal to eliminate this option.

=== Step 3: Revisions ===
If the manuscript has not been rejected during peer review, it returns to the authors for revisions. During this phase, the authors address the concerns raised by reviewers. William Stafford Noble offers ten rules for responding to reviewers. His rules include:

1. "Provide an overview, then quote the full set of reviews"
2. "Be polite and respectful of all reviewers"
3. "Accept the blame"
4. "Make the response self-contained"
5. "Respond to every point raised by the reviewer"
6. "Use typography to help the reviewer navigate your response"
7. "Whenever possible, begin your response to each comment with a direct answer to the point being raised"
8. "When possible, do what the reviewer asks"
9. "Be clear about what changed relative to the previous version"
10. "If necessary, write the response twice" (i.e. write a version for "venting" but then write a version the reviewers will see)

In economics, some scholars have argued that the revision stage has expanded from evaluation into excessive improvement demands. A 2024 review of economics peer review described referee overreach and excessive revisions as contributing to longer papers and slower publication.

== Recruiting referees ==
At a journal or book publisher, the task of picking reviewers typically falls to an editor. When a manuscript arrives, an editor solicits reviews from scholars or other experts who may or may not have already expressed a willingness to referee for that journal or book division. Granting agencies typically recruit a panel or committee of reviewers in advance of the arrival of applications.

Referees are supposed to inform the editor of any conflict of interests that might arise. Journals or individual editors may invite a manuscript's authors to name people whom they consider qualified to referee their work. For some journals this is a requirement of submission. Authors are sometimes also given the opportunity to name natural candidates who should be disqualified, in which case they may be asked to provide justification (typically expressed in terms of conflict of interest).

Editors solicit author input in selecting referees because academic writing typically is very specialized. Editors often oversee many specialties, and can not be experts in all of them. But after an editor selects referees from the pool of candidates, the editor typically is obliged not to disclose the referees' identities to the authors, and in scientific journals, to each other. Policies on such matters differ among academic disciplines. One difficulty with respect to some manuscripts is that, there may be few scholars who truly qualify as experts, people who have themselves done work similar to that under review. This can frustrate the goals of reviewer anonymity and avoidance of conflicts of interest. Low-prestige or local journals and granting agencies that award little money are especially handicapped with regard to recruiting experts.

A potential hindrance in recruiting referees is that they are usually not paid, largely because doing so would itself create a conflict of interest. Furthermore, reviewing takes time away from their main activities, such as conducting their own research. To the would-be recruiter's advantage, most potential referees are authors themselves, or at least readers, who know that the publication system requires that experts donate their time. Serving as a referee can even be a condition of a grant, or professional association membership. In general, because of the explosion of the electronic information and the disproportionate increase in journal number versus the steady increase in the number of scientists has created a peer review crisis. The system currently in place is not responding to modern needs and will inevitably perish, unless radical reforms are made promptly. The academic system should revolutionize and establish strict peer review activity criteria essential for promotion and tenure, based on established universal metrics. That is, reward reviewers academically as it rewards researchers, which is currently not the case. All other incentives have failed.

Referees have the opportunity to prevent work that does not meet the standards of the field from being published, which is a position of some responsibility. Editors are at a special advantage in recruiting a scholar when they have overseen the publication of their work, or if the scholar is one who hopes to submit manuscripts to that editor's publishing entity in the future. Granting agencies, similarly, tend to seek referees among their present or former grantees.

Peerage of Science was an independent service and a community where reviewer recruitment happens via Open Engagement: authors submit their manuscript to the service where it is made accessible for any non-affiliated scientist, and 'validated users' choose themselves what they want to review. The motivation to participate as a peer reviewer comes from a reputation system where the quality of the reviewing work is judged and scored by other users, and contributes to user profiles. Peerage of Science does not charge any fees to scientists, and does not pay peer reviewers. Participating publishers however pay to use the service, gaining access to all ongoing processes and the opportunity to make publishing offers to the authors.

With independent peer review services the author usually retains the right to the work throughout the peer review process, and may choose the most appropriate journal to submit the work to. Peer review services may also provide advice or recommendations on most suitable journals for the work. Journals may still want to perform an independent peer review, without the potential conflict of interest that financial reimbursement may cause, or the risk that an author has contracted multiple peer review services but only presents the most favorable one.

An alternative or complementary model for achieving peer review is for the author to pay to have it undertaken. An example of such a service provider was Rubriq (2013–2017), which financially compensated peer reviewers for reviewing each work that they were assigned.

== Different styles ==
=== Internal and external peer review ===
External peer review is the ordinary process of peer review for scholarly journals. The first evidence of formal external peer reviews dates back to 1752, and it became widely used and more standardized after World War II. In this process, scholars who are not beholden to the journal or the author review submitted articles, and in doing so, restrain academic and scientific journals from using solely their own commercial interests as a guide on what to publish. Nature began requiring external peer review in 1973, and other journals quickly followed suit.

Internal peer review is having a colleague in the same department or academic institution read over a paper before submitting it to a journal for external peer review. For example, economists in the same government agency may review their peers' papers, as a type of peer professional accountability. People such as Nobel laureate Dan Shechtman and organizations such as the US National Institute of Standards and Technology use internal peer review because they believe that it gives them an opportunity to improve papers before submitting them to a journal. Internal peer review is also recommended for authors with weak writing skills. Unlike external peer review, internal peer reviewers do not have any distance from institutional goals and are not as effective as independent external reviewers at mitigating conflicts of interest. Internal peer reviewers also suffer from an in-house expert bias, thus overlooking problems that would be spotted by someone outside the organization or by someone from an adjacent academic discipline. Internal peer review has also been used to improve the quality of research grant applications.

The phrase internal peer review is also used to describe post-submission review by a journal's editors, before sending them out for external peer review. The Health Policy and Planning journal, for example, reports that 60% of submitted articles are rejected by the editors because the submissions are not appropriate for the journal (e.g., the submitted paper does not discuss any health policies).

=== Anonymous and attributed ===
For most scholarly publications, the identity of the reviewers is kept anonymised (also called "blind peer review"). The alternative, attributed peer review involves revealing the identities of the reviewers. Some reviewers choose to waive their right to anonymity, even when the journal's default format is blind peer review.

In anonymous peer review, reviewers are known to the journal editor or conference organiser but their names are not given to the article's author. In some cases, the author's identity can also be anonymised for the review process, with identifying information stripped from the document before review. The system is intended to reduce or eliminate bias.

Some experts proposed blind review procedures for reviewing controversial research topics.

In double-blind peer review, which has been fashioned by sociology journals in the 1950s and remains more common in the social sciences and humanities than in the natural sciences, the identity of the authors is concealed from the reviewers ("blinded"), and vice versa, lest the knowledge of authorship or concern about disapprobation from the author bias their review. Critics of the double-blind review process point out that, despite any editorial effort to ensure anonymity, the process often fails to do so, since certain approaches, methods, writing styles, notations, etc., point to a certain group of people in a research stream, and even to a particular person.

In many fields of "big science", the publicly available operation schedules of major equipments, such as telescopes or synchrotrons, would make the authors' names obvious to anyone who would care to look them up. Proponents of double-blind review argue that it performs no worse than single-blind, and that it generates a perception of fairness and equality in academic funding and publishing. Single-blind review is strongly dependent upon the goodwill of the participants, but no more so than double-blind review with easily identified authors.

As an alternative to single-blind and double-blind review, authors and reviewers are encouraged to declare their conflicts of interest when the names of authors and sometimes reviewers are known to the other. When conflicts are reported, the conflicting reviewer can be prohibited from reviewing and discussing the manuscript, or his or her review can instead be interpreted with the reported conflict in mind; the latter option is more often adopted when the conflict of interest is mild, such as a previous professional connection or a distant family relation. The incentive for reviewers to declare their conflicts of interest is a matter of professional ethics and individual integrity. Even when the reviews are not public, they are still a matter of record and the reviewer's credibility depends upon how they represent themselves among their peers. Some software engineering journals, such as the IEEE Transactions on Software Engineering, use non-blind reviews with reporting to editors of conflicts of interest by both authors and reviewers.

A more rigorous standard of accountability is known as an audit. Because reviewers are not paid, they cannot be expected to put as much time and effort into a review as an audit requires. Therefore, academic journals such as Science, organizations such as the American Geophysical Union, and agencies such as the National Institutes of Health and the National Science Foundation maintain and archive scientific data and methods in the event another researcher wishes to replicate or audit the research after publication.

The traditional anonymous peer review has been criticized for its lack of accountability, the possibility of abuse by reviewers or by those who manage the peer review process (that is, journal editors), its possible bias, and its inconsistency, alongside other flaws. Eugene Koonin, a senior investigator at the National Center for Biotechnology Information, asserts that the system has "well-known ills" and advocates "open peer review".

=== Open peer review ===
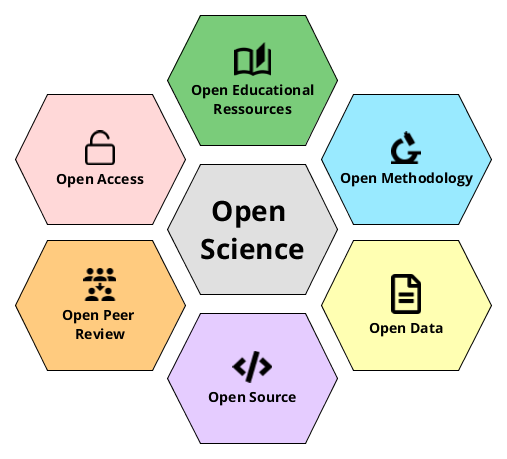

Open peer review is the various possible modifications of the traditional scholarly peer review process. The three most common modifications to which the term is applied are:

1. Open identities: Authors and reviewers are aware of each other's identity.
2. Open reports: Review reports are published alongside the relevant article (rather than being kept confidential).
3. Open participation: The wider community (and not just invited reviewers) are able to contribute to the review process.

These modifications are supposed to address various perceived shortcomings of the traditional scholarly peer review process, in particular its lack of transparency, lack of incentives, wastefulness, bullying and harassment.

=== Transparent peer review ===
In transparent peer review the documents relating to the publication of the paper are published alongside the paper. This includes the initial report made by the peer reviewer, the authors' response to it, and the acceptance letter by the editor. The names of the reviewers may still be kept anonymous even in transparent peer review.

=== Pre- and post-publication peer review ===
The process of peer review is not restricted to the publication process managed by academic journals. In particular, some forms of peer review can occur before an article is submitted to a journal and/or after it is published by the journal.

==== Pre-publication peer review ====
Manuscripts are typically reviewed by colleagues before submission, and if the manuscript is uploaded to preprint servers, such as ArXiv, BioRxiv or SSRN, researchers can read and comment on the manuscript. The practice to upload to preprint servers, and the activity of discussion heavily depend on the field, and it allows an open pre-publication peer review. The advantage of this method is speed and transparency of the review process. Anyone can give feedback, typically in form of comments, and typically not anonymously. These comments are also public, and can be responded to, therefore author-reviewer communication is not restricted to the typical 2–4 rounds of exchanges in traditional publishing. The authors can incorporate comments from a wide range of people instead of feedback from the typically 3–4 reviewers. The disadvantage is that a far larger number of papers are presented to the community without any guarantee on quality.

==== Post-publication peer review ====
After a manuscript is published, the process of peer review continues as publications are read, known as post-publication peer review. Readers will often send letters to the editor of a journal, or correspond with the editor via an on-line journal club. In this way, all "peers" may offer review and critique of published literature. The introduction of the "epub ahead of print" practice in many journals has made possible the simultaneous publication of unsolicited letters to the editor together with the original paper in the print issue.

A variation on this theme is open peer commentary, in which commentaries from specialists are solicited on published articles and the authors are invited to respond. Journals using this process solicit and publish non-anonymous commentaries on the "target paper" together with the paper, and with original authors' reply as a matter of course. Open peer commentary was first implemented by the anthropologist Sol Tax, who founded the journal Current Anthropology in 1957. The journal Behavioral and Brain Sciences, published by Cambridge University Press, was founded by Stevan Harnad in 1978 and modeled on Current Anthropology's open peer commentary feature. Psycoloquy (1990–2002) was based on the same feature, but this time implemented online. Since 2016 open peer commentary is also provided by the journal Animal Sentience.

In addition to journals hosting their own articles' reviews, there are also external, independent websites dedicated to post-publication peer-review, such as PubPeer which allows anonymous commenting of published literature and pushes authors to answer these comments. It has been suggested that post-publication reviews from these sites should be editorially considered as well. The megajournals F1000Research and ScienceOpen publish openly both the identity of the reviewers and the reviewer's report alongside the article.

Some journals use post-publication peer review as formal review method, instead of pre-publication review. This was first introduced in 2001, by Atmospheric Chemistry and Physics (ACP). More recently F1000Research, Qeios, and ScienceOpen were launched as megajournals with post-publication review as formal review method. At ACP, F1000Research, and Qeios peer reviewers are formally invited, much like at pre-publication review journals. Articles that pass peer review at those three journals are included in external scholarly databases.

==== Social media and informal peer review ====
Recent research has called attention to the use of social media technologies and science blogs as a means of informal, post-publication peer review, as in the case of the #arseniclife (or GFAJ-1) controversy. In December 2010, an article published in Scienceexpress (the ahead-of-print version of Science) generated both excitement and skepticism, as its authors – led by NASA astrobiologist Felisa Wolfe-Simon – claimed to have discovered and cultured a certain bacteria that could replace phosphorus with arsenic in its physiological building blocks. At the time of the article's publication, NASA issued press statements suggesting that the finding would impact the search for extraterrestrial life, sparking excitement on Twitter under the hashtag #arseniclife, as well as criticism from fellow experts who voiced skepticism via their personal blogs. Ultimately, the controversy surrounding the article attracted media attention, and one of the most vocal scientific critics – Rosemary Redfield – formally published in July 2012 regarding her and her colleagues' unsuccessful attempt to replicate the NASA scientists' original findings.

Researchers following the impact of the #arseniclife case on social media discussions and peer review processes concluded the following:

Our results indicate that interactive online communication technologies can enable members in the broader scientific community to perform the role of journal reviewers to legitimize scientific information after it has advanced through formal review channels. In addition, a variety of audiences can attend to scientific controversies through these technologies and observe an informal process of post-publication peer review. (p 946)

=== Result-blind peer review ===
Studies which report a positive or statistically significant result are far more likely to be published than ones which do not. A counter-measure to this positivity bias is to hide or make unavailable the results in the paper, making journal acceptance more like scientific grant agencies reviewing research proposals. Versions include:

1. Result-blind peer review or results blind peer review, first proposed 1966: Reviewers receive an edited version of the submitted paper which omits the results and conclusion section. In a two-stage version, a second round of reviews or editorial judgment is based on the full paper version, which was first proposed in 1977.
  Conclusion-blind review, proposed by Robin Hanson in 2007 extends this further asking all authors to submit a positive and a negative version, and only after the journal has accepted the article authors reveal which is the real version.
2. Pre-accepted articles or outcome-unbiased journals or advance publication review or registered reports or prior to results submission or early acceptance extends study pre-registration to the point that journals accepted or reject papers based on the version of the paper written before the results or conclusions have been made (an enlarged study protocol), but instead describes the theoretical justification, experimental design, and statistical analysis. Only once the proposed hypothesis and methodology have been accepted by reviewers, the authors would collect the data or analyze previously collected data. A limited variant of a pre-accepted article was The Lancet's study protocol review from 1997 to 2015 reviewed and published randomized trial protocols with a guarantee that the eventual paper would at least be sent out to peer review rather than immediately rejected. For example, Nature Human Behaviour has adopted the registered report format, as it "shift[s] the emphasis from the results of research to the questions that guide the research and the methods used to answer them". The European Journal of Personality defines this format: "In a registered report, authors create a study proposal that includes theoretical and empirical background, research questions/hypotheses, and pilot data (if available). Upon submission, this proposal will then be reviewed prior to data collection, and if accepted, the paper resulting from this peer-reviewed procedure will be published, regardless of the study outcomes." An analysis of almost 100 preregistered studies showed that registered reports adhered to an average of 92% of their preregistrations, but unreviewed preregistrations adhered only to 60%. These findings suggest that when the initial study plan is accepted for publication, there may be a reduced incentive to change preregistered plans.

The following journals used result-blind peer review or pre-accepted articles:

- The European Journal of Parapsychology, under Martin Johnson (who proposed a version of Registered Reports in 1974), began accepting papers based on submitted designs and then publishing them, from 1976 to 1993, and published 25 RRs total
- The International Journal of Forecasting used opt-in result-blind peer review and pre-accepted articles from before 1986 through 1996/1997.
- The journal Applied Psychological Measurement offered an opt-in "advance publication review" process from 1989 to 1996, ending use after only 5 papers were submitted.
- The JAMA Internal Medicine found in a 2009 survey that 86% of its reviewers would be willing to work in a result-blind peer review process, and ran a pilot experiment with a two-stage result-blind peer review, showing the unblinded step benefited positive studies more than negatives. but the journal does not currently use result-blind peer review.
- The Center for Open Science encourages using "Registered Reports" (pre-accepted articles) beginning in 2013. As of October 2017, ~80 journals offer Registered Reports in general, have had special issues of Registered Reports, or limited acceptance of Registered Reports (e.g. replications only) including AIMS Neuroscience, Cortex, Perspectives on Psychological Science, Social Psychology, & Comparative Political Studies
  - Comparative Political Studies published results of its pilot experiment of 19 submissions of which 3 were pre-accepted in 2016. the process worked well but submissions were weighted towards quantitative experimental designs, and reduced the amount of 'fishing' as submitters and reviewers focused on theoretical backing, substantive importance of results, with attention to the statistical power and implications of a null result, concluding that "we can clearly state that this form of review lead to papers that were of the highest quality. We would love to see a top journal adopt results-free review as a policy, at very least allowing results-free review as one among several standard submission options."

=== Extended peer review ===
Extended peer review is the process of including people and groups with experience beyond that of working academics in the processes of assuring the quality of research. If conducted systematically, this can lead to more reliable, or applicable, results than a peer review process conducted purely by academics.

== Criticism ==
Scholarly peer review has been subject to several criticisms, and various proposals for reforming the system have been suggested over the years. Many studies have emphasized the problems inherent to the process of peer review. Moreover, Ragone et al. have shown that there is a low correlation between peer review outcomes and the future impact measured by citations.

Various biomedical editors in particular have expressed criticism of peer review. A Cochrane review found little empirical evidence that peer review ensures quality in biomedical research, while a second systematic review and meta-analysis found a need for evidence-based peer review in biomedicine given the paucity of assessment of the interventions designed to improve the process.

To an outsider, the anonymous, pre-publication peer review process is opaque. Certain journals are accused of not carrying out stringent peer review in order to more easily expand their customer base, particularly in journals where authors pay a fee before publication. Richard Smith, MD, former editor of the British Medical Journal, has claimed that peer review is "ineffective, largely a lottery, anti-innovatory, slow, expensive, wasteful of scientific time, inefficient, easily abused, prone to bias, unable to detect fraud and irrelevant; Several studies have shown that peer review is biased against the provincial and those from low- and middle-income countries; Many journals take months and even years to publish and the process wastes researchers' time. As for the cost, the Research Information Network estimated the global cost of peer review at £1.9 billion in 2008."

Brezis and Birukou have further argued that that the process is weakened by the fact that reviewers are not investing the same amount of time to analyze the projects. This heterogeneity among referees, the two argue, will lead to seriously affect the whole peer review process, and will lead to main arbitrariness in the results of the process.

A 2024 review focused on economics identified several recurring concerns in the field's peer-review process, including referee overreach, strategic refereeing and conflicts of interest, prestige bias, and noisy review outcomes.

In addition, Australia's Innovative Research Universities group (a coalition of seven comprehensive universities committed to inclusive excellence in teaching, learning and research in Australia) has found that "peer review disadvantages researchers in their early careers, when they rely on competitive grants to cover their salaries, and when unsuccessful funding applications often mark the end of a research idea".

Peer review publication is a common requirement for academic tenure. This requirement has been criticised on cultural grounds. In 2011, University of British Columbia assistant law professor, Lorna McCue, argued that emphasis on peer review publication was culturally inappropriate as it did not recognize the importance of Indigenous oral traditions. In 2018, the British Columbia Human Rights Tribunal found that this complaint was not justified .

There is an ongoing discussion about a peer-review crisis. In 2022 Inside Higher Ed reported a serious shortage of scholars to review submitted articles and bigger structural problems amplified by the COVID-19 pandemic.

=== Tendency to discourage innovative projects ===
Brezis and Birukou have argued that a major issues in the peer process is that referees display homophily in their taste and perception of innovative ideas. This means that reviewers who are developing conventional ideas tend to give low grades to more innovative projects, while reviewers who develop innovative ideas tend, by homophily, to give higher grades to innovative projects.

Similarly, peer review is more problematic when choosing the projects to be funded since innovative projects are not highly ranked in the existing peer-review process. The peer-review process leads to conformity, i.e., the selection of less controversial projects and papers. This may even influence the type of proposals scholars will propose, since scholars need to find financing for their research as discussed by Martin, 1997: "A common informal view is that it is easier to obtain funds for conventional projects. Those who are eager to get funding are not likely to propose radical or unorthodox projects. Since you don't know who the referees are going to be, it is best to assume that they are middle-of-the-road. Therefore, the middle-of-the-road application is safer".

=== Peer review and trust ===
Researchers have peer-reviewed manuscripts prior to publishing them in a variety of ways since the 18th century. The main goal of this practice is to improve the relevance and accuracy of scientific discussions. Even though experts often criticize peer review for a number of reasons, the process is still often considered the "gold standard" of science. Occasionally however, peer review approves studies that are later found to be wrong and rarely deceptive or fraudulent results are discovered prior to publication. Thus, there seems to be an element of discord between the ideology behind and the practice of peer review. By failing to effectively communicate that peer review is imperfect, the message conveyed to the wider public is that studies published in peer-reviewed journals are "true" and that peer review protects the literature from flawed science. A number of well-established criticisms exist of many elements of peer review. In the following we describe cases of the wider impact inappropriate peer review can have on public understanding of scientific literature.

Multiple examples across several areas of science find that scientists elevated the importance of peer review for research that was questionable or corrupted. For example, climate change deniers have published studies in the Energy and Environment journal, attempting to undermine the body of research that shows how human activity impacts the Earth's climate. Politicians in the United States who reject the established science of climate change have then cited this journal on several occasions in speeches and reports.

At times, peer review has been exposed as a process that was orchestrated for a preconceived outcome. The New York Times gained access to confidential peer review documents for studies sponsored by the National Football League (NFL) that were cited as scientific evidence that brain injuries do not cause long-term harm to its players. During the peer review process, the authors of the study stated that all NFL players were part of a study, a claim that the reporters found to be false by examining the database used for the research. Furthermore, The Times noted that the NFL sought to legitimize the studies" methods and conclusion by citing a "rigorous, confidential peer-review process" despite evidence that some peer reviewers seemed "desperate" to stop their publication. Recent research has also demonstrated that widespread industry funding for published medical research often goes undeclared and that such conflicts of interest are not appropriately addressed by peer review. Conflict of interest is less likely to be picked up in double-blinded reviews since the reviewer does not know the identity of the authors.

Another problem that peer review fails to catch is ghostwriting, a process by which companies draft articles for academics who then publish them in journals, sometimes with little or no changes. These studies can then be used for political, regulatory and marketing purposes. In 2010, the US Senate Finance Committee released a report that found this practice was widespread, that it corrupted the scientific literature and increased prescription rates. Ghostwritten articles have appeared in dozens of journals, involving professors at several universities.

Just as experts in a particular field have a better understanding of the value of papers published in their area, scientists are considered to have better grasp of the value of published papers than the general public and to see peer review as a human process, with human failings, and that "despite its limitations, we need it. It is all we have, and it is hard to imagine how we would get along without it". But these subtleties are lost on the general public, who are often misled into thinking that being published in a journal with peer review is the "gold standard" and can erroneously equate published research with the truth. Thus, more care must be taken over how peer review, and the results of peer-reviewed research, are communicated to non-specialist audiences; particularly during a time in which a range of technical changes and a deeper appreciation of the complexities of peer review are emerging. This will be needed as the scholarly publishing system has to confront wider issues such as retractions and replication or reproducibility "crises".

=== Views of peer review ===
Peer review is often considered integral to scientific discourse in one form or another. Its gatekeeping role is supposed to be necessary to maintain the quality of the scientific literature and avoid a risk of unreliable results, inability to separate signal from noise, and slow scientific progress. Although pre-publication peer review plays a pivotal role in strengthening the quality standards of scholarly literature, the contributions of peer reviewers remain significantly under-recognized. Therefore, there have been suggestions that reviewers receive greater formal credit to acknowledge their central role in improving quality of published literature.

Shortcomings of peer review have been met with calls for even stronger filtering and more gatekeeping. A common argument in favor of such initiatives is the belief that this filter is needed to maintain the integrity of the scientific literature.

Calls for more oversight have at least two implications that are counterintuitive of what is known to be true scholarship.

1. The belief that scholars are incapable of evaluating the quality of work on their own, that they are in need of a gatekeeper to inform them of what is good and what is not.
2. The belief that scholars need a "guardian" to make sure they are doing good work.

Others argue that authors most of all have a vested interest in the quality of a particular piece of work. Only the authors could have, as Feynman (1974) puts it, the "extra type of integrity that is beyond not lying, but bending over backwards to show how you're maybe wrong, that you ought to have when acting as a scientist." If anything, the current peer review process and academic system could penalize, or at least fail to incentivize, such integrity.

Instead, the credibility conferred by the "peer-reviewed" label could diminish what Feynman calls the culture of doubt necessary for science to operate a self-correcting, truth-seeking process. The effects of this can be seen in the ongoing replication crisis, hoaxes, and widespread outrage over the inefficacy of the current system. It's common to think that more oversight is the answer, as peer reviewers are not at all lacking in skepticism. But the issue is not the skepticism shared by the select few who determine whether an article passes through the filter. It is the validation, and accompanying lack of skepticism, that comes afterwards. Here again more oversight only adds to the impression that peer review ensures quality, thereby further diminishing the culture of doubt and counteracting the spirit of scientific inquiry.

Quality research predates peer review . Though in its initial conception it was often a laborious and time-consuming task, researchers took peer review on nonetheless, not out of obligation but out of duty to uphold the integrity of their own scholarship. They managed to do so, for the most part, without the aid of centralised journals, editors, or any formalised or institutionalised process whatsoever. Supporters of this early approach to review argue that modern technology makes it possible to renew the practice as it enables rapid global communication among researchers to better clarify, understand, and communicate their scholarly work.

Such modern technology includes posting results to preprint servers, preregistration of studies, open peer review, and other open science practices. In all these initiatives, the role of gatekeeping remains prominent, as if a necessary feature of all scholarly communication, but critics argue that a proper, real-world implementation could test and disprove this assumption; demonstrate researchers' desire for more that traditional journals can offer; show that researchers can be entrusted to perform their own quality control independent of journal-coupled review. Jon Tennant also argues that the outcry over the inefficiencies of traditional journals centers on their inability to provide rigorous enough scrutiny, and the outsourcing of critical thinking to a concealed and poorly-understood process. Thus, the assumption that journals and peer review are required to protect scientific integrity seems to undermine the very foundations of scholarly inquiry.

To test the hypothesis that filtering is indeed unnecessary to quality control, many of the traditional publication practices would need to be redesigned, editorial boards repurposed if not disbanded, and authors granted control over the peer review of their own work. Putting authors in charge of their own peer review is seen as serving a dual purpose. On one hand, it removes the conferral of quality within the traditional system, thus eliminating the prestige associated with the simple act of publishing. Perhaps paradoxically, the removal of this barrier might actually result in an increase of the quality of published work, as it eliminates the cachet of publishing for its own sake. On the other hand, readers know that there is no filter so they must interpret anything they read with a healthy dose of skepticism, thereby naturally restoring the culture of doubt to scientific practice.

In addition to concerns about the quality of work produced by well-meaning researchers, there are concerns that a truly open system would allow the literature to be populated with junk and propaganda by those with a vested interest in certain issues. A counterargument is that the conventional model of peer review diminishes the healthy skepticism that is a hallmark of scientific inquiry, and thus confers credibility upon subversive attempts to infiltrate the literature. Allowing such "junk" to be published could make individual articles less reliable but render the overall literature more robust by fostering a "culture of doubt".

=== Allegations of bias and suppression ===
The interposition of editors and reviewers between authors and readers may enable the intermediators to act as gatekeepers. Some sociologists of science argue that peer review makes the ability to publish susceptible to control by elites and to personal jealousy. The peer review process may sometimes impede progress and may be biased against novelty. A linguistic analysis of review reports suggests that reviewers focus on rejecting the applications by searching for weak points, and not on finding the high-risk/high-gain groundbreaking ideas that may be in the proposal. Reviewers tend to be especially critical of conclusions that contradict their own views, and lenient towards those that match them. At the same time, established scientists are more likely than others to be sought out as referees, particularly by high-prestige journals/publishers. As a result, ideas that harmonize with the established experts' are more likely to see print and to appear in premier journals than are iconoclastic or revolutionary ones. This accords with Thomas Kuhn's well-known observations regarding scientific revolutions. A theoretical model has been established whose simulations imply that peer review and over-competitive research funding foster mainstream opinion to monopoly.

Criticisms of traditional anonymous peer review allege that it lacks accountability, can lead to abuse by reviewers, and may be biased and inconsistent.

There have also been suggestions of gender bias in peer review, with male authors being likely to receive more favorable treatment. A 2021 study found in some respects bias in favor of female authors and found no evidence for bias in favor of male authors.

Political bias can be found in reviewer evaluations.

=== Exploitation of free work ===
Most academic publishers do not financially compensate reviewers for their participation in the peer-review process, which has been criticized by the academic community. Whereas some publishers have contended that it is economically not feasible to pay reviewers, some journals have started to pay reviewers through platforms such as Research Square when they are unable to receive free reviews. Other publishers such as Advances.in have made paying reviewers an inherent part of their business model.

=== Open access journals and peer review ===
Some critics of open access (OA) journals have argued that, compared to traditional subscription journals, open access journals might utilize substandard or less formal peer review practices, and, as a consequence, the quality of scientific work in such journals will suffer. In a study published in 2012, this hypothesis was tested by evaluating the relative "impact" (using citation counts) of articles published in open access and subscription journals, on the grounds that members of the scientific community would presumably be less likely to cite substandard work, and that citation counts could therefore act as one indicator of whether or not the journal format indeed impacted peer review and the quality of published scholarship. This study ultimately concluded that "OA journals indexed in Web of Science and/or Scopus are approaching the same scientific impact and quality as subscription journals, particularly in biomedicine and for journals funded by article processing charges," and the authors consequently argue that "there is no reason for authors not to choose to publish in OA journals just because of the 'OA' label.

=== Failures ===
Peer review fails when a peer-reviewed article contains fundamental errors that undermine at least one of its main conclusions and that could have been identified by more careful reviewers. Many journals have no procedure to deal with peer review failures beyond publishing letters to the editor. Peer review in scientific journals assumes that the article reviewed has been honestly prepared. The process occasionally detects fraud, but is not designed to do so. When peer review fails and a paper is published with fraudulent or otherwise irreproducible data, the paper may be retracted. A 1998 experiment on peer review with a fictitious manuscript found that peer reviewers failed to detect some manuscript errors and the majority of reviewers may not notice that the conclusions of the paper are unsupported by its results.

==== Fake peer review ====
There have been instances where peer review was claimed to be performed but in fact was not; this has been documented in some predatory open access journals (e.g., the "Who's Afraid of Peer Review?" affair) or in the case of sponsored Elsevier journals.

In November 2014, an article in Nature exposed that some academics were submitting fake contact details for recommended reviewers to journals, so that if the publisher contacted the recommended reviewer, they were the original author reviewing their own work under a fake name. The Committee on Publication Ethics issued a statement warning of the fraudulent practice. In March 2015, BioMed Central retracted 43 articles and Springer retracted 64 papers in 10 journals in August 2015. Tumor Biology journal is another example of peer review fraud.

In 2020, the Journal of Nanoparticle Research fell victim to an "organized rogue editor network", who impersonated respected academics, got a themed issue created, and got 19 substandard articles published (out of 80 submitted). The journal was praised for dealing with the scam openly and transparently.

In 2023, the journal Airbursts and Cratering Impacts was founded by members of the Comet Research Group to publish "cutting-edge, impact-related investigations" that among other things, according to its web page, "have been rejected by other journals". It has been described as a "vanity journal", where authors "self-edit, self-review and republish versions of their own retracted papers and manuscripts that have repeatedly been rejected by legitimate journals".

==== Plagiarism ====
Reviewers generally lack access to raw data, but do see the full text of the manuscript, and are typically familiar with recent publications in the area. Thus, they are in a better position to detect plagiarism of prose than fraudulent data. A few cases of such textual plagiarism by historians, for instance, have been widely publicized.

On the scientific side, a poll of 3,247 scientists funded by the U.S. National Institutes of Health found 0.3% admitted faking data and 1.4% admitted plagiarism. Additionally, 4.7% of the same poll admitted to self-plagiarism or autoplagiarism, in which an author republishes the same material, data, or text, without citing their earlier work. Self-plagiarisms are less likely to be detected in double-blinded peer reviews.

==== Examples ====
- "Perhaps the most widely recognized failure of peer review is its inability to ensure the identification of high-quality work. The list of important scientific papers that were rejected by some peer-reviewed journals goes back at least as far as the editor of Philosophical Transaction's 1796 rejection of Edward Jenner's report of the first vaccination against smallpox."
- The Soon and Baliunas controversy involved the publication in 2003 of a review study written by aerospace engineer Willie Soon and astronomer Sallie Baliunas in the journal Climate Research, which was quickly taken up by the G.W. Bush administration as a basis for amending the first Environmental Protection Agency Report on the Environment. The paper was strongly criticized by numerous scientists for its methodology and for its misuse of data from previously published studies, prompting concerns about the peer review process of the paper. The controversy resulted in the resignation of several editors of the journal and the admission by its publisher Otto Kinne that the paper should not have been published as it was.
- The trapezoidal rule, in which the method of Riemann sums for numerical integration was republished as "Tai's model" in a Diabetes research journal, Diabetes Care. The method is almost always taught in high school calculus, and was thus considered an example of an extremely well known idea being re-branded as a new discovery.
- A conference organized by the Wessex Institute of Technology was the target of an exposé by three researchers who wrote nonsensical papers (including one that was composed of random phrases). They reported that the papers were "reviewed and provisionally accepted" and concluded that the conference was an attempt to "sell" publication possibilities to less experienced or naive researchers. This may however be better described as a lack of any actual peer review, rather than peer review having failed.
- In the humanities, one of the most infamous cases of plagiarism undetected by peer review involved Martin Stone, formerly professor of medieval and Renaissance philosophy at the Hoger Instituut voor Wijsbegeerte of the KU Leuven. Martin Stone managed to publish at least forty articles and book chapters that were almost entirely stolen from the work of others. Most of these publications appeared in highly rated peer-reviewed journals and book series.
- The controversial Younger Dryas impact hypothesis, which evolved directly from pseudoscience and now forms the basis for the pseudoarchaeology of Graham Hancock's Ancient Apocalypse, was first published in the peer-reviewed journal PNAS using a nonstandard review system, according to a comprehensive refutation by Holliday et al. (2023). According to this 2023 review, "Claiming evidence where none exists and providing misleading citations may be accidental, but when conducted repeatedly, it becomes negligent and undermines scientific advancement as well as the credibility of science itself. Also culpable is the failure of the peer review process to prevent such errors of fact from entering the literature. The Proceedings of the National Academy of Sciences 'contributed review' system for National Academy members...is at least partially responsible. The 'pal reviews' (as some refer to them) were significantly curtailed in 2010, in part due to the YDIH controversy."

=== Proposed alternatives ===
Other attempts to reform the peer review process originate among others from the fields of metascience and journalology. Reformers seek to increase the reliability and efficiency of the peer review process and to provide it with a scientific foundation. Alternatives to common peer review practices have been put to the test, in particular open peer review, where the comments are visible to readers, generally with the identities of the peer reviewers disclosed as well, e.g., F1000, eLife, BMJ, and BioMed Central. In the case of eLife, peer review is used not for deciding whether to publish an article, but for assessing its importance and reliability. Likewise, the recognition and recruitment of peer reviewers continues to be a significant issue in the field of scholarly publishing.

== In popular culture ==
In 2017, the Higher School of Economics in Moscow unveiled a "Monument to an Anonymous Peer Reviewer". It takes the form of a large concrete cube, or dice, with "Accept", "Minor Changes", "Major Changes", "Revise and Resubmit" and "Reject" on its five visible sides. Sociologist Igor Chirikov, who devised the monument, said that while researchers have a love-hate relationship with peer review, peer reviewers nonetheless do valuable but mostly invisible work, and the monument is a tribute to them.

== See also ==
- Academic authorship
- Academic bias
- Academic journal
- Abstract management
- Conference proceedings
- Coercive citation
- Grievance studies affair
- Interdisciplinary peer review
- Journal club
- Publication bias
- Reporting bias
- Scholarly method
- Sternberg peer review controversy
- Statcheck
