= JournalReview.org =

JournalReview.org was an online interdisciplinary journal club. It hosted an international community of doctors and existed for the purpose of facilitating critical discussion and post-publication peer review of all medical literature indexed by the National Library of Medicine in PubMed. It was part of the movement towards open peer review, telemedicine, and self-archiving/open access.

== Contents ==
It was web-based and consisted of commentary and discussion related to published medical literature.

Members could participate individually, or by creating their own "journal clubs" – collections of members who were actively participating in discussion of mutual interest. Some residency training programs adopted this resource to meet ACGME requirements. Members utilized this resource to suggest future research, and to identify bias or limitations to published work. Educators utilized this resource to help stimulate and document critical discussion of assigned journal articles. Authors utilized this resource to answer questions about and provide supplement to their published work. This resource was also utilized by the public as a vehicle to better understand published trade literature.

Members consists of all the major specialties as well areas of basic science. Approximately 7,000 doctors, health care professionals, researchers, residency training programs, and students from all over the world participate. It was listed as a recommended resources by the New York Public Library, the Dalhousie University College of Pharmacy, the State University of New York Downstate Medical Library, as well as several other related websites.

== See also ==
- Peerage of Science
- Publons
- PubPeer
