= Scholastica (disambiguation) =

Scholastica is a Catholic saint.

Scholastica may also refer to:

- Scholastica (company), a web-based software platform for managing academic journals
- Scholastica Kimaryo, Tanzanian international civil servant and journalist
- Scholastica of Saxe-Wittenberg, a German noblewoman
- Scholastique of Champagne, a French noblewoman

== Schools ==
- Scholastica (school), a private English medium school in Dhaka, Bangladesh
- The College of St. Scholastica, in Duluth, Minnesota, US
- St Scholastica's College (Australia), in Sydney, Australia
- St. Scholastica's College Manila, Philippines
- Several schools named St. Scholastica Academy (disambiguation)

== Places ==
- Abbaye Sainte-Scholastique in Dourgne, France
- Sainte-Scholastique, Quebec in Canada

== See also ==
- Scholastic (disambiguation)
