= Anonymous peer review =

Anonymous peer review may refer to:

- An anonymous scholarly peer review (as opposed to an open one)
- Any form of peer review that has some form of anonymity
