= The Winnower =

The Winnower was a publishing platform and journal that offered traditional scholarly publishing tools (Digital Object Identifiers (DOIs), permanent archival, Altmetrics, PDF creation, etc.) to enable rigorous scholastic discussion of topics across all areas of intellectual inquiry, whether in the sciences, humanities, public policy, or otherwise. Between 2014 and 2016, The Winnower published and archived the following:

- Student Essays
- Conference Proceedings
- Peer Reviews
- Theses
- Grants
- Book Reviews
- Journal Clubs
- How-to's
- Lab notes
- Scholarly reddit AMAs
- Foldscope Images
- Blog posts
- Original research
- Open Letters.

== History ==
The Winnower was founded by Dr. Joshua Nicholson. It went live on May 27, 2014, with a primary focus of publishing scientific research, but expanded its scope to include a diverse set of topics spanning the humanities, social sciences, science policy, and professional commentaries, to name just a few. As of April 2016 it had over 1,000 publications from 4,500+ authors around the world.

In November 2016, it was announced that the publishing platform Authorea had bought The Winnower. New submissions were then stopped, with the site directing authors to Authorea. The site has been largely inactive but archived since 2016. Authorea was in turn purchased by one of the 'big 5' academic publishers, Wiley, in 2018.

== Post-publication Peer Review ==
The Winnower offered post-publication peer review. After submission, the paper was immediately made visible online, and was open for public, non-anonymous reviews by registered members of The Winnower community. Articles could be revised indefinitely until the author chose to "freeze" a final version and purchase a digital object identifier.

== See also ==
- Authorea
- Scholarly peer review
- F1000Research
- Journal club
- Conference Proceedings
