= Open Rev. =

- Website type: Social software for academic research
- Available in: English
- Creators: Erik Bauch and Georg Kucsko
- Website: openrev.org
- Launched: Aug 2014
- Content license: Attribution Share-Alike Unported

Open Rev. is a web-based platform for open discussion and annotation of research publications and related material.

Researchers can comment directly on text, formulas, and images in research papers, post related questions and answer questions posed by each other. Open Rev's web-based PDF viewer allows public discussion and open peer review of scientific publications. User contributions are licensed under Creative Commons Attribution-ShareAlike 3.0 Unported.

Open Rev. was a participant of the Harvard i-Lab Venture Incubation Program 2014 and has won awards from the Harvard Institute for Learning and Teaching and Education Innovation Pitch Competition.

== History ==
Open Rev. was created by Erik Bauch and Georg Kucsko, PhD candidates in the Harvard Physics program. It officially launched in 2014. As of 2015, the user base had risen to over 1000 participants and included institutions such as Harvard, MIT, Northeastern University, Royal Holloway University of London, and Uppsala Universitet.

== Media ==
Open Rev. has been featured in Harvard Physics, the Harvard Gazette and the Harvard alumni magazine, Colloquy. In an interview in Colloquy, co- Bauch explained,

“Up until now scientific discussions usually occurred at conferences, in journal club, or in hallways on the way to lunch. With Open Rev. we are trying to motivate people to take some of these discussions online and share their knowledge with the whole scientific community.”

== Features ==
- public commenting and Q&A on PDF papers
- private groups with tagging and discussions
- public groups to share papers by topic
- web-based PDF viewer with PDF search capability
- rate papers, comments and replies
- Latex and Markdown support
- picture upload
- anonymous commenting
- automatic extraction of metadata from PDFs
- tagging of PDFs
- import papers from arXiv
