= Brezis =

Brezis is a surname. Notable people with the surname include:

- Elise Brezis, French-Israeli economist, professor of Economics at Bar-Ilan University
- Haïm Brezis (1944–2024), French mathematician
