= Meta-functional expertise =

Breadth of one's strategically important knowledge

Meta-functional expertise is the breadth of one’s strategically important knowledge. It differs from the traditional conceptualization of expertise, which is generally considered to be a great depth of knowledge in a defined area, and where thus experts are people who are distinguished as knowing a lot about a particular subject. Comparatively, a meta-functional expert is considered to be somewhat knowledgeable in many different areas but not necessarily an expert in any single domain.

== Compared to generalists ==
Someone high on meta-functional expertise is similar to a generalist in that they have a wide array of knowledge. However, where generalists know many different things meta-functional experts have enough depth of knowledge in each area to be considered knowledgeable by other members of their team at work.

== Results of meta-functional expertise ==
Individuals high on meta-functional expertise are:

- Better able to acquire social power at work because they can translate between specialists.
- More successful as entrepreneurs
- More innovative
- More likely to get promoted at work
- Better able to get information from people outside of their work team

Groups with more meta-functional experts on them perform better because they:

- Communicate better with one another and share more ideas
- Understand their surroundings better
- Gain knowledge external to the group more efficiently
- Are more innovative

== See also ==
- Interdisciplinarity, utilization of specialist knowledge from several areas to solve a problem
- Interdiscipline, a discipline based on several disciplines, but which can also be considered an independent discipline
