= Interdisciplinary peer review =

Interdisciplinary Peer Review (IPR) is a peer review process with an additional focus outside of the area of the author's subject of expertise. Disciplines such as telecommunications, political science, engineering, and medicine require specific subject matter expertise, however, they still cross multiple disciplines and may require review from many alternate functional areas to achieve maximum perspective to prevent duplication or improper publication. Reviews of this nature may also cross cultures, race, and other demographics to gain perspective.

== Reduplication and Interdisciplinarity ==
In Peer Commentary on Peer Review: A case study in scientific quality control, Stevan R. Harnard (p. 15) begins to touch on the concept by addressing how well the review process works and what factors prevent re-duplication. Julie Klein, a professor of interdisciplinary studies at Wayne State University, defined interdisciplinarity as "new divisions of intellectual labor, collaborative research, team teaching, hybrid fields, comparative studies, increased borrowing across disciplines, and a variety of unified, holistic perspectives that have created pressures upon traditional divisions of knowledge". Klein has also described how interdisciplinarity is used to "find answers to complex questions, address broad issues, explore disciplinary and professional relations, to solve problems beyond the scope of any one discipline, and to achieve unity of knowledge whether on a limited or grand scale".

== Differences ==
The difference between an Interdisciplinary Peer Review and Interdisciplinarity is that the peer group in Interdisciplinary Peer Review crosses social, economic, and educational groups. Access to the review process allows greater input from a wider array or potential researchers.

== Open Interdisciplinary Peer Review Via Social Networking ==
Open Interdisciplinary Peer Review via Social Networking –The nature and ease of social networking sites makes Interdisciplinary Peer Review a reality. The issue becomes the informality of the review. This informality makes the review more of an "Open Peer Review" rather than a formalized review. Surprisingly in Encouraging Formative Peer Review Via Social Networking Sites, Bassford (E.67) finds that a high percentage of student's feel social networking is useful for enhancing learning, but only a small portion want to use it for such activities.

== Dilemma ==
Validation of information in an Open Interdisciplinary Peer Review is an ongoing or second Interdisciplinary Peer Review. Interdisciplinary Peer Review is a continual process of review. When publication is instant and prior to a review, the accuracy falls under scrutiny in the Open review nature of social media. The level of accuracy potentially becomes more variable as the non peer group dissemination increases.
