= Hugh de Wardener =

British doctor

CBE FRCP Hugh de Wardener
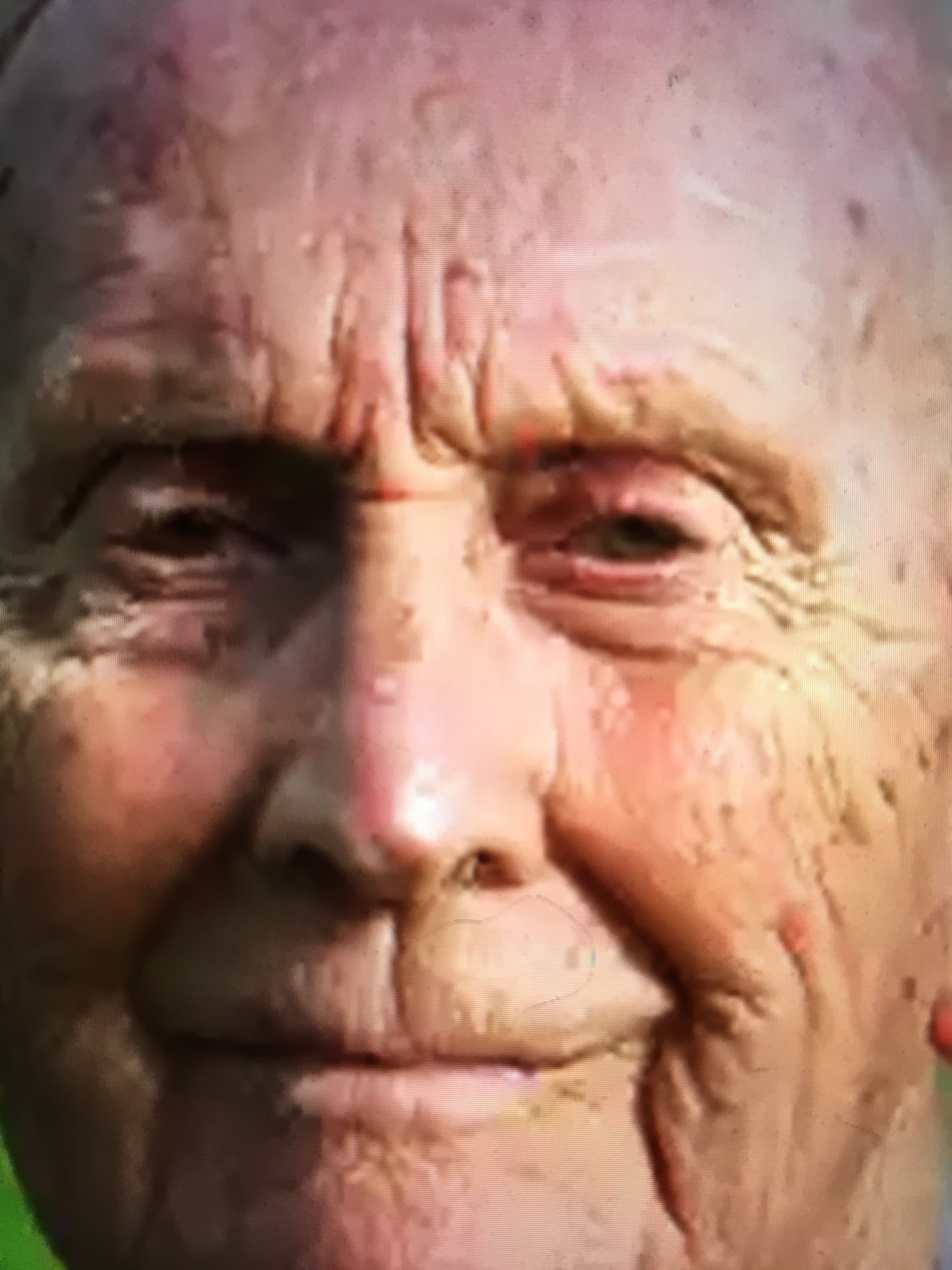
- Born: 8 October 1915; Paris, France
- Died: 29 September 2013 (aged 97); London, England
- Education: Malvern College; St Thomas's Hospital Medical School
- Medical career
- Profession: Doctor

Hugh Edward de Wardener CBE FRCP (8 October 1915 – 29 September 2013) was a British medical doctor who was an expert in the treatment of kidney disease. He was a pioneer of dialysis treatment and the first doctor in the United Kingdom to perform renal biopsies.

== Biography ==
Educated at Malvern College and St. Thomas' Medical School, he worked at a hospital until the outbreak of World War II. He joined the Royal Army Medical Corps during the war and was posted to Singapore soon before its fall to the Japanese. He spent the rest of the war as a POW in the notorious Changi camp, during which time while treating fellow prisoners he established that beriberi is caused by a deficiency of Vitamin B1, not as was previously thought by excessive consumption of alcohol. He was awarded a military MBE in 1946.

He showed that salt raises blood pressure. In 1998, he co-authored Salt, Diet and Health with Graham MacGregor. The book documents scientific evidence of the negative health effects of excess salt that is added to processed foods and how excessive salt intake increases the occurrence of hypertension and increases the risk of heart attacks and strokes.

He was Professor of Medicine, University of London, Charing Cross Hospital, 1960–81, and subsequently emeritus professor. He was Honorary Consultant Physician to the Army, 1975–1980. He was appointed CBE on his retirement in 1982.

== Selected publications ==
- Salt, Diet and Health (with Graham MacGregor, 1998)
