= Journal of the Renin-Angiotensin-Aldosterone System =

- Discipline: Medical Sciences
- Language: English
- Edited by: Graham MacGregor

Publication details
- History: 2000–present
- Publisher: SAGE Publications
- Frequency: Quarterly
- Open access: yes
- Impact factor: 2.271 (2013)

Standard abbreviations
- ISO 4: J. Renin-Angiotensin-Aldosterone Syst.
- NLM: J Renin Angiotensin Aldosterone Syst

Indexing
- CODEN: JRAAAG
- ISSN: 1470-3203 (print); 1752-8976 (web)
- LCCN: 2001243059
- OCLC no.: 61677440

Links
- Journal homepage; Online access; Online archive

Journal of the Renin-Angiotensin-Aldosterone System is a peer-reviewed academic journal that publishes papers in the field of Peripheral Vascular Disease. The journal's editors are Graham MacGregor and Peter Sever. It has been in publication since 2000 and is currently published by SAGE Publications.

== Scope ==
Journal of the Renin-Angiotensin-Aldosterone System is a resource for biomedical professionals, including basic scientists and clinicians, primarily with an active interest in the renin-angiotensin-aldosterone system in humans and other mammals. The journal publishes original research and reviews on the normal and abnormal functions of the system. Journal of the Renin-Angiotensin-Aldosterone System also publishes research on other peptides, such as vasopressin, the natriuretic peptides and the kallikrein-kinin system.

== Abstracting and indexing ==
Journal of the Renin-Angiotensin-Aldosterone System is abstracted and indexed in, among other databases: SCOPUS, and the Social Sciences Citation Index. According to the Journal Citation Reports, its 2013 impact factor is 2.271.
