= Blood Pressure Association =

British charity providing support for high blood pressure

- Formation: 2001
- Founder: Graham MacGregor
- Chair: Pauline Swift
- Website: https://www.bloodpressureuk.org/

The Blood Pressure Association (or BPA) is a British charitable organisation, established in October 2000, that seeks to provide information and support to people with high blood pressure (also known as hypertension) and to educate the general public about the importance of blood pressure to health.

It is based at St George's Hospital in Tooting, London.

== Know Your Numbers ==
Every September, the association runs a blood pressure testing week as part of its Know Your Numbers campaign, where doctors, nurses, pharmacists and trainers offer free blood pressure tests in hospitals, pharmacies, health centres and shopping centres throughout the UK.

== History ==
The organization was founded in 2001 by Graham MacGregor.

Sir David Attenborough was appointed patron of the Association in May 2005.

== See also ==
- National Blood Service
