= Authorea =

Online collaborative writing tool and research publishing platform

- Website type: Preprint archive
- Owner: Wiley
- Website: authorea.com
- Commercial: Yes
- Launched: February 2013; 13 years ago
- Current status: Online

Authorea is a preprint archive owned by Wiley that allows researchers to post multi-disciplinary early view research as preprints. It was originally founded in 2013 as an online collaborative writing tool with online publishing and preprinting capabilities, and later expanded as a platform to host branded partner preprint archives, such as the Earth Space Science Open Archive and TechRxiv. Authorea has been owned by the commercial publishing company Wiley since 2018, originally through an acquisition by Atypon, and now exists as Wiley's own preprint archive following migration of the Authorea and all partner preprint archives to Wiley's own Research Exchange Preprints platform, launched in 2026.

== Overview ==
Authorea is part of the open science movement and supports open access publishing for academic research and free access to research data. Authorea allows authors to post multi-disciplinary early view research as preprints, and for researchers to find and view content for free.

Following re-platform to Research Exchange Preprints authors can post preprints to Authorea automatically as part of a submission to Wiley journal participating in Wiley's Under Review service.

The platform supports also the direct submission of content to a preprint archive, as well as the editing and re-posting of new preprint versions via the platform's content editor.

According to the notice on Authorea, Wiley have temporarily suspended direct submissions following the migration to Research Exchange Preprints in May 2026, in order to "assess new workflows, improve editorial and integrity screening processes, and upgrade user support".

== History ==
Authorea was launched in February 2013 by co-founders Alberto Pepe and Nathan Jenkins and scientific adviser Matteo Cantiello, who met while working at CERN. They recognized common difficulties in the scholarly writing and publishing process. To address these problems, Pepe and Jenkins developed an online, web-based editor to support real-time collaborative writing, and sharing and execution of research data and code. Jenkins finished the first prototype site build in less than three weeks.

Bootstrapping for almost two years, Pepe and Jenkins grew Authorea by reaching out to friends and colleagues, speaking at events and conferences, and partnering with early adopter institutions.

In September 2014, Authorea announced the successful closure of a $610K round of seed funding with the New York Angels and ff Venture Capital groups. In January 2016, Authorea closed a $1.6M round of funding led by Lux Capital and including the Knight Foundation and Bloomberg Beta. It later acquired the VC-backed company The Winnower.

In 2018 Authorea was acquired for an undisclosed amount by Atypon (part of Wiley).

Following Atypon/Wiley's acquisition, Authorea expanded its preprint archive and preprint workflow capabilities to support branded partner archives. First with the migration in 2022 of the Earth Space Science Open Archive, a joint venture between the American Geophysical Union (AGU) and Wiley, then later in 2023 with TechRxiv owned by the Institute of Electrical and Electronics Engineers (IEEE), and in 2024 with Sage Advance.

Growing from around 10,000 preprints in 2020 to over 100,000 preprints in 2024, Wiley took the decision to invest in the future of preprints with a major re-platform of all content to their new Research Exchange Preprints platform. Wiley now retain the Authorea brand as their own preprint archive, with all other partner archives separately managed on Research Exchange Preprints.

== Technical architecture ==
Authorea is hosted on Wiley's Research Exchange Preprints platform. The platform leverages Wiley's Atypon Experience Platform (formerly known as Literatum), a host of content of academic, scholarly and professional publishers.
