= Action on Sugar =

British health charity

- Formation: 2014
- Type: Charity
- Registration no.: 1098818
- Headquarters: London
- Region served: England
- Fields: Nutrition, Health
- Chairman: Prof. Graham MacGregor
- Website: www.actiononsugar.org

Action on Sugar is a registered UK charity formed in 2014 by a group of specialists concerned about sugar and its impact on health. Through research and lobbying the group works to highlight the harmful effects of a high sugar diet and desirability of reducing the amount of added sugar contained in processed foods.

Professor Graham MacGregor, a cardiologist at Queen Mary University of London was chair of both of Action on Sugar and Action on Salt.

It argues for more regulation of health and nutrition claims. It is particularly concerned about the “dangerously high” levels of sugar in on-the-go sweet snacks and highlighted Aldi Süd’s Specially Selected Triple Chocolate Cookies, which contained 39g sugar per 80g serving.

== Research ==
Published studies in The Lancet Diabetes and Endocrinology journal by expert advisors associated with Action on Sugar have highlighted the cost to public health of excessive amounts of sugar in carbonated drinks. Research findings are frequently contested by UK food and beverage industry groups, specifically, the Food and Drink Federation.

In February 2016, Action on Sugar research highlighted the levels of sugar found in hot drinks purchased from many high street chains such as Costa Coffee and Starbucks. Sugar is seen as a significant contributor to the high levels of obesity, tooth decay and Type 2 diabetes found in many developed economies such as the United Kingdom.

Public Health England published targets for the reduction of sugar in a range of products in March 2017.

== See also ==
- Obesity in the United Kingdom
- Sugary drink tax
