= Publons =

Website for researchers to share and receive credit for peer review activity

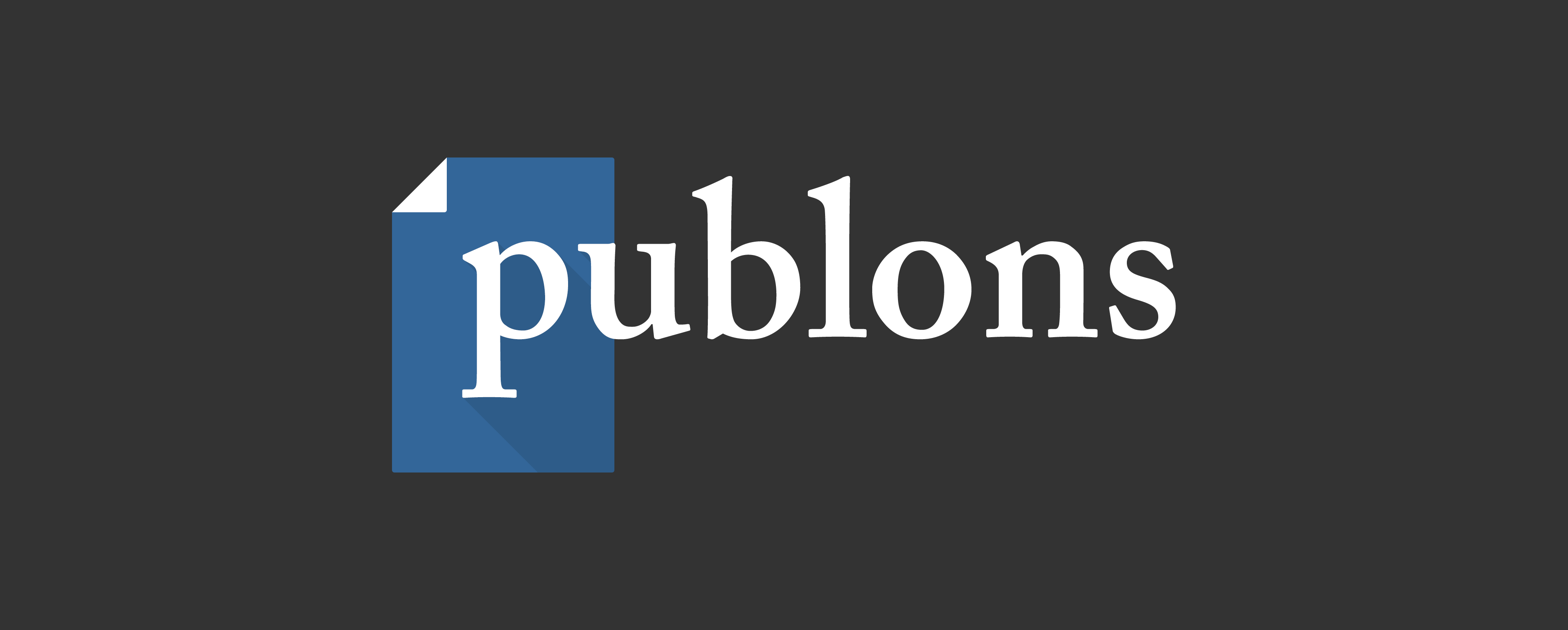
- Available in: English
- Owner: Clarivate
- Website: publons.com
- Commercial: Yes
- Registration: Required
- Users: 3,000,000
- Launched: 2012
- Current status: Website began redirecting to Web of Science on 18 August 2022

Publons was a commercial website that provided a free service for academics to track, verify, and showcase their peer review and editorial contributions for academic journals. It was launched in 2012, bought by Clarivate in 2017 and merged into Web of Science in 2022. It claimed that over 3,000,000 researchers joined the site, adding more than one million reviews across 25,000 journals. In 2019, ResearcherID was integrated with Publons.

Publons produced a verified record of a person's review and editorial activity for journals, which could be downloaded to include in CVs, funding and job applications, and promotion and performance evaluations. Publons' business model was based on partnering with publishers.

== Background ==
Publons was founded by Andrew Preston and Daniel Johnston to address the static state of peer-reviewing practices in academic research publishing, in view of encouraging collaboration and speeding scientific development. The Publons name was an homage to the "publon", the "minimum unit of publishable material". The company was registered in New Zealand and had an office in London, UK. It was acquired by Clarivate Analytics in 2017.

== Services ==
Publons also provided:

- tools for publishers to find, screen, contact, and motivate peer reviewers;
- data and publications about global peer review behaviour;
- peer review training for early-career researchers; and
- features for academics to discuss and evaluate published research

Reviewers can choose whether or not to make the content of their reviews open access following publication of the reviewed publication, though journals can choose to override this. Review content is shared using a Creative Commons CC BY 4.0 license. Publons has partnerships with many publishers and with related services such as Altmetric and ORCID.

== Publons Peer Review Awards ==
Publons Peer Review Awards are recognitions for top peer reviewers and editors. Publons' Awards started in 2016. In 2017 an award program called the Sentinel Award was added, for outstanding advocacy, innovation or contribution to scholarly peer review.

== Reception ==
TechCrunch remarked that lack of transparency leads to many problems in the publication process, and Publons purports to help with that. Research Information noted that while the site supports both pre- and post-publication review, not all reviews are published, in deference to existing publication norms. Nature noted that peer review is an important job, and reported on the reactions of two of Publons's most prolific reviewers.

Publons sends unsolicited bulk email to academics to advertise its service. This was cited by email service providers for being a violation of acceptable use policies.

== See also ==
- Web of Science
- Journal club
- JournalReview.org
- Peerage of Science
- PubPeer
