= Julie Thompson Klein =

American professor (1944–2023)

Dr. Julie Thompson Klein
- Born: 1944 December 8
- Died: 2023 January 15
- Awards: Presidents Award for Excellence in Teaching, Wayne State Univ. (1985)

Academic background
- Education: University of Oregon, Oregon State University

Academic work
- Discipline: Interdisciplinary studies
- Institutions: Wayne State University (current); Shimane University (1978-79)
- Notable works: Interdisciplinarity: History, theory and practice (1990); Crossing Boundaries: Knowledge, disciplinarities and interdisciplinarities (1996); The Oxford Handbook of Interdisciplinarity Ch.2 "A taxonomy of interdisciplinarity" (2010)

Julie Thompson Klein (December 8, 1944—January 15, 2023) was a professor and scholar in the field of Interdisciplinary Studies at Wayne State University. Klein was widely known as a pioneer in interdisciplinary education, and had consulted widely in academic and other settings in the field. In 2016, she was a speaker at the Centennial Symposium of the Association of American Colleges and Universities. During her 36 years at Wayne state, her publications had been heavily cited.

== Publications (partial) ==
Books:

- Interdisciplinarity: History, Theory, and Practice. Wayne State University Press. 1990. ISBN 0-8143-2088-0.
- Crossing Boundaries: Knowledge, Disciplinarities, and Interdisciplinarities. University of Virginia Press. 1996. ISBN 978-0-8139-1679-8.
- Humanities, Culture, and Interdisciplinarity: The Changing American Academy. SUNY Press. 27 October 2005. ISBN 978-0-7914-6577-6.
- Creating Interdisciplinary Campus Cultures: A Model for Strength and Sustainability. John Wiley & Sons. 9 December 2009. ISBN 978-0-470-57315-0.
- Transdisciplinarity: Joint Problem Solving among Science, Technology, and Society: An Effective Way for Managing Complexity. (editor). Birkhäuser. 6 December 2012. ISBN 978-3-0348-8419-8.
- Interdisciplining Digital Humanities: Boundary Work in an Emerging Field. University of Michigan Press. 2015. ISBN 978-0-472-07254-5.

Articles:

- "Interdisciplinarity and complexity: An evolving relationship." structure 71 (1984): 72.
- "Blurring, cracking, and crossing: Permeation and the fracturing of discipline." Knowledges: Historical and critical studies in disciplinarity (1993): 185–214.
- "Prospects for transdisciplinarity." Futures 36.4 (2004): 515–526.
- "Integrative learning and interdisciplinary studies." Peer Review 7, no. 4 (2005): 8–10.
- "A platform for a shared discourse of interdisciplinary education." JSSE-Journal of Social Science Education 5, no. 4 (2006).
- "Afterword: the emergent literature on interdisciplinary and transdisciplinary research evaluation." Research Evaluation 15, no. 1 (2006): 75–80.
- "Evaluation of interdisciplinary and transdisciplinary research: a literature review." American Journal of Preventive Medicine 35, no. 2 (2008): S116-S123.

== See also ==
HASTAC, the Humanities Arts Science and Technology Alliance and Collaboratory.
