= Interdiscipline =

Cross-disciplinary research

An interdiscipline or inter-discipline is a field that involves two or more academic disciplines but which also meets the formal criteria (such as dedicated research journals, conferences and university departments) to be considered a discipline in its own right. A field may be both a discipline and an interdiscipline at the same time, such as demography as explained below. A field may also be regarded as a discipline in some countries but an interdiscipline in other countries, such as information science.

== Conceptions ==
Giesecke (1981) says about educational research ("pedagogy") that is an "aporetic science", i.e. an interdiscipline.

Tengström (1993) emphases that cross-disciplinary research is a process, not a state or structure. He differentiates three levels of ambition regarding cross-disciplinary research:

- The pluridisciplinary or multidisciplinarity level
- The genuine cross-disciplinary level: interdisciplinarity
- The discipline-forming level transdisciplinarity

What is described here is a view of social fields as dynamic and changing. Library and information science is viewed as a field that started as a multidisciplinary approach based on literature, psychology, sociology, management, computer science etc., which is developing towards an academic discipline in its own right.

== Examples ==
- Biosemiotics
- Cryptography
- Demography

"As a field with its own body of interrelated concepts, techniques, journals, and professional associations, demography is clearly a discipline. But by the nature of its subject matter and methods demography is just as clearly an 'interdiscipline', drawing heavily on biology and sociology for the study of fertility; on economics and geography for studies of migration; and on the health sciences for the study of mortality." (Stycos, 1989, vii).

- Forensic Kinesiology
- Genetic toxicology
- Humor and translation
- Information science

In America information science and communication studies are considered two academic disciplines. In France, however, they are considered one interdiscipline. (See also).

- Planetary science
- Public health
- Social science in agriculture
- Sociolinguistics

== See also ==
- Academic discipline
- Interdisciplinarity
