= Health Policy and Planning =

Peer-reviewed health policy journal

- Discipline: Health policy
- Language: English
- Edited by: Sandra Mounier-Jack; Virginia Wiseman

Publication details
- History: 1986–present
- Publisher: Oxford University Press
- Frequency: 10 issues/year
- Impact factor: 2.717 (2018)

Standard abbreviations
- ISO 4: Health Policy Plan.

Indexing
- ISSN: 0268-1080 (print); 1460-2237 (web)
- LCCN: 92645946
- OCLC no.: 890359691

Links
- Journal homepage; Online archive

Health Policy and Planning is a peer-reviewed scientific journal covering the study of health policy and health services. It was established in 1986 and is published 10 times per year by Oxford University Press in association with the London School of Hygiene and Tropical Medicine. The editors-in-chief are Sandra Mounier-Jack and Virginia Wiseman (London School of Hygiene and Tropical Medicine). According to the Journal Citation Reports, the journal has a 2018 impact factor of 2.717, ranking it 29th out of 98 journals in the category "Health Care Sciences & Services".
