= School of Integrative Studies =

Constituent college of George Mason University

The School of Integrative Studies (formerly New Century College) is housed within George Mason University's College of Humanities and Social Sciences and is located on the main campus of George Mason University in Fairfax, Virginia. The School of Integrative Studies was founded as New Century College in 1995 in response to the Commonwealth of Virginia's call for a "University of the 21st Century."

On May 1, 2016, the School of Integrative Studies changed their name from New Century College.

== Programs ==
The School of Integrative Studies offers a Bachelor of Arts and a Bachelor of Science degree in integrative studies; a bachelor of individualized study; a Bachelor of Arts in human development and family science (joint degree with the College of Education and Human Development); and a Bachelor of Arts in environmental and sustainability studies (joint degree with Environmental Science and Policy in the College of Science). As part of the integrative studies and individualized study degree programs, students complete their degree with an interdisciplinary concentration in such areas as Childhood Studies, Education Studies, International Studies, Leadership and Organizational Development, Legal Studies, Life Sciences, and Social Justice and Human Rights. The School of Integrative Studies also offers minors in leadership, nonprofit studies, social innovation, and well-being.

Social Action and Integrative Learning, an evolving community of Mason students, faculty, administrators, alumni, and community partners who are active and passionate collaborators in effecting positive social change, is housed within the School of Integrative Studies.
