= St. Scholastica Academy =

St. Scholastica Academy or St. Scholastica's College may refer to:

- St. Scholastica Academy (Chicago, Illinois)
- St. Scholastica Academy (Covington, Louisiana)
- St. Scholastica's Academy, Pampanga in San Fernando, Pampanga, Philippines
- St. Scholastica's Academy of Marikina in Marikina, Philippines
