= Peerage of Science =

Alternative system to traditional scientific peer review as a service

Peerage of Science was a scientific peer review service aimed at improving "the current peer review system and make the peer review process more scientific, fair and transparent". The company was founded in 2011 by the scientists Janne Kotiaho, Mikko Mönkkönen, and Janne-Tuomas Seppänen in Jyväskylä, Finland. Initially it focused on the areas of "ecology, evolutionary biology and conservation biology", but within 2 years it expanded to other areas of science.

The service was the winner of the 2012 Award for Publishing Innovation from The Association of Learned and Professional Society Publishers (ALPSP), and of the 2013 recognition award from Communications Professionals of Finnish Universities.

Despite patronage from several paying customers, including the Society for Conservation Biology, Springer Nature, and Taylor & Francis, the company failed to expand its market base (it received only 102 submissions in 2017 and only 60% of submissions received at least one publishing offer) and went out of business soon after.

== Differences to traditional peer review ==
The service had several practices that differed from the traditional approaches to academic peer review and submissions.

=== Concurrent and shared journal consideration ===
PoS implemented a "unified reviewing process", which reduced "the workload of the reviewers’ community, as manuscripts do not need to be reviewed repeatedly while descending the journal prestige ladder." Journals participating in the system's Select option had concurrent access to all peer review processes. Editors were free to make publishing offers to authors at any time, and authors were free to choose whether to accept or decline the offers. Journals participating in the system's Connect option had access to a process if authors chose to submit to that journal. In both cases, the same peer reviews were used by several journals, instead of being discarded in the event of rejection from one journal.

=== Improving the quality of reviews ===
PoS aimed to enhance the quality of reviewing by encouraging non-anonymous review, introducing ‘peer review of peer review’, providing the possibility for reviewers to publish their review as a ‘Peerage Essay’ (PE) and to build a ‘referee factor’.

=== Attracting reviewers ===
The motivation to participate as a peer reviewer in this system came from a reputation system where the quality of the reviewing was scored by other users, and contributed to one's profile. Evaluation of other peer reviewers was an additional task for participating academics, but most appeared to be eager to do this: while other stages were completed typically just before a deadline, the judging task was on average completed in just a few days. Also, PoS had rules, that "peers can only submit manuscripts when they keep in balance the number of reviews performed and the number of manuscripts submitted".

=== Open engagement ===
Instead of reviewers being appointed by an editor, reviewers in this system chose what they wanted to review. Thus, the process could terminate at first deadline if there were no willing peer reviewers, or it could attract many more reviewers than the standard two. Any user, including the authors themselves, could recommend a reviewer for a manuscript. However, peers from the same institutions as authors, and peers who have co-authored with authors in the last three years, were automatically excluded and could not peer review the manuscript.

=== Author control over deadlines ===
Upon uploading their manuscript to the system, authors could specify four deadlines:

1. Deadline for sending peer reviews
2. Deadline for peer-review-of-peer-review, the reciprocal judging of the accuracy of peer reviews
3. Deadline for sending the revised manuscript
4. Deadline for final evaluation of the revised manuscript

During the process, the deadlines are automatically enforced.

== Business model ==
The company's services were free for scientists and it did not pay peer reviewers. Publishers of participating journals paid for usage of the service. Peerage of Science had such contracts with e.g. Springer, Taylor & Francis, BioMed Central, Elsevier and Brill.

== See also ==
- F1000 (publisher)
- Frontiers Media
- PeerJ
- Publons
- PubPeer
- Rubriq
