= ReScience C =

- Discipline: Reproducibility
- Language: English
- Edited by: Olivia Guest, Benoît Girard, Konrad Hinsen, Nicolas Rougier

Publication details
- History: 2015–present
- Publisher: GitHub
- Frequency: Continuous
- Open access: Yes
- License: CC BY 4.0

Standard abbreviations
- ISO 4: ReSci. C

Indexing
- ISSN: 2430-3658
- OCLC no.: 1272925149

Links
- Journal homepage; Online archive

ReScience C is a scientific journal established in 2015 by Nicolas Rougier and Konrad Hinsen with the aim of publishing researchers' attempts to replicate computations made by other authors, using independently written, free and open-source software (FOSS), with an open process of peer review. The journal states that requiring the replication software to be free and open-source ensures the reproducibility of the original research.

== Creation ==
The journal was established in 2015 by Nicolas Rougier and Konrad Hinsen in the context of the replication crisis of the early 2010s, in which concern about difficulty in replicating (different data or details of method) or reproducing (same data, same method) peer-reviewed, published research papers was widely discussed. The journal's scope is computational research, with the motivation that journals rarely require the provision of source code, and when source code is provided, it is rarely checked against the results claimed in the research article.

== Policies and methods ==
The scope of the journal is mainly focussed on researchers' attempts to replicate computations made by other authors, using independently written, free and open-source software (FOSS). Articles are submitted using the "issues" feature of a git repository run by GitHub, together with other online archiving services, including Zenodo and Software Heritage. Peer review takes place publicly in the same "issues" online format.

In 2020, Nature reported on the results of the journal's "Ten Years' Reproducibility Challenge", in which scientists were asked to try reproducing the results from peer-reviewed articles that they had published at least ten years earlier, using the same data and software if possible, updated to a modern software environment and free licensing. As of 24 August 2020, out of 35 researchers who had proposed to reproduce the results of 43 of their old articles, 28 reports had been written, 13 had been accepted after peer review and published, among which 11 documented successful reproductions.
