= Graham MacGregor =

British academic (1941–2025)

Graham Alexander MacGregor CBE (1 April 1941 – 1 September 2025) was a British academic who was professor of Cardiovascular Medicine at the Wolfson Institute, Queen Mary University of London.

== Life and career ==
MacGregor was born on 1 April 1941 in St Albans, Hertfordshire. He trained at Charing Cross Hospital where he was taught by the distinguished nephrologist, Professor Hugh de Wardener. MacGregor's own speciality at this stage was also in kidney disease. He developed an interest in the relationship between kidney function and high blood pressure which led him to a parallel campaigning role, attempting to persuade food manufacturers to reduce the quantity of salt in factory produced food.

He founded Blood Pressure UK in 2001. He later became chairman of Action on Sugar.

MacGregor was also honorary consultant physician at St George's Hospital, London, and a visiting professor at St George's Hospital Medical School, London.

He was appointed Commander of the Order of the British Empire (CBE) in the 2019 Birthday Honours for services to cardiovascular disease.

MacGregor died on 1 September 2025, at the age of 84.

== Recognition ==
MacGregor was elected a Fellow of the Academy of Medical Sciences in 2003.

He was listed in the IoS Happy List, 2012.
