= PubPeer =

Scientific review website

- Website: pubpeer.com
- Launched: 2012

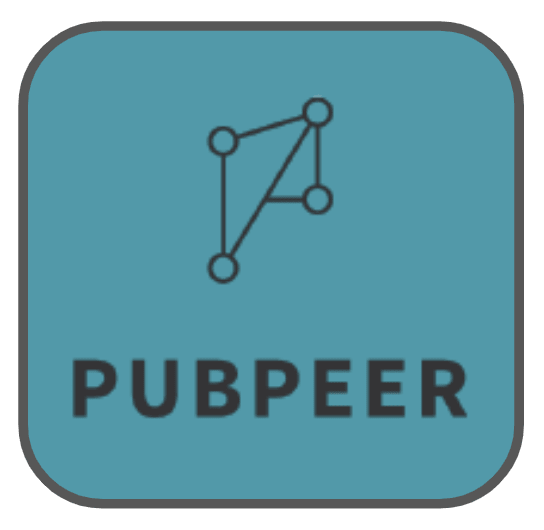
Logo

PubPeer is a website that allows users to discuss and review scientific research after publication, i.e. post-publication peer review, established in 2012.

The site has served as a whistleblowing platform, in that it highlighted shortcomings in several high-profile papers, in some cases leading to retractions and to accusations of scientific fraud, as noted by Retraction Watch. Contrary to most platforms, it allows anonymous post-publication commenting, a controversial feature which is the main factor for its success. Consequently, accusations of libel have been levelled at some of PubPeer's users; correspondingly the website has since 2016 told commentators to use only facts that can be publicly verified.

Questions have been raised about the copyright ownership of PubPeer's often-anonymous contents.

In 2021 a study found that "more than two-thirds of comments [on PubPeer] are posted to report some type of misconduct, mainly about image manipulation". Health sciences and life sciences were shown to have most comments, and most comments reporting publishing fraud and data manipulation. Social science and humanities disciplines in turn had fewer comments, but the highest percentage comments about critical reviews about theory and highlight methodological flaws. The research concluded that "while biochemists access the site to report misconduct... social scientists and humanists use it to discuss conclusions and detect methodological errors". The study also reported that 85.6% of comments are anonymous and that "only 31.5% of publications received more than three comments, and the response rate of authors is very low (7.5%)."

In 2023 a study found that "only 21.5% of the articles [flagged on PubPeer] that deserve an editorial notice (i.e., honest errors, methodological flaws, publishing fraud, manipulation) were corrected by the [relevant] journal".

In November 2024, PubPeer and its co-Founder, Brandon Stell, received the Institutional Award for research integrity from the Einstein Foundation (Germany).

== See also ==
- Open peer review
- Journal club
- JournalReview.org
- Publons
