= Elise Brezis =

Economist

Elise S. Brezis
- אליס ברזיס
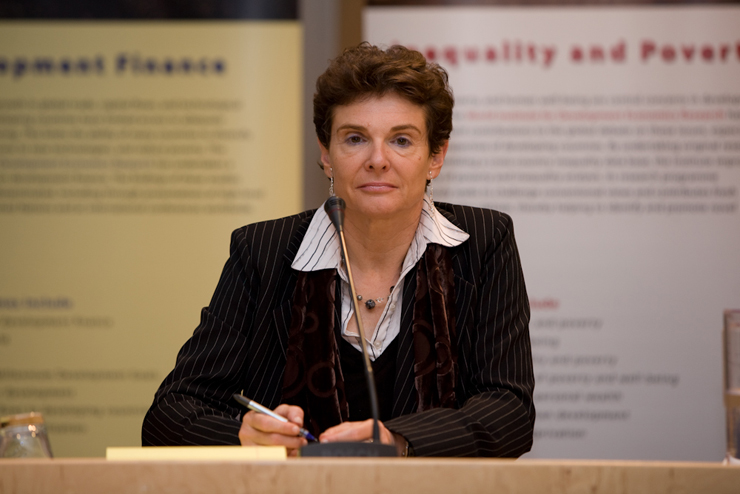

Academic background
- Education: Massachusetts Institute of Technology
- Doctoral advisor: Paul Krugman; Rüdiger Dornbusch
- Website: Information at IDEAS / RePEc

Elise Scheiner Brezis (Hebrew: אליס ברזיס) professor of economics at Bar-Ilan University, is the director of the Azrieli Center for Economic Policy. She has been the head of the Statistics division at the Research Department in the Bank of Israel, and from 1999 to 2003, she was the president of the Israeli Association for the Study of European Integration. She holds a PhD in economics from Massachusetts Institute of Technology (1989).

Her first works in economic history were on 18th century England and are where she developed previously nonexistent data on the balance of payments of the UK. Her research interests are related to economic growth. Her main works are in two fields: the first is the interaction between sociology and economics emphasizing the stratification of society and focusing on the elites; the second is technology, demography, and economic growth. In the former, she has been on the forefront of research in the field of elites. In the latter, her most cited work dealing with technology and growth on leapfrogging in international competition, a paper on the theory of cycles in national technological leadership that she worked on with Paul Krugman, published in the American Economic Review in 1993. She is also a fellow at the Minerva Center for Growth in Jerusalem and serves on the editorial board of Cliometrica.

== Contributions ==
=== Elites and Economics ===
Brezis examines the evolution of recruitment of elites and investigates the nature of the links between recruitment of elites and economic growth. The main change that occurred in the way the Western world recruited its elites is that meritocracy became the basis for their recruitment. Although meritocratic selection should result in the best being chosen, she shows that meritocratic recruitment actually leads to class stratification and auto-recruitment.

Brezis's book examines the relationship between elites, minorities, and economic growth. The novelty of the book lies in its focus on the interaction between social and economic changes during economic growth.

=== Technology and Economic Growth ===
1. In Brezis's work with Krugman, they emphasized that endogenous-growth theory suggests that technological change tends to reinforce the position of the leading nations. Yet sometimes this leadership role shifts. They suggest a mechanism that explains this pattern of 'leapfrogging' as a response to occasional major changes in technology.

2. On government policy towards technological development, Brezis argues that the method used for financing projects is too conservative: Peer review mechanism has a clear bias against innovative ideas. In consequence, proposals for new ideas are too often rejected. Brezis proposes to adopt a Focal Randomization mechanism.

3. Brezis and Warren Young have studied together the new views on demographic transition, in which they reassess Malthus and Marx's approach to population. Their paper examines the divergence of views of Marx and Malthus regarding the family and the labor market. In short, children of developing countries are a necessity so they can not be seen as a consumption good.

=== Economics of Transition ===
Brezis has examined the transition process that took place in Eastern Europe. She analyzes why the transition process is different in Eastern Europe and in Asia, and shows that the main difference between Eastern Europe who has turned to democracy to China which is still non-democratic is the relationship between economic and political structures. Moreover, looking at the history of the transition process, it is striking that the historical path in Eastern Europe was dominated by its geographic situation. Her research explain why geography matters and present a structure that makes a relationship between geography and transition.

== Main works ==
=== Elites ===
"Elites, Minorities and Economic Growth", ed. with Peter Temin, North Holland, Elsevier, 1999

"The Role of Higher Education Institutions: Recruitment of Elites and Economic Growth" (with François Crouzet) in T. Eicher, eds. Institutions and Economic Growth, MIT Press, 2006:191-213.

"Elites and Economic Outcomes" in S. Durlauf and L. Blume, eds. New Palgrave Dictionary of Economics. 2008.

“Changes in the Training of the Power Elites in Western Europe”, ed. with F. Crouzet, The Journal of European Economic History. 2004.

"Why are Elites self-Reproducing? The Effects of Higher Education on Social mobility at the Top"

=== Technology, demography and growth ===
"Leapfrogging in International Competition: A Theory of Cycles in National Technological Leadership." (with Paul Krugman and Daniel Tsiddon), American Economic Review, December 1993, pp. 1211 1219.

"Technology and Life Cycle of Cities"(with Paul Krugman), Journal of Economic Growth, December 1997, pp. 369–383.

“Focal Randomization: An optimal Mechanism for the Evaluation of R&D projects", Science and Public Policy, December 2007, 34(9).

"Immigration, Investments and Growth" (with Paul Krugman), Journal of Population Economics, 9, 1996, pp. 83 93. https://ideas.repec.org/a/spr/jopoec/v9y1996i1p83-93.html

"Social Classes, Demographic Transition and Economic Growth", European Economic Review, 2001, 45: 707–717.

"The New views on Demographic Transition: A Reassessment of Malthus's and Marx's Approach to Population" (with Warren Young), European Journal of Economic Thought, 2003, 10: 25–45.

"Can Demographic Transition only be Explained by Altruistic and Neo-Malthusian Models?", Journal of Socio-Economics, 2009.

=== Economic history and economics of transition ===
"Britain's Balance of Payments in the Century before Waterloo: New Estimates, Controlled Conjectures", Economic History Review, February 1995, pp. 46 67.

“The Role of Assignats during the French Revolution: Evil or Rescuer?” (with Francois Crouzet), Journal of European Economic History, April 1995, pp. 7‑40.

“Did Foreign Capital Flows Finance the Industrial Revolution? A reply”, Economic History Review, February 1997

"Mercantilism" Oxford Encyclopedia of Economic History, Oxford University Press, 2003, vol. 3, pp. 482–85.

“Why are the Transition Paths in China and Eastern Europe Different? A Political Economy Perspective” (with Adi Schnytzer), Economics of Transition, 2003, 11:3-23.

“Political Institutions and Economic Reforms in Central and Eastern Europe: A Snowball Effect” (with Thierry Verdier) Economic Systems, 2003, 27:289-311.

== Sources ==
- BIU
