= Scholastica (company) =

Academic journal platform

- Industry: Academic Publishing
- Founded: 2012 in Chicago, Illinois, United States
- Founders: Brian Cody, Rob Walsh, and Cory Schires
- Number of employees: 13
- Website: scholasticahq.com

Scholastica is a web-based software platform for managing academic journals with integrated peer review and open access publishing tools.

== History ==
Scholastica was founded in 2012 by Brian Cody, Rob Walsh, and Cory Schires, who met while they were graduate students at the University of Chicago. In May 2014, Scholastica acquired $510,000 in seed funding from investors.

== Product ==
Scholastica offers three main products: a journal peer review management system, a single-source article production service, and an open access journal publishing platform with built-in analytics and archiving and discovery service integrations. Scholastica customers include journals in the humanities, social sciences, and STEM, as well as student-run law reviews.

== Academic publishing ==
In March 2016 Discrete Analysis, an arXiv overlay journal launched by Fields Medalist Sir Timothy Gowers, started using Scholastica for both Peer review and Open Access publishing.

== Open access ==
Scholastica is a supporter of the open access movement. Scholastica has worked with open access advocates like Björn Brembs, Ulrich Herb, Stevan Harnad and others to create open access resources for the academic community.

Scholastica has been referenced by scholars including, Mark C. Wilson, as a software and service-based open access publishing option that could lower publishing costs by “at least 75% of current payments.”

== Typesetting service ==
In February 2018, Scholastica launched a new typesetting service for open access journals that uses technology to generate HTML, PDF, and full-text XML articles from DOCX files.
