= List of Southern Cross University people =

The following are notable alumni and staff of Southern Cross University.

== Notable alumni ==
- Darren Albert, former rugby league footballer
- Lina Eve, artist, adoption activist, singer/songwriter, photographer and filmmaker
- Deej Fabyc, performance artist
- Paul Glynn, Jesuit author
- Justin Harrison, former rugby union player
- David Heilpern, magistrate
- Jacqueline Hey, chairperson of the Bendigo and Adelaide Bank
- Debra Jackson, OAM nurse, academic and author
- Ashok Lavasa, IAS Former Election commissioner of India
- Caroline Le Couteur, politician
- Jodi Martin, singer-songwriter
- Daniel McDaniel, former Major General in the Australian Army
- Vavine Nadesalingam, Papua New Guinean social entrepreneur
- Ben Newton, OAM, paralympic gold medalist
- Andrew Nikolic, Liberal politician
- James Page, educationist
- Steve Price, MNZM, former rugby league footballer
- Linda Reynolds, politician
- Tamara Smith, politician
- Mickalene Thomas, American painter
- Jone Usamate, Fijian politician
- Poto Williams, MP, Member of the New Zealand Parliament

== Notable faculty members ==
- Kirsten Benkendorff, marine scientist, and 2000 Young Australian of the Year
- Leigh Carriage, an Australian vocalist, educator and songwriter is a senior lecturer in the Contemporary Music Program at Southern Cross University.
- Barry Conyngham, AM an Australian composer and academic.
- Garry Egger, an Australian academic and author, particularly recognized for his work in health promotion, preventive health and lifestyle medicine.
- Michael Hannan, composer and musicologist, founder of the University's Bachelor in Contemporary Music program.
- Peter L. Harrison, an Australian marine biologist and ecologist.
- Jerome Vanclay, awarded the Queen's Award for Forestry in 1997, and the IUFRO Scientific Achievement Award in 2010.

== Administration ==
=== Chancellors ===
Order	Chancellor	Years	Notes
1	Andrew Rogers, AO, QC	1994–1998	
2	Lionel Phelps, AM	1998–2002	
3	John Dowd, AO, QC	2002–2014	
4	Nick Burton Taylor, AM	2014–2021	
5	Sandra McPhee, AM	2021–present	

=== Vice-Chancellors ===
Order	Vice-Chancellor	Years	Notes
1	Barry Conyngham, AM	1994–2000	
2	John Anthony Rickard	2000–2004	
3	Paul Clark	2004–2009	
4	Peter Lee	2009–2016	
5	Adam Shoemaker	2016–2020	
6	Tyrone Carlin	2020–present	
