= Southern Cross Group =

Southern Cross Group may refer to:

- Southern Cross Group (Australia), a forestry and forest ecology group
- Southern Cross group (New Zealand), a collection of independent, health-oriented businesses in New Zealand
- Southern Cross Group Stadium, a stadium in New South Wales, Australia
