= Lisa Alexander =

Lisa Alexander may refer to:

- Lisa Alexander (synchronized swimmer)
- Lisa Alexander (netball)
- Lisa Alexander (earth scientist)
