= NMSC =

NMSC may refer to:

- National Merit Scholarship Corporation
- Northwestern Mindanao State College of Science and Technology
- National Marine Science Centre, Australia
- Non-melanoma skin cancer
- North Mississauga Soccer Club
