= Queen's Award =

The Queen's Award or Queens Awards (now the Kings Award or Awards can refer to:

- Queen's Awards for Enterprise, formerly the Queen's Awards to Industry
- Queen's Award for Voluntary Service (formerly the Queens Golden Jubilee Award , an annual award given to groups in the voluntary sector of the United Kingdom
- Queen's Award for Forestry

== See also ==
- The Queen's Anniversary Prizes for Higher and Further Education
