= Vavine Nadesalingam =

Papua New Guinean entrepreneur

- Other names: Vavine Kila Nadesalingam; Vani K. Nades
- Education: IBSUniversity; Southern Cross University
- Occupation: Entrepreneur
- Organization: Voices for Village Foundation

Vavine Nadesalingam is a Papua New Guinean social entrepreneur and founder of the Voices for Village Foundation.

== Early life ==
Nadesalingam is from Papua New Guinea. She grew up living in her parents' and grandparents' villages, which did not have access to running water or electricity. She left high school after year 10, and later attended IBSUniversity in Papua New Guinea, and Southern Cross University at the Coffs Harbour campus in New South Wales, Australia.

== Career ==
Nadesalingam is the CEO of Emstret Holdings Ltd. The organisation is a local internet service provider and is focused on giving rural schools and communities access to the internet. She founded the not-for-profit Voices for Village Foundation, which was created to assist people in rural Papua New Guinean villages access education, health, sanitation, clean water, electricity and technology.

She is also a board member of the PNG Institute of Directors and the Port Moresby Chamber of Commerce, and the ambassador for the China-PNG Friendship Association. She is the Port Moresby honorary consulate to Australia.

Nadesalingam attended the 2016 Global Entrepreneurship Summit which was held in Silicon Valley in California, US, alongside fellow Papua New Guinean entrepreneur, Hubert Namani. At the time, she was working with Emstret Training and Consultancy. She was the first woman chosen to represent Papua New Guinea at the summit.

In 2018, Nadesalingam was a member of Southern Cross University's inaugural "Conversations That Matter" alumni panel. On the same day, she won the Entrepreneur of the Year at the university's annual Alumni of the Year awards.
