= Trinajstić =

Trinajstić, Trinajstic is a Croatian surname. Notable people with the surname include:

- Dinko Trinajstić, Croatian lawyer and politician
- Ivo Trinajstić (1933–2024), Croatian botanist
- Kate Trinajstic, Australian paleontologist and evolutionary biologist
- Nenad Trinajstić (1936–2021), Croatian chemist
