= Kirsten Benkendorff =

Marine biologist

- Born: 1973 (age 52–53)
- Education: University of Wollongong Macquarie University
- Occupation: Marine Scientist
- Title: Professor
- Scientific career
- Workplaces: Southern Cross University
- Thesis: Bioactive molluscan resources and their conservation: Chemical and biological studies on the egg masses of marine molluscs
- Website: https://www.scu.edu.au/marine-ecology-research-centre/people/kirsten-benkendorff

Kirsten Benkendorff is a marine biologist and biomedical researcher who teaches at Southern Cross University. Her research focuses on the nutritional and medicinal properties of seafood species and how they are affected by climate change, pollution and other environmental stressors. Her work has contributed 13 of the UN's Sustainable Development Goals, earning her over 8 million dollars (USD) in research funding.

Berkendorff is also a councilor, within the Malacological Society of Australasia as well as an associate editor at Scientific Reports and Marine Drugs.

== Educational background ==
Benkendorff obtained a Bachelor of Science from Macquarie University in 1994, followed by a PhD at the University of Wollongong in 1999. She was a career consultant for the Shellharbour Council in New South Wales, before becoming a lecturer in Marine Biology at Flinders University in South Australia, from 2006 to 2010, and then working at Southern Cross University.

== Career ==
Benkendorff research includes investigating bio-resource potential from marine mollusk, the effects of climate change and marine pollution, and medical applications of marine resources. This work entails a combination of medical and marine research, investigating the anti-cancer extracts from the Australian marine life.

In study conducted over 2020 and 2021, Berkendorff, along with Endang Jamal, Amanda Reichelt-Brushett, Megan Gillmore, and Brandon Pearson, monitored pesticide runoff into the Richmond River estuary in Australia. They tested the effectiveness of oysters and passive sampling devices against composite water samples from the estuary. In total they were able to analyze 21 pesticides across the three methods. In 2020 they found more pesticides detected through the oysters than in the water samples, whereas in 2021 the passive sampling device detected more pesticides than the water sample. This research was able to demonstrate the potential of using an organism as a bio monitor against other methods, promoting sustainable techniques.

In 2025, Berkendorff and colleagues published a paper showing that hemolymph protein extract (HPE) from the Australian oyster species Saccostrea glomerata can serve as antibiotic alternative to certain clinical and laboratory produced bacteria. It was shown that it inhibited the activity of significant bacteria including Streptococcus spp. a bacteria responsible for pharyngitis, urinary tract infections, and life threatening cardiovascular alterations. The HPE of the Saccostrea g. was identified to carry many known antimicrobial proteins and peptides (AMPPs) known for helping to fight off such bacteria, and it was found to be non toxic in human lung cells above effective concentrations.

== Awards ==
In 2011 she was awarded the Dorothy Hill Medal for her research on marine science, molluscs and their medicinal properties. She was awarded the Young Australian of the Year, in 2000, for Science and Technology and NSW Australian of the year, in 2001, for her contributions to the environment.

She was awarded Young Australian of the Year in 2000 and a Dorothy Hill Medal for Science in 2011.

== Publications ==
Select examples of Benkendorff's publications are as follows:

- Chemical defense in the egg masses of benthic invertebrates: an assessment of antibacterial activity in 39 mollusks and 4 polychaetes. (2001) K Benkendorff, AR Davis, JB Bremner. Journal of invertebrate pathology 78 (2), 109-118.
- Free fatty acids and sterols in the benthic spawn of aquatic molluscs, and their associated antimicrobial properties. (2005) K Benkendorff, AR Davis, CN Rogers, JB Bremner. Journal of Experimental Marine Biology and Ecology 316 (1), 29-44.
- Molluscan biological and chemical diversity: secondary metabolites and medicinal resources produced by marine molluscs. (2010). K Benkendorff. Biological Reviews 85 (4), 757-775.
- Summer, Gou, Lei, Barkla, Giles, and Benkendorff, 2025. Antimicrobial proteins from oyster hemolymph improve the efficacy of conventional antibiotics. PLOS ONE. Ihttps://journals.plos.org/plosone/article?id=10.1371/journal.pone.0312305
- Fredricks, Smith, Benkendorff, Scott, and Hall. 2025. Co-design and traditional owner participation in an assessment of abundance and size of Donax deltoides (Garlaany, pip) in Ngambaa Country. Marine and Freshwater Research,76 MF23235 https://doi.org/10.1071/MF23235
- Gray, Champion, Broadhurst, Coleman, Benkendorff. 2024. Effects of contaminants and flooding on the physiology of harvested estuarine decapod crustaceans: A global review and meta-analysis. Environmental Pollution 125347 https://doi.org/10.1016/j.envpol.2024.125347
- Ewere, White, Mauleon, & Benkendorff 2024. Soil microbial communities and degradation of pesticides in greenhouse effluent through a woodchip bioreactor', Environmental Pollution, vol. 359, pp. 124561, doi:10.1016/j.envpol.2024.124561
- Jamal, Reichelt-Brushett, Gillmore, Pearson, Benkendorff. 2024 Pesticide occurrence in a subtropical estuary, Australia: Complementary sampling methods Environmental Pollution 342, 123084 https://doi.org/10.1016/j.envpol.2023.123084
- Larkin, Davis, Harasti, Smith, Ainsworth, Benkendorff. 2023 A glimmer of hope for an Endangered temperate soft coral: the first observations of reproductive strategies and early life cycle of Dendronephthya australis (Octocorallia: Malacalcyonacea). Marine biology 170 (11), 146

== Prizes and awards ==
2011	Dorothy Hill Medal from Australian Academy of Science.
2008	SA Young Tall Poppy Award.
2001	NSW Young Australian of the Year Award - Environment Category.
2000	Young Australian of the Year Award in Science and Technology.

== Media ==
Benkendorff has published in The Sydney Morning Herald, and The Conversation, on her research into the cancer fighting properties of molluscs.

== Projects ==
- Post-flood recovery and impacts of flood related stressors on benthic invertebrates. In collaboration with NSW DPI. Funded by the Marine Estate Management Strategy
- Potential of leaf oysters for shellfish reef restoration. In collaboration with NSW DPI. Funding from NSW DPI and Coffs Harbour City Council Environmental Levy
- Impacts of flood related stressors and agricultural run-off on crabs. In collaboration with NSW DPI. Funded by FRDC & SAFEFISH
- Impacts of storm-water run-off on water quality and cultural resources. In collaboration with the Garby Traditional Elders. Funding from Coffs Harbour City Council Environmental Levy.
- Oyster leases, sedimentation and water quality. In collaboration with NSW DPI. Funded by the Marine Estate Management Strategy.
- Marine bioindicators for monitoring pesticide pollution. Funded by SIMS and DCCEEW.
- Investigation of a mangrove die-off in Boambee Creek. In collaboration with the Gumbayggnirr Rangers. Funding to NWAC from the Coffs Harbour City Council Environmental Levy.
- Climate change impacts on seafood nutritional quality. Shalders et al 2022 https://doi.org/10.1016/j.marenvres.2022.105590. In collaboration with the NSW Department of Primary Industries. Funding from Marine Estate Management Strategy.

https://www.kirstenbenkendorffmarineresearch.au/research-projects
