= IBSUniversity =

- Motto: Focusing on students centred learning
- Type: Private non-profit
- Established: 1989
- Chancellor: Gabriel Pepson
- Vice-Chancellor: Ramachandran Arunachalam
- Academic staff: 30
- Students: 700+
- Location: Port Moresby, NCD, Papua New Guinea
- Campus: Saraga (current), Eriama (current), Enga Campus (2012-2018)
- Website: www.ibsu.ac.pg

IBSUniversity (IBSU), formerly known as the Institute of Business Studies (IBS), is a tertiary education provider in Papua New Guinea, offering academic and professional courses in the fields of Accounting, Business and Information Technology.

IBSU offers a combination of locally developed and International courses ranging from Certificates, Diploma's and Degrees. The IBS produced the first two female Accountants of Papua New Guinea.

== History ==
=== Institute of Business Studies ===
The Institute of Business Studies was originally set up in 1989 by entrepreneur Mick Nades. It provided revision classes for the Papua New Guinea Institute of Accountants (PNGIA) professional exams, at which time none existed. At its inception, there were only nine qualified Papua New Guinean Accountants amongst the cohort of more than 300 Commerce/Accounting graduates from the University of Papua New Guinea (UPNG) and the Papua New Guinea University of Technology.

With the success of producing professional accountants, there was a demand to provide Certificate Courses for Grade 10/12 School Levers. IBS developed and offered its Certificate in Accounting, based on the syllabus of Accounting Technicians of United Kingdom in 2002. Certificate in Computing course was introduced in 2003. These two courses then evolved as the primary wheels of IBS. More and more school leavers joined IBS at Saraga Campus to follow these courses. IBS became a Study Centre of UPNG in 1995, and commenced classes for Diploma in Commerce (now Diploma in Accounting) a two-year programme till 2016.

IBS formed an educational collaboration agreement with Southern Cross University in 1999 and started their bachelor's degree of Business and Information Technology Programmes. These programs are offered in Mt. Eriama Campus in Port Moresby and Irelya Campus in Enga.

IBS produced the first two female Accountants of Papua New Guinea. The Institute's objective was to enhance the prospects for Papua New Guineans to study and further their careers in Accounting, Business and Computing.

=== IBSUniversity ===
IBSUniversity was established on 1 December 2016 with the ordinance of National Executive Council and gazette on 25 January 2017. It is located in Port Moresby, the capital of Papua New Guinea.

== Research ==
The IBS Journal of Business and Research focuses on the current business and development issues and their effect in Papua New Guinea and South Pacific Region.
