= Queen Elizabeth Prizes for Education =

Series of prizes

The Queen Elizabeth Prizes for Education (formerly Queen's Anniversary Prizes) are a biennially awarded series of prizes awarded to universities and colleges in the further and higher education sectors within the United Kingdom. Uniquely it forms part of the British honours system, to date rounds have occurred in 1994, 1996, 1998, 2000, 2002, 2005, 2007, 2009, 2011, 2013, 2015, 2017, 2019, 2021, 2023 and 2025.

The Queen Elizabeth Prizes for Education recognise outstanding work by UK colleges and universities that shows quality and innovation and delivers real benefit to the wider world and public through education and training. The Prizes are the highest national Honour awarded in UK further and higher education.

== History ==
The prize is awarded by the Royal Anniversary Trust, a registered charity founded in 1990 to develop a program to mark 1992 as the 40th year of Elizabeth II's reign as British monarch. The program had these four goals:

- celebrate the anniversary
- establish an educational award
- promote cultural awareness of the development of the United Kingdom's constitutional monarchy
- to promote commerce, industry, and the advancement of education

Past winners have been recognized for work in a wide range of disciplines such as science, engineering, arts and the creative industries, education, the humanities, the environment and medicine.

The next round of winners will be introduced in Autumn of 2025.

The educational award which the Royal Anniversary Trust established was the Queen's Anniversary Prize. In October 2024 the name of the Prizes scheme changed to the Queen Elizabeth Prizes for Higher and Further Education.

== Prize winners ==
=== 1994 ===
Category	Winning institution	Winning department or division	Rationale
Engineering and Technology	Aberdeen College	Training courses relating to explosion risk	UK's leading academic and research department in its field
Environment and Conservation	Bournemouth University		Services to scientific conservation
International Engagement	Burton & South Derbyshire College		Anglo-French collaboration: vocational training for the polymer industry
Education & Training	Chippenham College		Using work experience as a basis for National Vocational Qualifications
Education & Training	City and Islington College		Widening access and progression to higher education
Education & Training	Croydon College		The successful development of flexible learning workshops
Engineering & Technology	Heriot-Watt University	Petroleum Engineering	UK's leading academic and research department in its field
Environment	Imperial College of Science, Technology and Medicine	Centre for Environmental Technology	leading player in the development of a Master of Science degree for environmental management
Education & Training	Lancaster University		Opportunity for those with special needs
Engineering & Technology	Loughborough University		partnership with the aerospace industry
Medicine, Health & Welfare	Luton Sixth Form College		encouraging student volunteer involvement in health education, especially for HIV prevention
Humanities, Social Sciences & Law, Round 1 Prize-winner, 1994	Queen's University Belfast		Servicing the Northern Ireland Legal System
The Arts and Creative Industries	Royal College of Art		promoting manufacturing design for the needs of senior citizens
Engineering & Technology	University of Manchester		Research and technology transfer to industry
Education & Training	University of Plymouth		Widening access to education in a scattered rural community
Medicine and Health	University College London		Towards the control of cancer
Science & Mathematics	University of Durham		Improving awareness of sciences and engineering in schools
The Arts and Creative Industries	University of Glasgow		Offering university cultural resources to those outside the university
Science & Mathematics	University of Leicester		Developments in astronomy, space and planetary science
International Engagement	University of London, Wye College	External Programme	Professional development for agriculturalists in overseas territories
Humanities, Social Sciences & Law	University of Oxford		Exploitation of intellectual property for wealth creation

=== 1996 ===
Category	Winning institution	Winning department, division or project
Education & Training	Carlisle College	Educational access throughout life
International Engagement	College of North West London	Eastern European Links: expertise and skills transfer
Education & Training	Greenhead College	Performance monitoring to realise student potential
Science & Mathematics	Hackney Community College	Bringing young women into the sciences
Medicine, Health & Welfare	King's College London	Medical law and ethics: teaching, research and public debate.
Engineering & Technology	Leeds Metropolitan University	Technology transfer and support for small and medium sized businesses.
International Dimensions	Liverpool Hope College	The Ladakh Project: teaching and training in India for Tibetans.
Education & Training	Middlesex University	Off-campus learning, training and research for commerce, industry and public services
Environment	Queen's University Belfast	Environmental research & training in partnership with industry.
International Engagement	School of Oriental and African Studies	International distance learning: economics and finance for senior executives
Education & Training	Open University	Teacher training: opening up careers through part-time distance learning
Education & Training	The Sheffield College	Braille skills accreditation: providing a new and recognised national qualification
The Arts	University of Edinburgh	Music in the community: a course for advanced music students relating to public work in the community.
Science and Mathematics	University of Manchester	Biological sciences: multidisciplinary teaching and research.
Engineering & Technology	University of Strathclyde	Electrical power engineering: teaching and research.
The Arts	London Institute	Paper conservation: teaching and technology
Humanities, Social Sciences & Law	University of Birmingham	The Wroxeter Project: archaeology, technology and the community.
Medicine, Health & Welfare	University of Exeter	Diabetes and vascular health education and research: microvascular processes and associated work.
Medicine, Health & Welfare	University of Hull	Social work: consultancy, teaching and research.
International Engagement	University of Manchester Institute of Science & Technology	Technical education. technology transfer and academic and trade relations with Japan
Medicine, Health & Welfare	University of Oxford	Molecular medicine: collaborative research and transfer of results.
Engineering & Technology	University of Surrey	Engineering for the space industry: teaching and research for satellite operations.
Science and Mathematics	University of York	Computer science: teaching, research and transfer of technology.

=== 1998 ===
Category	Winning institution	Rationale
Education & Training	MidKent College	A model programme for customer service
Education & Training	Birmingham College of Food, Tourism & Creative Studies	Education and training for the hospitality and tourism industries
Education & Training	City College Plymouth	Local outreach centres for retraining and lifelong learning
Science & Mathematics	Godalming College	Research and innovative teaching for 'A' Level science
Education & Training	Hills Road Sixth Form College	Upgrading facilities and teaching in sports and music for use by the college and the region
International Dimensions	Loughborough University	International development engineering: teaching, training, research and consultancy for developing countries.
Education & Training	Middlesex University	Creation of materials for technology teaching in schools.
International Dimensions	Royal Holloway, University of London	Information security: teaching and research in a crucial IT field.
The Arts	Royal Northern College of Music	Teaching of musical instruments to large groups.
The Arts	The Arts University College at Bournemouth	Education for the film industry.
Humanities, Social Sciences & Law	University of Sheffield	Humanities research: new cultural access through IT.
The Arts	London Institute	Creativity and innovation in fashion education
Science & Mathematics	University of Cambridge	Mathematics applied: the Isaac Newton Centre.
Medicine, Health & Welfare	University of Dundee	Minimal access surgery: new techniques and treatments.
Medicine, Health & Welfare	University of Exeter	Children's health and exercise: research and dissemination.
Science & Mathematics	University of Glasgow	Computing science: teaching and research.
Engineering & Technology	University of Manchester Institute of Science and Technology	Engineering and technology in industry: advanced degree programmes.
Humanities, Social Sciences & Law	University of Reading	Shakespearean research: Internet and the Globe Theatre.
Education & Training	University of Wales, Lampeter	Accreditation and up-skilling of workers from the voluntary sector.
Medicine, Health & Welfare	University of Wales College of Medicine	Chemiluminescence: research and development in clinical diagnosis.
Engineering & Technology	University of Wales, Swansea	Industry oriented degrees in materials engineering.

=== 2000 ===
Category	Winning institution	Rationale
Engineering & Technology	Banff and Buchan College of Further Education	Marine engineering education for the fishing industry
Education & Training	Bridgwater College	Forest School: an outdoor educational curriculum for the very young
Engineering & Technology	Cardiff University	Manufacturing Engineering Centre: partnership with industry
Education & Training	Greenhead College	Curriculum development for sixth form students
International Engagement	Hastings College of Arts and Technology	Technical education and training for the United Arab Emirates
Medicine and Health	Imperial College of Science, Technology & Medicine	Research and training in surgery
Education & Training	Lauder College	Employment and Enterprise Centres: services for unemployed people
Engineering & Technology	Loughborough University	Optical engineering: applications and knowledge transfer
Environment and Conservation	Middlesex University	Floor Hazard Research Centre: education, training and research
International Engagement	Oxford Brookes University	Education and training for humanitarian aid workers
Environment and Conservation	Queen's University Belfast	Palaeoecology Centre: research in environmental history
The Arts and Creative Industries	Royal College of Art	Conservation of art, craft and design
The Arts and Creative Industries	Royal Northern College of Music	Wind ensemble music: commissioning, training and performance
Science and Mathematics	The Sixth Form College, Colchester	STEP (Science and Technology Enrichment Programme)
Environment and Conservation	University of Sheffield	Integrated environmental outreach to industry and government
Medicine and Health	University of Aberdeen	Clinical applications of medical imaging technology
Engineering & Technology	University of Bath	Power transmission and motion control
Medicine and Health	University College London	Child Health: research and education
International Engagement	University of Greenwich	Food security in the developing world: practical projects, education and training
Science and Mathematics	University of Nottingham	Magnetic resonance imaging: scientific research and development
Medicine and Health	University of Oxford	Centre for Tropical Medicine: treatment, research and education
Engineering & Technology	University of Salford	Information technology for the construction industry
Humanities, Social Sciences & Law	University of Surrey Roehampton	National Centre for Research in Children's Literature

=== 2002 ===
Category	Winning institution	Rationale
Education & Training	Deeside College	Commercial services: training for local and national
The Arts and Creative Industries	Hills Road Sixth Form College	Art and design: a community partnership
Engineering & Technology	Imperial College of Science, Technology & Medicine	Process systems engineering: research and technology transfer
Science and Mathematics	John Leggott College	Science teaching: dissemination and partnership in the region
Humanities, Social Sciences and Law	King's College London	Defence and post-war studies: education, research and training
Humanities, Social Sciences & Law	London School of Economics & Political Science	Unemployment and inequality: research, teaching and policy development
Science & Mathematics	Loughborough University	Sports development, education and research
Science and Mathematics	Matthew Boulton College of FE & HE	Cleaning science: education and training for industry
Environment and Conservation	New College Nottingham	Renovation of a heritage building and the creation of a new campus
Medicine and Health	Queen Margaret University	Clinical application of speech science
The Arts and Creative Industries	Royal Northern College of Music	International music festivals: education, cultural and for the public
Humanities, Social Sciences & Law	Sabhal Mor Ostaig	Promotion of Gaelic language and culture
Humanities, Social Sciences & Law	University of Cambridge	Charles Darwin Correspondence Project
Medicine and Health	University College London	Oral health care: teaching, research and patient care
Engineering and Technology	University of Greenwich	Development of IT evacuation tools for the safety industry
Science and Mathematics	University of Leicester	Genetics: research and impact on science and society
Science & Mathematics	University of Manchester Institute of Science & Technology	Corrosion control and protection: education, research and technology transfer
International Engagement	University of Oxford	Refugee Studies Centre: education, training and research
Medicine and Health	University of Sheffield	Health and social care of older people: research and policy development
Engineering & Technology	University of Surrey	Research & development of ion beams and optoelectronic devices

=== 2005 ===
Category	Winning institution	Rationale
Engineering and Technology	Accrington and Rossendale College	Access and achievement in construction industry education
Medicine and Health	Birkbeck, University of London	Neuropsychological work with the very young: improving the understanding of brain function and cognitive development
International Engagement	Chichester College	Developing the college and its community through international student intake and integration
Engineering and Technology	Cranfield University	The Fellowship in Manufacturing Management: improving cost effectiveness for industry
The Arts and Creative Industries	Guildhall School of Music & Drama	Guildhall Connect: a large-scale programme using musical creativity to engage and inspire young people
Humanities, Social Sciences & Law	Harper Adams University	Developing women-owned business to support the rural economy
Engineering & Technology	Lancaster University	Connecting the last mile: providing the largest rural high-capacity regional broadband network for education in Europe
Science and Mathematics	Liverpool John Moores University	Developing the world’s largest robotic telescopes and creating access for the public and school students
Medicine and Health	London School of Hygiene and Tropical Medicine	Reducing blindness worldwide
Education & Training	Loreto College	Educational provision in an urban context: raising aspiration and achievement
Humanities, Social Sciences & Law	Loughborough University	Enhancing social policy nationally
Environment and Conservation	Newcastle University	Remedies for mine water pollution worldwide
Environment and Conservation	Queen's University Belfast	Ionic liquids: a green solution for pollution
Medicine and Health	University of Edinburgh	The virtual hospital online: transforming veterinary and medical education
Science & Mathematics	University of Cambridge	The Millennium Mathematics Project: inspiring the study of mathematics
Medicine and Health	University of Dundee	Enabling the discovery of new drugs and their development to treat major global diseases
Medicine and Health	University of Exeter	Using genetics to improve clinical care for diabetic patients
Medicine and Health	University of Oxford	Uniquely large-scale medical studies: preventing disability and prolonging life
Environment and Conservation	University of Reading	Weather and climate science: research, training and informing environmental policymaking
Engineering & Technology	University of Southampton	Sound and vibration: improving the quality of life for the profoundly deaf and reducing noise pollution
Environment and Conservation	University of York	Novel agricultural products: a sustainable future for farming manufacture, health care and crime prevention

=== 2007 ===
Category	Winning institution	Rationale
Medicine and Health	Cardiff University	Transforming healthcare for families with inherited disorders
Science and Mathematics	City and Islington College	Creating pathways to employment and higher education in the sciences
Engineering & Technology	Coventry University	Educating tomorrow's world leaders in automotive design
International Engagement	Cranfield University	Building sustainable mine-clearing capabilities in affected countries
The Arts and Creative Industries	Guildhall School of Music & Drama	The Opera Programme: training exceptional young singers
Medicine and Health	Imperial College London	Bringing healthcare to millions in Africa
Education & Training	Joseph Chamberlain Sixth Form College	A strategy for high aspiration, personal achievement and social benefit
Education & Training	John Wheatley College	Community regeneration through innovation and partnership
Engineering & Technology	Loughborough University	Reducing road traffic deaths: vehicle, road and driver safety research
Environment and Conservation	Oxford Brookes University	Postgraduate degrees and training for the conservation of primates in their global habitats
Education & Training	Southern Regional College	Reducing sectarianism and social exclusion through the College curriculum and community outreach
Education & Training	Telford College of Arts and Technology	Delivering economically important skills on employers' premises
Medicine and Health	City Literary Institute	A distinctive approach to speech therapy that supports and empowers people who stammer
Humanities, Social Sciences & Law	University of Kent	The Law Clinic
The Arts and Creative Industries	University of the Arts London	Educating the world's creative shoe and accessory designers
Science & Mathematics	University of Cambridge	A 21st century model of applied research and entrepreneurship in biotechnology
International Engagement	University of Greenwich	'Tabiesa': A UK/Africa partnership supporting local business enterprise and tackling root causes of poverty
Humanities, Social Sciences & Law	University of Oxford	Fresh light on British history: the Oxford Dictionary of National Biography
Engineering & Technology	University of Sheffield	Working with leading companies to improve efficiency in aero engines
Medicine and Health	University of York	New disciplines and economics models for efficient healthcare

=== 2009 ===
Category	Winning institution	Rationale
Engineering and Technology	Aberdeen College	Delivering skills in the oil and gas industry and supporting community integration
Environment and Conservation	Aberystwyth University	Plant breeding and genetics for economic, environmental and educational benefit
Humanities, Social Sciences and Law	Cardiff University	Reducing violence in the local community
Education & Training	City College Norwich	A radical new approach in support of learners with Asperger Syndrome
Education and Training	City of Sunderland College	Delivering essential skills in maths and English to the community
Engineering & Technology	Edinburgh Napier University	Innovative housing construction for environmental benefit and quality of life
Medicine and Health	Keele University	Pioneering early intervention and primary care in the management of chronic pain
Medicine and Health	King's College London	International collaborations promoting excellence in mental health care
Environment and Conservation	Lancaster University	Plant science applied to water shortage, crop yield and global food security
Humanities, Social Sciences and Law	London School of Economics & Political Science	Applying research to the advancement of global health and social care policy
Medicine and Health	Newcastle University	Research on ageing, with important implications for health and care
International Engagement	School of Oriental and African Studies	Specialised teaching of a wide range of African, Asian and Middle Eastern languages
Education & Training	Thames Valley University	Pathways to skills, employment and higher education in the hospitality industry
International Engagement	The Open University	A major contribution to primary teacher education in Africa through a large-scale open learning programme (TESSA)
International Engagement	University of East Anglia	Alleviating poverty in developing countries through environmental sustainability
Humanities, Social Sciences & Law	University of Essex	Advancing the legal and broader practice of international human rights
Engineering & Technology	University of Leeds	Forty years' sustained excellence in teaching and applied research in transport
Humanities, Social Sciences & Law	University of Oxford	Museums, libraries and archives in support of research, learning and public education
Humanities, Social Sciences and Law	University of Reading	World-leading archaeology: making the past work for the present
Engineering & Technology	University of Warwick	Long-term educational partnerships supporting UK competitiveness in manufacturing
Humanities, Social Sciences and Law	University of York	A long term contribution to UK social policies to improve the lives of vulnerable people

=== 2011 ===
Category	Winning institution	Rationale
Engineering and Technology	Bournemouth University	World-class computer animation teaching with wide scientific and creative applications
Environment and Conservation	Brunel University of London	Protecting the environment from hormone-disrupting chemicals and pollutants
Education & Training	Coleg Llandrillo Cymru	An original and large-scale approach to high quality training in hospitality and catering
Engineering & Technology	Cranfield University	World-leading work in aviation safety through research and training in air accident investigation
Education & Training	Hackney Community College	Enabling people with mental health needs to gain education and employment skills
Medicine and Health	Queen's University Belfast	Boosting cancer survival rates
International Engagement	South Nottingham College	Education, sports training and volunteering in the community, at home and overseas
Engineering & Technology	University of Manchester	Internationally renowned research and skills training for the nuclear industry
Environment and Conservation	University of Plymouth	Education and research solutions for the global marine sector
Humanities, Social Sciences & Law	University of Bath	Influential applied research into child poverty, and support for vulnerable people
Engineering & Technology	University of Birmingham	New technologies and leadership in formulation engineering in support of UK manufacturing
Medicine and Health	University College London	Internationally distinguished research and pioneering clinical therapy in eye disease
The Arts and Creative Industries	University of East Anglia	Groundbreaking and inventive programmes in creative writing with wide international impact
Engineering & Technology	University of Leeds	Innovative joint replacement and regenerative technologies to improve quality of life
Environment and Conservation	University of Nottingham	A comprehensive and multifaceted approach to global challenges of food security
Environment and Conservation	University of Oxford	Wildlife and environmental conservation: WildCRU’s leading work in applied science and community action
The Arts and Creative Industries	University of Reading	Teaching and design applications in typography, through print and new technologies
Environment and Conservation	University of St Andrews	Research and teaching to promote better governance of the oceans
Engineering & Technology	University of Southampton	Innovation and world-beating expertise in performance sports engineering
Engineering and Technology	University of Surrey	Wide-ranging and global work improving access to safe drinking water and sanitation
Humanities, Social Sciences & Law	University of York	Leading-edge work in archaeology from prehistory to the modern age

=== 2013 ===
Category	Winning institution	Rationale
Environment and Conservation	Cardiff University	Geoenvironmental solutions to major challenges of land, groundwater quality and regeneration
Engineering & Technology	Coleg Cambria	Centre of excellence for aerospace training
Education & Training	Cornwall College	Vocational training for land-based industries empowering and developing the local rural economy
Engineering & Technology	Loughborough University	Research and skills development in High Value Manufacturing creating new products, processes and economic growth
Engineering and Technology	MidKent College	Engineering and construction training for the Army producing a major contribution to the local economy
Humanities, Social Sciences & Law	Northumbria University	The Student Law Office: a distinctive contribution to legal education providing access to justice in the local community
Education & Training	Teesside University	Growing digital business start-ups by graduates and creating entrepreneurship and opportunity in the local economy
Medicine and Health	University of Edinburgh	Extending professional and academic skills in surgery through international online training at Masters level
Humanities, Social Sciences and Law	University of Kent	Improving the quality of life for people with intellectual and developmental disabilities
Engineering & Technology	University of Manchester	Pioneering imaging techniques for advanced materials and manufacturing
The Arts and Creative Industries	University of the Arts London	Industrial and product design contributing to the strength of the creative economy
Humanities, Social Sciences & Law	University of Bedfordshire	Applied research on child sexual exploitation influencing new safeguarding policy and practice
Medicine and Health	University of Bristol	Obstetrics and neonatal practice: saving babies’ lives around the world
Medicine and Health	University College London	Creating the bioprocess engineering base for converting research into new medicines
Medicine and Health	University of Dundee	Research in human anatomy applied to forensic and victim identification worldwide
Environment and Conservation	University of Glasgow	Research on links between human activity and animal ecology, bringing international health benefits
Humanities, Social Sciences & Law	University of Leicester	Inter-connected research and expertise in history, heritage and archaeology, highlighted by the discovery of Richard III
Medicine and Health	University of Oxford	Practical and cost-effective improvements in prevention of stroke
Humanities, Social Sciences and Law	Newcastle University	Long-term research and new strategies for the rural and social economy
Humanities, Social Sciences & Law	University of Stirling	Research into the impact of product marketing on children’s health which has widely influenced international policies

=== 2015 ===
Category	Winning institution	Rationale
Education & Training	Abingdon & Witney College	Courses for horses
Engineering and Technology	Blackpool and The Fylde College	Partnerships for engineering
Engineering and Technology	Bridgwater College	Energy Skills Centre at the heart of local business training
Medicine and Health	Cardiff Metropolitan University	Improving production of prosthetics and implants
Medicine and Health	Cardiff University	Discoveries in schizophrenia, autism, ADHD and Alzheimer's
International Engagement	Cranfield University	Bringing water and sanitation to the poorest parts of the world
Environment and Conservation	Edinburgh Napier University	New standards in timber construction
Engineering & Technology	Heriot-Watt University	Experimental science aiding the oil and gas sector
Engineering and Technology	Lancaster University	Furthering understanding of language
Science and Mathematics	Nottingham Trent University	Research and technology development to improve public security
Engineering & Technology	Queen's University Belfast	Creating jobs whilst protecting citizens and businesses from technology viruses and more
Medicine and Health	University of Edinburgh	Advances in diagnosing coronary heart disease
Medicine and Health	University of Bradford	Improving national care for Dementia patients
Science & Mathematics	University of Bristol	Research into the risks of volcanic activity to aviation
Humanities, Social Sciences and Law	UCL Institute of Education	An international reputation for policy and practice of education and applied work in social science
Environment and Conservation	University of Greenwich	Improving natural resources capacity in Africa
The Arts and Creative Industries	University of Huddersfield	Making an impact in the international music industry
Humanities, Social Sciences & Law	University of Hull	Outstanding research into the history of slavery
Medicine and Health	University of Oxford	Innovations in biomedical engineering
Science & Mathematics	University of Warwick	Applied mathematics helping solve contemporary societal issues
Education & Training	Westminster Kingsway College	Collaboration and innovation in the culinary arts

=== 2017 ===
Category	Winning institution	Rationale
The Arts and Creative Industries	Arts University Bournemouth	Distinguished degree level education in costume design for the UK’s leading creative industries
Environment and Conservation	Cranfield University	Large-scale soil and environmental data for sustainable use of the natural resources in the UK and worldwide
Medicine and Health	Cardiff University	Diagnosis and treatment of vision problems in children with Down syndrome
Engineering & Technology	Harper Adams University	Innovative applications in agricultural engineering and technologies to address UK and global food security
Humanities, Social Sciences & Law	London School of Economics and Political Science	Training, research and policy formation for cities of the future and a new generation of urban leaders in other countries
Medicine and Health	London School of Hygiene and Tropical Medicine	Responding to the Ebola crisis with clinical action, local training and new preventative strategies
The Arts and Creative Industries	National Film and Television School	Specialist training for film and television to provide exceptional and recognised talent for the UK creative economy
Engineering and Technology	Newcastle College	Supporting the development of transport infrastructure in the North of England
Environment and Conservation	Scotland's Rural University College	Managing the environmental impact of dairy cattle
Medicine and Health	Institute of Cancer Research	Pre-eminent work in cancer drug discovery with benefits to patients globally
Medicine and Health	University of Edinburgh	Clinical innovations to respond to major unmet needs in women's health
Medicine and Health	University of Aberdeen	Health service research leading to improvements in academic and clinical practice and delivery of health care
Engineering & Technology	University of Birmingham	Advanced engineering and innovative technology in support of the developing UK rail industry
Medicine and Health	University of Durham	Leading influential research on parent-infant sleep, with a widely used public information service
Environment and Conservation	University of East Anglia	Combined natural, social and environmental sciences to advance understanding and protection of the environment
Humanities, Social Sciences & Law	University of Essex	Authoritative social and economic research to inform the policies of governments for the improvement of people’s lives
Humanities, Social Sciences and Law	University of Glasgow	The Historical Thesaurus of English, a unique resource for scholarship, education and creativity
Medicine and Health	University of Liverpool	A lead role in drug safety, drug design and improvements of existing therapies with outstanding work on HIV
Engineering & Technology	University of Southampton	Innovations in photonics that enhance the global fibre internet, laser manufacturing, next generation computing and new optical technologies
Medicine and Health	University of Surrey	Leading research and teaching in food and nutrition informing public policy on diabetes, obesity, osteoporosis and other dietary related issues
Education & Training	Weston College	Employment and education opportunities for those with special needs and disabilities

=== 2019 ===
Category	Winning institution	Rationale
Engineering and Technology	Belfast Metropolitan College	Driving economic growth through excellent digital IT provisions
The Arts and Creative Industries	Birmingham City University	A shining example for the jewellery industry
Engineering and Technology	Coventry University	A road map to the future for automotive industry graduates
Engineering and Technology	Cranfield University	Experiential learning flies to new heights
Education and Training	Dudley College of Technology	Advanced vocational education sparks a bright future
Humanities, Social Sciences and Law	Heriot-Watt University	Homing in on homelessness
Medicine and Health	King's College London	AI-enabled healthcare provides early patient diagnoses
Engineering and Technology	London South East Colleges	Cementing talent in the housing sector
The Arts and Creative Industries	Manchester Metropolitan University	The power of poetry in embracing cultural diversity
Education and Training	Queen's University Belfast	Shared education nurtures community relations
Environment and Conservation	University of Kent	Protecting the planet's natural diversity
Science and Mathematics	University of Manchester	Supporting the UK's leading position in biotechnology and biomanufacturing
Environment and Conservation	University of Plymouth	World-leading micro-plastics discovery work
Medicine and Health	University of Sheffield	Tackling neuro-degenerative diseases
Engineering and Technology	University of Strathclyde	Pushing the boundaries for clean power
Engineering and Technology	Tyne Coast College	Digital modelling to improve port access and shipping management
Environment and Conservation	University of Exeter	Combatting the effects of marine plastic pollution
Environment and Conservation	University of Greenwich	Wide-ranging work in pest management and control to combat the spread of diseases affecting animals and humans
Engineering and Technology	University of Huddersfield	Keeping the UK on the rails
International Engagement	University of Oxford	A unique framework for tackling global poverty
Environment and Conservation	University of Stirling	Leading aquaculture work for sustainable food production
Science and Mathematics	University of York	Putting proteins at the forefront of industrial biotechnology and new drug approaches

=== 2021 ===
Category	Winning institution	Rationale
Environment and Conservation	University of Aberdeen	Innovations in soil science to combat climate crisis
Medicine and Health	Anglia Ruskin University	Harnessing the power of music to help people living with dementia
Humanities, Social Sciences and Law	University of Bradford	Building the future by rebuilding the past
The Arts and Creative Industries	Chichester College Group	A leader in craft skills for furniture-making and upholstery
Engineering and Technology	Exeter College	National impact in digital educational technology
Medicine and Health	University of Glasgow	International research centre accelerating virology capability
Engineering and Technology	Grimsby Institute (The TEC Partnership)	Transforming lives through digital skills training
Engineering and Technology	Heriot-Watt University	Pioneering photonics with global impact
Engineering and Technology	University of Huddersfield	Cutting-edge manufacturing providing smart solutions
Medicine and Health	Imperial College London	Critical modelling and research in the face of the global COVID pandemic
Environment and Conservation	University of Leeds	Equipping communities against climate challenges
Medicine and Health	London School of Hygiene and Tropical Medicine	Empowering alumni to save lives
Environment and Conservation	London School of Economics and Political Science	Providing a multi-disciplinary response to climate change
Education and Training	The Manchester College	A mission to support social mobility
The Arts and Creative Industries	Nottingham Trent University	Advancing cultural heritage science
Medicine and Health	University of Oxford	Life-saving rapid response to COVID-19
Environment and Conservation	University of Reading	Connecting communities with climate change
Environment and Conservation	South West College	Leading the way in the green economy
Engineering and Technology	University of Strathclyde	Driving innovation and job creation in advanced manufacturing
Environment and Conservation	Swansea University	Revolutionising applications for renewable energy
Engineering and Technology	Warwickshire College	Bridging skill gaps in industry

=== 2023 ===
Category	Winning institution	Rationale
Medicine and Health	Aberystwyth University	Protecting people, animals and economies from harmful parasitic worms
The Arts and Creative Industries	University of the Arts London	Shaping the fashion industry of the future
Medicine and Health	Bangor University	Wastewater-based monitoring: a holistic approach
Engineering and Technology	University of Birmingham	Supporting sustainable UK manufacturing of aero-engines
Education and Training	Bridgwater and Taunton College	Nursing home-grown talent
Education and Training	City College Plymouth	Leading the way for the UK on marine and maritime skills
Education and Training	City of Glasgow College	Saving seafarers' lives by tackling oxygen depletion in enclosed spaces
Education and Training	University of Glasgow	Editing and curating Robert Burns for the 21st century
Education and Training	Hopwood Hall College & University Centre	Widening participation of 16-18 year olds in education
Medicine and Health	Institute of Cancer Research	Transforming lives through world-leading breast cancer research
Education and Training	Lakes College West Cumbria	Developing highly skilled technicians for nuclear and low carbon energy
Engineering and Technology	University of Lincoln	Innovation in agri-food technology
Science and Mathematics	University of Liverpool	Pioneering chemistry research for the benefit of society
Medicine and Health	Liverpool School of Tropical Medicine	Tiny Targets: vector control for the elimination of sleeping sickness
Education and Training	Loughborough College	World-class space engineering programme
Environment and Conservation	Newcastle University	Research programme of global excellence in water security
Education and Training	The Open University	Online distance-learning at scale
Engineering and Technology	University of Oxford	Innovation in autonomous robotics
Education and Training	Plumpton College	Growth and sustainability of skills for the UK wine industry
Medicine and Health	Scotland's Rural College	Improving animal health and welfare through excellence in veterinary services
Engineering and Technology	University of Strathclyde	Excellence, innovation and entrepreneurship in photonics
Science and Mathematics	Swansea University	Harnessing public data to improve population health and wellbeing

=== 2025 ===
Winning institution	Rationale
University of Edinburgh	Fire safety research and education
Gateshead College	Built environment education
Hull College	Transforming refugee and migrant integration
Institute of Cancer Research	Global leadership in radiotherapy research
Lancaster University	Hands-on computing for children
University of Leeds	Using textiles to tackle questions of industry, healthcare and sustainability
Leeds Beckett University	Educational alliance at HM Prison Full Sutton
Liverpool John Moores University	Pioneering craniofacial analysis
London Metropolitan University	Child and Woman Abuse Studies Unit
Loughborough University	Pioneering research enhancing performance, wellbeing and inclusion for para and disability sport
Newcastle University	Transforming understanding, diagnosis and care in Dementia with Lewy bodies
North Warwickshire and South Leicestershire College	MIRA Technology Institute
North West Regional College	Developing skills, fostering innovation and driving applied research for industry
University of Nottingham	Slavery from space: using satellites to tackle modern slavery
University of Oxford	OpenSAFELY platform for whole population NHS data
Royal College of Music	Shaping the future of music education through applied performance science
University of Salford	Energy House Labs
Scotland's Rural College	Informing and shaping agricultural policy through economic analysis
University of Southampton	Leading research for a sustainable and resilient rail system

== See also ==
- Queen's Awards
