= Jerome Vanclay =

Australian academic

Jerome Klaas Vanclay is an Australian academic. He is currently a Professor for Sustainable Forestry at Southern Cross University (SCU), and a coordinator in IUFRO.

== Career ==
Jerry Vanclay is currently the professor of sustainable forestry in the School of Environment, Science and Engineering at Southern Cross University and served as and dean of science and head of school for 11 years. Vanclay received a doctorate (D.Sc.For.) from the University of Queensland in 1992. Before joining SCU, Vanclay was principal scientist with the Center for International Forestry Research (CIFOR), and professor of tropical forestry at the Royal Veterinary and Agricultural University in Copenhagen, Denmark. He leads SCU's research program in decision support systems for forest management (including growth modelling and yield prediction) and teaches forest management. He is a member of the Southern Cross Group and chaired (2004–09) the Expert Independent Advisory Panel to the Minister of the Sustainability and Environment in Victoria (Australia).

== Awards ==
Vanclay was awarded the Queen's Award for Forestry in 1997, and the IUFRO Scientific Achievement Award in 2010. He is a fellow of the Royal Society of New South Wales.

== Publications ==
His research interests focus on information systems for forestry and land use management. He has written over 350 publications, at least 130 of which appear in refereed journals. He wrote the definitive text on forest growth modelling, Modelling Forest Growth and Yield, and serves on the editorial boards of several journals, including Small-scale Forestry and Forest Biometry, Modelling and Information Sciences. His most recent book Realizing Community Futures deals with participatory modelling to resolve natural resource conflicts.
