= Joanne Whittaker =

Australian marine geophysicist

- Education: University of Sydney
- Occupation: Marine geophysicist
- Scientific career
- Workplaces: University of Tasmania
- Thesis: "Tectonic consequences of mid-ocean ridge evolution and subduction"
- Website: www.utas.edu.au/profiles/staff/imas/joanne-whittaker

Joanne Whittaker is a marine geophysicist, from the Institute for Marine and Antarctic Studies at the University of Tasmania, who was awarded the Dorothy Hill award in 2017, and a L'Oreal Women in Science Fellowship in 2013. Her research contributes to understanding the structure and evolution of the Earth.

== Career ==
Whittaker obtained a Bachelor of Science (hons)/ Bachelor of Commerce from the University of Sydney in 2003, followed by a Masters of Geophysics in 2005, from the University of Wellington. Her thesis was titled "Late Tertiary vertical movements and sedimentation". She obtained a PhD from the University of Sydney, in 2008.

Whittaker has conducted research in geophysics, including understanding the structure and evolution of the Earth. This involves examining deep and surface processes and the relationships between them. Whittaker's work has provided an understanding around the geological history of the planet, including investigating the breakup of supercontinent, known as Pangaea. She has also investigated and published research around the evolution of ocean basins in the regions surrounding Australia. Whittaker has also been an Honorary Research Fellow, from 2008–present at the University of Leeds, UK.

== Publications ==
- Anders McCarthy; Luca Magri; Isabel Sauermilch; et al. (2022). "The Louisiade ophiolite: A missing link in the western Pacific". Terra Nova. 34 (2): 146–154. doi:10.1111/ter.12578. Wikidata Q113456959.
- Nathan R Daczko; Jacqueline Halpin; Ian C W Fitzsimons; Joanne M Whittaker (2018). "A cryptic Gondwana-forming orogen located in Antarctica". Scientific Reports. 8 (1): 8371. doi:10.1038/s41598-018-26530-1. PMC 5976760. PMID 29849064. Wikidata Q54941194.
- J.M. Whittaker; S.E. Williams; J.A. Halpin; T.J. Wild; J.D. Stilwell; F. Jourdan; N.R. Daczko (2016). "Eastern Indian Ocean microcontinent formation driven by plate motion changes". Earth and Planetary Science Letters. 454: 203–212. Bibcode:2016E&PSL.454..203W. doi:10.1016/j.epsl.2016.09.019. Wikidata Q63389174.
- Howie D Scher; Joanne M Whittaker; Simon Williams; Jennifer C Latimer; Wendy E C Kordesch; Margaret L Delaney (2015). "Onset of Antarctic Circumpolar Current 30 million years ago as Tasmanian Gateway aligned with westerlies". Nature. 523 (7562): 580–583. doi:10.1038/nature14598. PMID 26223626. Wikidata Q46420036.

== Awards ==
- 2017: Dorothy Hill Award from the Australian Academy of Science
- 2013: L'Oreal Women in Science Fellowship
- 2010: NSW Tall Poppy Award
- 2007: Post-graduate award from University of Sydney
