= Andréa Sardinha Taschetto =

Climate change scientist

- Education: University of São Paulo
- Occupation: Climate researcher
- Employer: University of New South Wales
- Known for: Atmospheric research
- Title: Associate Professor
- Website: research.unsw.edu.au/people/associate-professor-andrea-sardinha-taschetto

Andréa Sardinha Taschetto or A. S. Taschetto; Andréa Taschetto is a climate change scientist at the University of New South Wales, and winner of the Dorothy Hill award. She was awarded an Australian Research Council Future Fellowship in 2016. Her research has contributed to improved understanding of the role of oceans, on climate variability at regional scales, and from seasonal to mulit-decade timescales. This research also has assisted with future climate projections.

== Education ==
Taschetto obtained a Bachelor of Science in physics, a Masters of Science and a PhD in Physical Oceanography from the University of São Paulo in Brazil.

== Career ==
Taschetto has conducted research in climate systems science, and in understanding both large-scale oceanographic and atmospheric phenomena in the Indian and Pacific Oceans, as well as the impact of these upon regional climates. She has conducted research on regional climate dynamics and global modes of climate variability, including research on the El Niño Modoki phenomenon. She specialises in researching the role of the oceans and their impacts on regional climate variability, including seasonal and multi-decadal timescales, as well as conducting research on future climate projections.

She has published her work on the Atlantic Ocean and La Nina climatology work in The Conversation, with colleagues from the University of New South Wales. She received an ARC Future Fellowship for $652,000, in 2016 for her work on the impacts of drought and floods, including forecasting of climate, which will enable improved understanding of socio-economic impacts of climate extremes.

== Publications ==
Taschetto has over 50 publications in various international journals, including Nature Climate Change. Select publications include:

- AS Taschetto, MH England (2019) El Niño modoki impacts on Australian rainfall Journal of Climate 22 (11), 3167–3174. doi.org/10.1175/2008JCLI2589.1
- AS Taschetto, AS Gupta, NC Jourdain, A Santoso, CC Ummenhofer, et al. (2014) Cold tongue and warm pool ENSO events in CMIP5: mean state and future projections. Journal of Climate 27 (8), 2861–2885. doi.org/10.1175/JCLI-D-13-00437
- AS Taschetto, MH England (2009) An analysis of late twentieth century trends in Australian rainfall. International Journal of Climatology: A Journal of the Royal Meteorological 29: 6. 791–807... doi.org/10.1002/joc.173.

Taschetto has also been cited in the Brazilian Journal of Oceanography.

== Media ==
Taschetto has commented on the impact of La Nina and impacts on Australian weather systems, in various media, including The Conversation, and The New Daily. The media has also covered her work on the Atlantic Ocean. including Seven news. She has contributed various articles to The Conversation, on the Indian Ocean Diopole, Atlantic Ocean currents, and the 2015 El Nino and its impact on Australian weather. She was interviewed for her work on unseasonably cold and wetter summers, on 2NM.

== Awards ==
- 2021 - Outstanding Associate Editor Award, Journal of Southern Hemisphere Earth Systems Science (JSHESS).
- 2017 - ARC Future Fellowship
- 2017 - CHyCle Award at the 1st Electronic Conference on the Hydrological Cycle
- 2016 - Australian Academy of Science Dorothy Hill Award for excellence in Earth sciences research.
- 2009 - UNSW Gold Star Award jointly with A. Sen Gupta and C.C. Ummenhofer
