= Tracy Ainsworth =

Marine biologist

- Education: Bachelor of Science James Cook University, Master of Science James Cook University, Doctor of Philosophy University of Queensland awarded with Deans List for Research Excellence.
- Occupation: Scientist
- Employer: University of New South Wales
- Known for: Marine Science

Tracy Ainsworth is a marine biologist and Scientia Professor at the University of New South Wales, working on coral reefs, and the biology of the Great Barrier Reef. Her research covers the biology of stresses, cells, disease, immunity and symbiosis. She was awarded the Dorothy Hill Medal for science, from the Australian Academy of Science, for research on coral reef, stresses and impacts of temperature on coral health.

== Career ==
Ainsworth's career has examined impacts of environmental stress on corals, particularly reef-building corals, together with the interactions between hosts and microbe. She also studies symbioses and disease outbreaks. Research around bacterial associates of corals opened up knowledge around the mechanisms of coral diseases, how these occur and what causes them to progress.

Ainsworth has also identified a range of novel intracellular bacteria which may play a role in the success of corals. She has also examined the impacts of rising temperatures, and climate change, and how this will affect coral both at present, and in future climates. Ainsworth has published studies on the impacts of rising water temperatures on corals.

== Publications ==
Selected peer-reviewed journal articles include the following:

- Ainsworth, Tracy D., andGates, Ruth D. (2016) Corals’ microbial sentinels: the coral microbiome will be key to future reef health. Science, 352 (6293). pp. 1518–1519.
- Kelly, Lisa A., Heintz, Tom, Lamb, Joleah B., Ainsworth, Tracy D., and Willis, Bette L. (2016) Ecology and pathology of novel plaque-like growth anomalies affecting a reef-building coral on the Great Barrier Reef. Frontiers in Marine Science, 3. pp. 1–12.
- Ainsworth, Tracy D., Heron, Scott F., Ortiz, Juan Carlos, Mumby, Peter J., Grech, Alana, Ogawa, Daisie, Eakin, C. Mark, and Leggat, William (2016) Climate change disables coral bleaching protection on the Great Barrier Reef. Science, 352 (6283). pp. 338–342.

She has also published a book:

- Graham NAJ; Ainsworth TD; Baird AH; Ban NC; Bay LK; Cinner JE; De Freitas DM; Diaz-Pulido G; Dornelas M; Dunn SR; Fidelman PIJ; Foret S; Good TC; Kool J; Mallela J; Penin L; Pratchett MS; Williamson DH, 2011, From microbes to people: Tractable benefits of no-take areas for coral reefs.

== Media ==
Ainsworth has published on coral reefs and marine science within The Conversation, where together with researchers from other Australian universities, she described the impacts of coral bleaching, in the Lord Howe Island Marine Park. She has also had her work described by the ABC.

== Awards ==
- 2018 - Dorothy Hill Medal
- 2012 - ARC Super Science Fellow (2012–2015)
- 2011 - L'Oreal Women in Science Fellowship.
