= Kenvale College of Tourism & Hospitality Management =

Kenvale College of Hospitality, Cookery and Events
- Motto: "Knowledge. Experience. Humanity."
- Type: Private
- Established: 1971
- Affiliations: Radisson Hotels, University of Notre Dame, Sydney, University of Technology Sydney, The Hotel School Sydney
- Location: Sydney, New South Wales, Australia; 33.916163°S 151.235609°E
- Nickname: Kenvale College

The Kenvale College of Hospitality & Cookery and Events was a private college for students interested in Commercial Cookery, Event Management and/or Hospitality.

It was located in Randwick, New South Wales and was opposite the University of New South Wales. The college claimed to be the first school of hospitality in Australia founded in 1971.
