= Ailie Gallant =

Australian drought expert

- Education: Monash University
- Occupation: Scientist
- Employer: Monash University
- Known for: Drought research
- Website: http://www.ailiegallant.com/.html

Ailie Gallant is an Australian climate scientist and expert in drought and precipitation variability research. She was awarded the Dorothy Hill Medal by the Australian Academy of Science in 2024, experience in science communication.

== Career ==
Much of Gallant's education and research involves climate variability and climate extremes of the Southern Hemisphere. She has focussed on climate extremes including drought, extreme heat and heavy rainfall.

Gallant worked at the University of Melbourne, and in 2024 was an associate professor at Monash University, and the Monash Node Lead of the National Environmental Science Program Climate Systems Hub. Gallant is a Chief Investigator of the ARC Centre of Excellence of 21st Century Weather.

In 2025–26 she was a mentor in the Superstars of STEM program run by Science & Technology Australia.

== Education ==
Gallant received an honours degree from Monash University, and in 2009, she received a PhD for her thesis titled "Trends in extremes of the Australian Climate", also from Monash. She worked at the University of Melbourne (2009–2011) and University of Washington (2011–2012) in post-doctoral positions.

== Publications ==
- 2016 – Gallant, A. J. E. and S. C. Lewis: Stochastic and anthropogenic influences on repeated record-breaking temperature extremes in Australian spring of 2013 and 2014. Geophysical Research Letters, doi: 10.1002/2016GL067740.
- 2014 – Ding, Q., Wallace, J., Battisti, D. et al. Tropical forcing of the recent rapid Arctic warming in northeastern Canada and Greenland. Nature 509, 209–212 (2014). doi: 10.1038/nature13260.

== Media ==
Gallant has been in the media regularly, including on the ABC radio, and The Conversation, discussing cyclones, weather, El Nino, climate action, climate change and mental health, and other climate related topics.

Gallant has over 15 articles in The Conversation include topics including passing 1.5 degrees, flash droughts, poor health resulting from climate change, weather records, and humidity in cities like Brisbane.

== Awards ==
- 2024 – Dorothy Hill Medal from the Australian Academy of Science.
- 2015 – Victorian Tall Poppy Award for excellence in science communication.
- 2014 – ARC DECRA for ‘Rethinking Australian drought risk, its long-term variability and processes’.
- 2014 – Eureka Prize for Excellence in Interdisciplinary Scientific Research. Team prize.
- 2007 – Best Student Paper at 14th national Conference of the Australian Meteorological and Oceanographic Society.
