= Lisa Alexander (earth scientist) =

Australian professor and climatologist

Lisa V. Alexander
- Education: Monash University
- Occupation: Climate scientist
- Known for: Climate research, heat waves and extreme weather
- Scientific career
- Institutions: University of New South Wales
- Thesis: Extreme measures: mechanisms driving changes in climate extremes in Australia (2009)
- Website: https://research.unsw.edu.au/people/professor-lisa-alexander

Lisa Victoria Alexander is an Australian professor and climatologist, with a specific focus on heat waves. She received the Dorothy Hill Medal for her research on climate extremes, the frequency and intensity of heat waves. Her research has provided evidence that the frequency and intensity of heat waves will be influenced by the quantity of anthropogenic greenhouse gas emissions, in particular carbon dioxide. She was a contributing author to the Intergovernmental Panel on Climate Change (IPCC) reports, including the fifth assessment report.

== Education and career ==
Alexander was awarded a Bachelor of Science in 1995 and Master of Science, in 1998 in the field of Applied Mathematics at Queens University in Northern Ireland. Alexander worked as a research scientist at the Met Office Hadley Centre in the Climate Variability Group from 1998 to 2006. The final year she was seconded to the Australian Bureau of Meteorology.

Alexander was awarded her PhD from Monash University, (2009), where she won the Mollie Holman medal for her doctoral thesis. From 2009, she was employed at UNSW, within the Climate Change Research Centre.

In 2013 she was awarded the Dorothy Hill Medal for her research on how future changes in the intensity and frequency of heat waves will strongly be influenced by the quantity of greenhouse gas emissions. She has also collaborated with Sarah Perkins-Kirkpatrick, another Australian scientist studying heat waves.

Alexander's has worked with the World Meteorological Organization's (WMO) Expert Team on Climate Change Detection and Indices (ETCCDI) on topics including the assessment and production of international datasets of rainfall and temperature and climate extremes. She has also worked with the Expert Team on Climate Information for Decisionmaking (ET-CID).

Alexander led development of Climpact software, which is used to analyse and compute climate extremes. The Climpact software is utilised by National Hydrological and Meteorological Services in addition to other climate researchers internationally. Alexander is a member of the Joint Scientific Committee of the World Climate Research Program.

She is also a member of the GEWEX Scientific Steering Group, and on the executive committee of the International Association of Meteorology and Atmospheric Sciences (IAMAS).

== Publications ==
As of 2022, Alexander had over 170 journal articles, on a range of topics including climate extremes, temperature and precipitation. She was an author of the IPCC assessments in both 2001 and 2007. She contributed to the 2012 Special Report on Extremes, and Alexander was also a Lead Author of the IPCC's Fifth Assessment Report. Some of her select publications, including her most highly cited research, include the following:

- Alexander, L. V.; Zhang, X.; Peterson, T. C.; Caesar, J.; Gleason, B.; Klein Tank, A. M. G.; Haylock, M.; Collins, D.; Trewin, B.; Rahimzadeh, F.; Tagipour, A. (2006). "Global observed changes in daily climate extremes of temperature and precipitation". Journal of Geophysical Research. 111 (D5): D05109. Bibcode:2006JGRD..111.5109A. doi:10.1029/2005JD006290. hdl:20.500.12110/paper_01480227_v111_n5_p_Alexander. ISSN 0148-0227. S2CID 15806993.
- Perkins, S. E.; Alexander, L. V. (1 July 2013). "On the Measurement of Heat Waves". Journal of Climate. 26 (13): 4500–4517. Bibcode:2013JCli...26.4500P. doi:10.1175/JCLI-D-12-00383.1. hdl:1959.4/53713. ISSN 0894-8755. S2CID 129438880.
- Alexander, Lisa V.; Arblaster, Julie M. (15 March 2009). "Assessing trends in observed and modelled climate extremes over Australia in relation to future projections". International Journal of Climatology. 29 (3): 417–435. Bibcode:2009IJCli..29..417A. doi:10.1002/joc.1730. S2CID 140170320.

== Awards and honours ==
Year	Award
2024	Copernicus Medal
2023	Highly Cited Researcher in the field of Geosciences
2022	Highly Cited Researcher in the field of Geosciences
2021	Highly Cited Researcher in the field of Geosciences
2020	Highly Cited Researcher in the field of Cross-Field
2013	Dorothy Hill Medal from Australian Academy of Science
2009	Mollie Holman medal for best doctoral thesis

== Media ==
Alexander has published several articles in The Conversation, as well as ScienceDaily.
