= Southern Cross Group (Australia) =

Australian conservation organisation

The Southern Cross Group of Forest Researchers and Practitioners (the Southern Cross Group for short) is a group of individuals with experience and expertise in forestry and forest ecology, who work to foster better management of Australia's native forests.

== Goals ==
In their 2006 report, the Southern Cross Group advocated incentives to encourage private landholders:

- to retain and foster more native trees on their land,
- to allow and stimulate these trees to reach larger sizes,
- to report the presence of endangered plants and animals on their land, and
- to provide more habitat for these endangered species.

== Members ==
The Southern Cross Group includes:

- Dr Jerry Vanclay - Professor of Sustainable Forestry, Southern Cross University
- Mr David Thompson, Centre for Agricultural & Regional Economics Pty Ltd
- Prof. Jeff Sayer, formerly Prince Bernhard Chair of International Nature Conservation, Utrecht University
- Dr Jeff McNeely, Chief Scientist, World Conservation Union (IUCN)
- Dr David Kaimowitz, Director General, Center for International Forestry Research
- Mr Alex Jay, Branch President, Australian Forest Growers
- Ms Anne Gibbs, Community Natural Resource Management Support Officer
- Mrs Heather Crompton, past President, Institute of Foresters of Australia
- Mr David Cameron, Committee Member, NSW Farmers’ Association
- Dr Ian Bevege, Member, Institute of Foresters of Australia
