= Sandra McLaren =

Australian geologist

Sandra McLaren is an Australian geologist.

Interested in geology and geothermal energy from a young age, McLaren completed her PhD at the University of Adelaide in 2001 and was an associate professor at the University of Melbourne until 2023. She is a noted science communicator and educator, especially on the topic of sustainable energy through hot rocks in southern Australia.

In 2008, McLaren received a Victorian Young Tall Poppy Award, and attended the inaugural InterAcademy Panel meeting for Young Scientists. In 2008 she received the Australian Academy of Science's Dorothy Hill award. The same year, she and Professor Mike Sandford received a grant from the Australian Research Council to research the mechanics of hot rocks and subsequently the potential for geothermal energy in Australia. She was a member of the Global Young Academy.
