= Jacqueline Hey =

Australian banker and current chairwoman of Bendigo and Adelaide Bank

- Born: Jacqueline Cherie Hey; Australia
- Education: University of Melbourne; Southern Cross University
- Occupations: Banker, director
- Known for: first woman director of Cricket Australia

Jacqueline Cherie Hey (also known as Jacquie Hey), is an Australian banker and also the current chairperson of the Bendigo and Adelaide Bank. She is also currently serving on the Boards of Qantas and AGL Energy. She is also serving as a council member at Brighton Grammar School and a member of the Australian Institute of Company Directors.

== Biography ==
Jacquie grew up in a small town on the Bellarine Peninsula where she spent most of her childhood. She pursued her primary education at a school in Wallington near Geelong. She obtained her undergraduate degree from the University of Melbourne and pursued her graduate degree from Southern Cross University.

== Career ==
She joined the Director Board of the Bendigo and Adelaide Bank in 2011. She served as the CEO of Ericsson Australia and Ericsson UK for a short stint before joining in as one of the first three independent directors of Cricket Australia during an Annual general meeting in 2012. She also became the first female director of Cricket Australia.

She also joined the Board of Directors of Qantas in August 2013 and became one of the members of the audit committee of Qantas. She then joined the director board of the Australian Foundation Investment Company in 2013 and served on the board until 2019. She was inducted into the Board of Directors of AGL Energy with effect from 21 March 2016. She was also named in contention for the position of chairperson of Cricket Australia in November 2018 following the resignation of David Reever aftermath of the 2018 Australian ball tampering scandal.

On 30 May 2019, she was officially appointed as the chairperson of the Bendigo and Adelaide Bank at the age of 53. She officially assumed her duties as chairperson of the Bendigo and Adelaide Bank with effect from 29 October 2019 after the annual meeting. On 30 October 2020, Hey formally quit the director board of Cricket Australia following the resignation of Michael Kasprowicz in June 2020.
