= Dorothy Hill Medal =

Australian award for earth sciences research by women

The Dorothy Hill Medal is awarded annually and honours the contributions of Dorothy Hill to Australian Earth science and her work in opening up tertiary science education to women.

The award supports research in the Earth sciences by female researchers up to 10 years post doctorate for research carried out mainly in Australia.

Prior to 2018 the award was known as the Dorothy Hill Award.

== Recipients ==
Source: Australian Academy of Science

Year	Recipient	Citation extract	Ref
2026	Caroline Eakin	Seismology and tectonic plates	
2025	Linda Armbrecht	Ancient DNA and polar climate	
2024	Ailie Gallant	Investigating the origins of droughts	
2023	Raffaella Demichelis	Decoding the chemistry of minerals	
2022	Samintha Perera	Discovering the unique interaction between coal seams and supercritical carbon dioxide and the resulting impacts on underground applications.	
2021	Sarah Perkins-Kirkpatrick	Major contribution to studying heatwaves and their definition, their observed trends, future changes, underpinning physical drivers, and the role of anthropogenic influence behind observed events.	
2020	Rebecca Carey	Submarine Volcanism	
2019	Laurie Menviel	Major contributions to our understanding of the oceanic circulation, its variability and its impact on global climate, the carbon cycle and the cryosphere.	
2018	Tracy Ainsworth	Impact of environmental stress on reef-building corals, their host-microbe interactions, symbioses and disease outbreaks, bacterial associates of corals.	
2017	Joanne Whittaker	Fundamental contributions to understanding of the relationships between deep and surface processe, a new framework for understanding the breakup of supercontinent Pangaea, particularly the evolution of the ocean basins surrounding Australia.	
2016	Andréa Sardinha Taschetto	Major contributions to the understanding of large-scale oceanographic/atmospheric phenomena in the tropical Pacific and Indian Oceans.	
2015	Nerilie Abram	Pioneering research addressing the past behaviour of the Earth's climate system, and implications for anthropogenic climate change.	
2014	Maria Seton	Significant contributions to global plate tectonics, longterm sea-level change, global geodynamics and back-arc basin formation, redefined tectonic plate reconstructions.	
2013	Lisa Alexander	How climate extremes are changing globally and over Australia, providing convincing evidence that future changes in the frequency and intensity of heatwaves in Australia will be strongly dependent on the amount of anthropogenic greenhouse gas emissions.	
2012	Karen H. Black	Continent-wide research focused on the evolution of Australia's mammals, correlating changes over time with global palaeoclimatic events to provide new evidence-based understanding about current and probable future climate-driven changes in Australian biodiversity.	
2011	Kirsten Benkendorff	Significant advances across environmental research, aquaculture and human health.	
2010	Nicole Webster	Reef bacterial symbiotic relationships and the impact of environmental stressors, discovery of a response of spawning corals to bacterial biofilms.	
2009	Daniela Rubatto	Discovered a key relationship that exists in high grade metamorphic rocks between the timing of mineral growth, and the geochemical signature in Ubearing accessory minerals.	
2008	Sandra McLaren	Contributions to the understanding of continental tectonics, thermochronology, microstructural and basin analysis.	
2007	Leanne Armand	Comprehensive taxonomic treatment of Southern Ocean diatom, added rigour to the study of diatoms by applying statistical analysis, increasing the degree of confidence in the reconstruction of sea water temperatures of the past.	
2006	Adriana Dutkiewicz	Exceptional contributions to early Precambrian petroleum geology, the first to discover oil inclusions preserved in Archaean and early Precambrian rocks and to demonstrate that primordial biomass was sufficiently abundant to generate hydrocarbon, shown that eukaryotes survived extreme climatic events including higher temperatures than previously accepted.	
2005	Madeleine van Oppen		
2004	Susan Wijffels		
2003	Kate Trinajstic		
2002	A. D. George		

== See also ==
- List of earth sciences awards
