= Sedimentology =

Study of natural sediments and their formation processes

Sedimentology encompasses the study of modern sediments such as sand, silt, and clay, and the processes that result in their formation (erosion and weathering), transport, deposition and diagenesis. Sedimentologists apply their understanding of modern processes to interpret geologic history through observations of sedimentary rocks and sedimentary structures. Sedimentology is a subdiscipline of geology.

Sedimentary rocks cover up to 75% of the Earth's surface, record much of the Earth's history, and harbor the fossil record. Sedimentology is closely linked to stratigraphy, the study of the physical and temporal relationships between rock layers or strata.

The premise that the processes affecting the earth today are the same as in the past is the basis for determining how sedimentary features in the rock record were formed. By comparing similar features today to features in the rock record—for example, by comparing modern sand dunes to dunes preserved in ancient aeolian sandstones—geologists reconstruct past environments.

== Sedimentary rock types ==
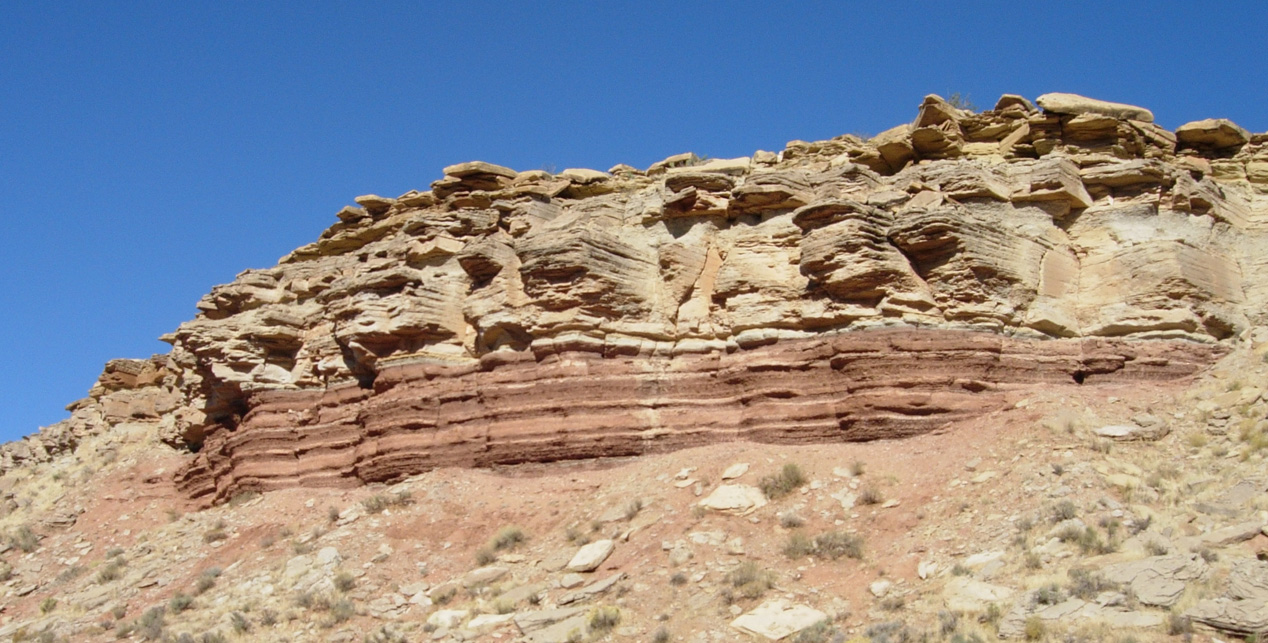
Middle Triassic marginal marine sequence of siltstones and sandstones, southwestern Utah.

There are four primary types of sedimentary rocks: clastics, carbonates, evaporites, and chemical.

- Clastic rocks are composed of particles derived from the weathering and erosion of precursor rocks and consist primarily of fragmental material. Clastic rocks are classified according to their predominant grain size and their composition. In the past, the term "Clastic Sedimentary Rocks" were used to describe silica-rich clastic sedimentary rocks, however there have been cases of clastic carbonate rocks. The more appropriate term is siliciclastic sedimentary rocks.
  - Organic sedimentary rocks are important deposits formed from the accumulation of biological detritus, and form coal and oil shale deposits, and are typically found within basins of clastic sedimentary rocks
- Carbonates are composed of various carbonate minerals (most often calcium carbonate (CaCO_{3})) precipitated by a variety of organic and inorganic processes.
- Evaporites are formed through the evaporation of water at the Earth's surface and most commonly include halite or gypsum.
- Chemical sedimentary rocks, including some carbonates, are deposited by precipitation of minerals from aqueous solution. These include jaspilite and chert.

== Importance of sedimentary rocks ==
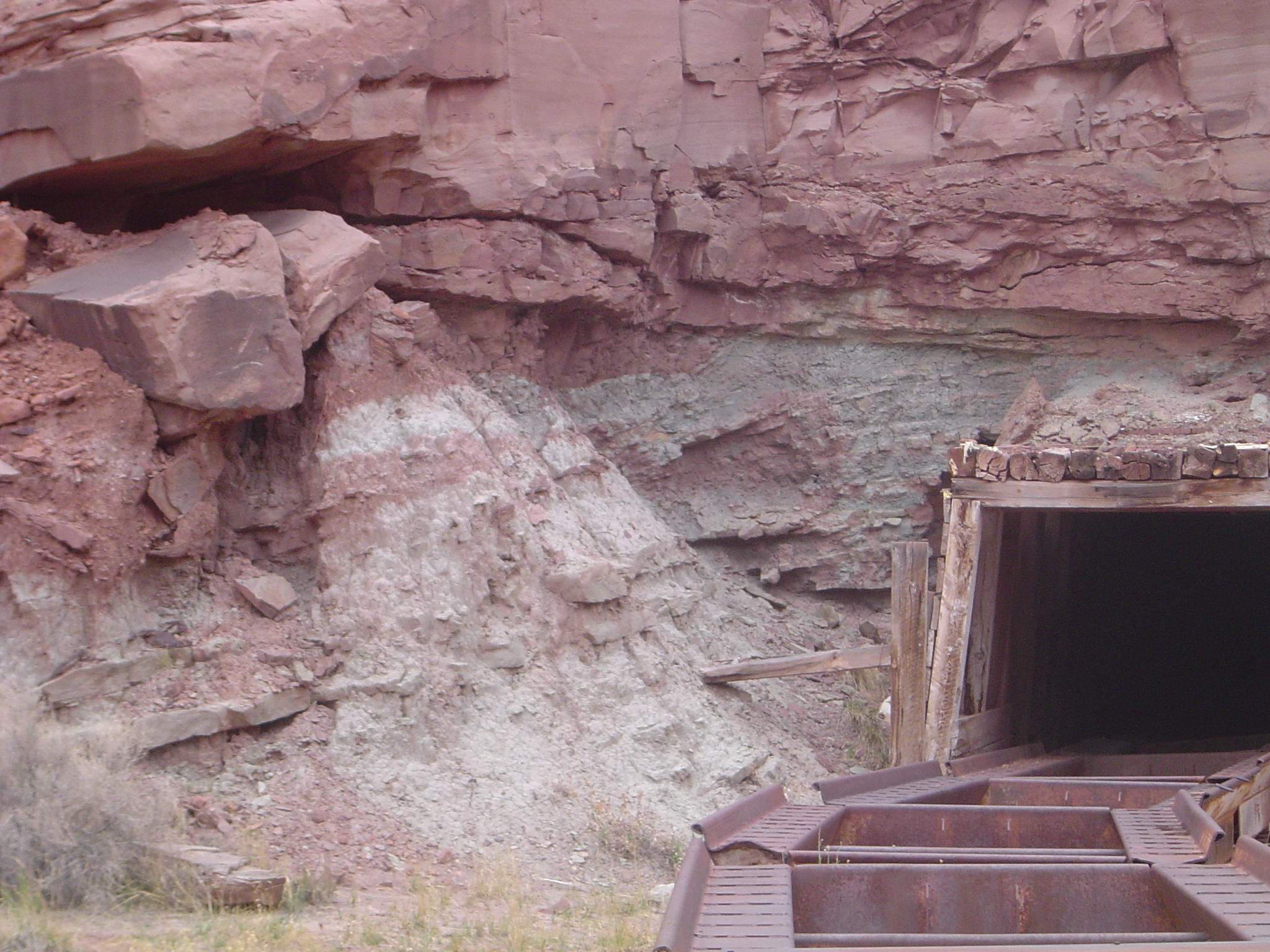
Mi Vida uranium mine in redox mudstones near Moab, Utah

Sedimentary rocks provide a multitude of products which modern and ancient society has come to utilise.

- Art: marble, although a metamorphosed limestone, is an example of the use of sedimentary rocks in the pursuit of aesthetics and art
- Architectural uses: stone derived from sedimentary rocks is used for dimension stone and in architecture, notably slate (metamorphosed shale) for roofing, sandstone for load-bearing buttresses
- Ceramics and industrial materials: clay for pottery and ceramics including bricks; cement and lime derived from limestone.
- Economic geology: sedimentary rocks host large deposits of SEDEX ore deposits of lead-zinc-silver, large deposits of copper, deposits of gold, tungsten, Uranium, and many other precious minerals, gemstones and industrial minerals including heavy mineral sands ore deposits
- Energy: petroleum geology relies on the capacity of sedimentary rocks to generate deposits of petroleum oils. Coal and oil shale are found in sedimentary rocks. A large proportion of the world's uranium energy resources are hosted within sedimentary successions.
- Groundwater: sedimentary rocks contain a large proportion of the Earth's groundwater aquifers. Our understanding of the extent of these aquifers and how much water can be withdrawn from them depends critically on our knowledge of the rocks that hold them (the reservoir).

== Basic principles ==
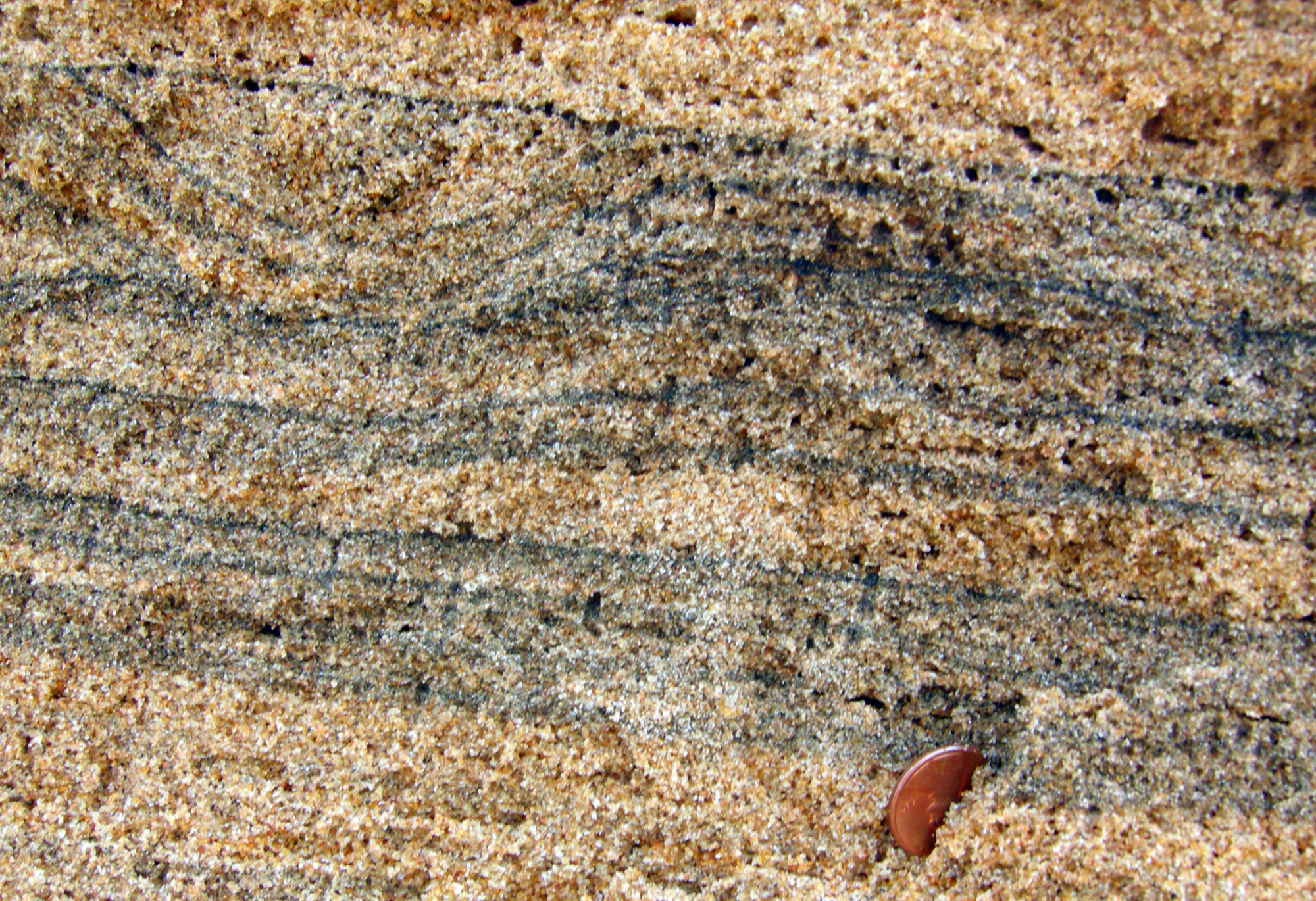
Heavy minerals (dark) deposited in a quartz beach sand (Chennai, India).

The aim of sedimentology, studying sediments, is to derive information on the depositional conditions which acted to deposit the rock unit, and the relation of the individual rock units in a basin into a coherent understanding of the evolution of the sedimentary sequences and basins, and thus, the Earth's geological history as a whole.

The scientific basis of this is the principle of uniformitarianism, which states that the sediments within ancient sedimentary rocks were deposited in the same way as sediments which are being deposited at the Earth's surface today.

Sedimentological conditions are recorded within the sediments as they are laid down; the form of the sediments at present reflects the events of the past and all events which affect the sediments, from the source of the sedimentary material to the stresses enacted upon them after diagenesis are available for study.

The principle of superposition is critical to the interpretation of sedimentary sequences, and in older metamorphic terrains or fold and thrust belts where sediments are often intensely folded or deformed, recognising younging indicators or graded bedding is critical to interpretation of the sedimentary section and often the deformation and metamorphic structure of the region.

Folding in sediments is analysed with the principle of original horizontality, which states that sediments are deposited at their angle of repose which, for most types of sediment, is essentially horizontal. Thus, when the younging direction is known, the rocks can be "unfolded" and interpreted according to the contained sedimentary information.

The principle of lateral continuity states that layers of sediment initially extend laterally in all directions unless obstructed by a physical object or topography.

The principle of cross-cutting relationships states that whatever cuts across or intrudes into the layers of strata is younger than the layers of strata.

== Methodology ==
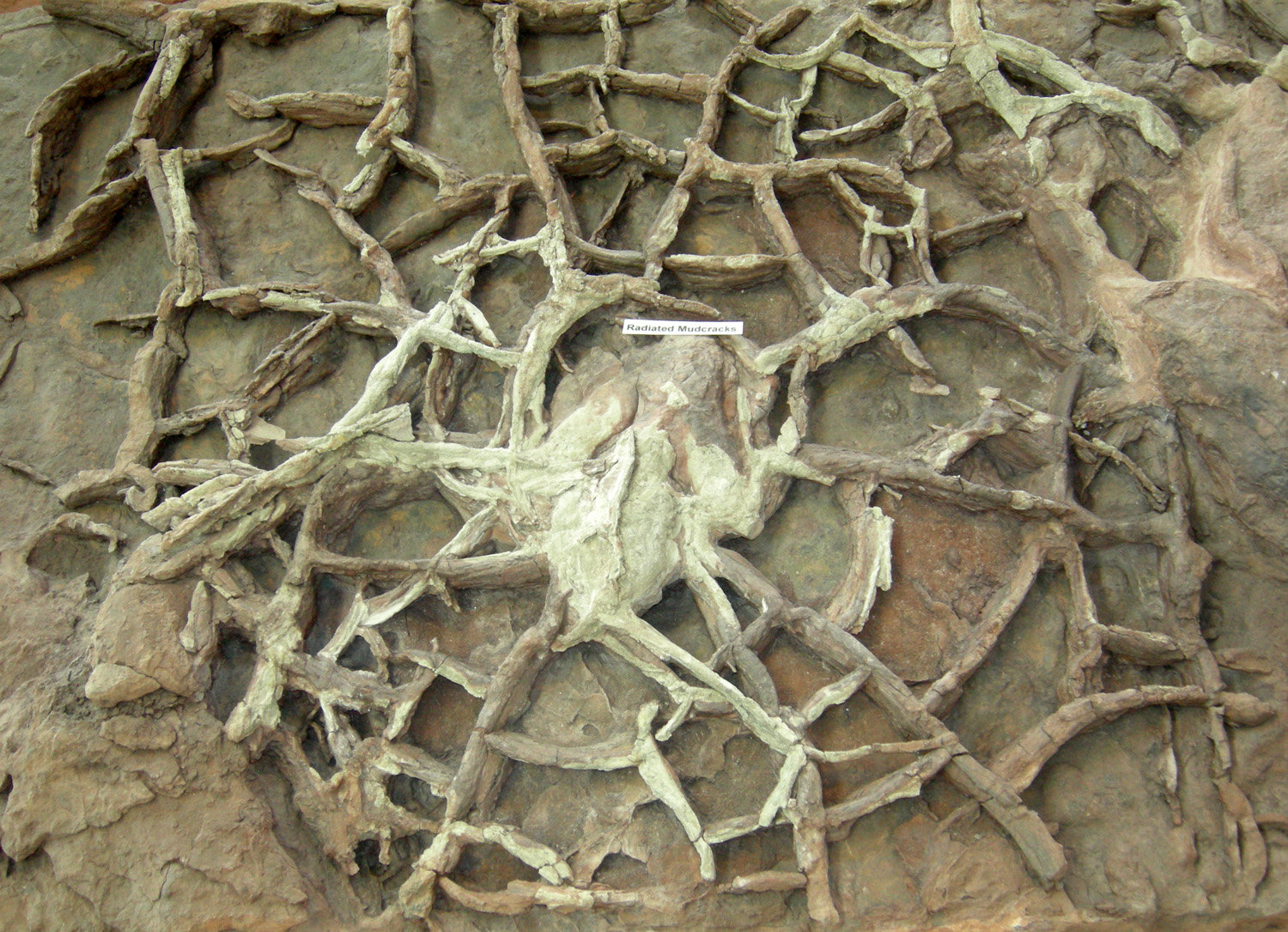
Centripetal desiccation cracks (with a dinosaur footprint in the center) in the Lower Jurassic Moenave Formation at the St. George Dinosaur Discovery Site at Johnson Farm, southwestern Utah.

The methods employed by sedimentologists to gather data and evidence on the nature and depositional conditions of sedimentary rocks include;

- Measuring and describing the outcrop and distribution of the rock unit;
  - Describing the rock formation, a formal process of documenting thickness, lithology, outcrop, distribution, contact relationships to other formations
  - Mapping the distribution of the rock unit, or units
- Descriptions of rock core (drilled and extracted from wells during hydrocarbon exploration)
- Sequence stratigraphy
  - Describes the progression of rock units within a basin
- Describing the lithology of the rock;
  - Petrology and petrography; particularly measurement of texture, grain size, grain shape (sphericity, rounding, etc.), sorting and composition of the sediment
- Analysing the geochemistry of the rock
  - Isotope geochemistry, including use of radiometric dating, to determine the age of the rock, and its affinity to source regions

== Recent developments ==
The longstanding understanding of how some mudstones form has been challenged by geologists at Indiana University (Bloomington) and the Massachusetts Institute of Technology. The research, which appears in the December 14, 2007, edition of Science, counters the prevailing view of geologists that mud only settles when water is slow-moving or still, instead showing that "muds will accumulate even when currents move swiftly." The research shows that some mudstones may have formed in fast-moving waters: "Mudstones can be deposited under more energetic conditions than widely assumed, requiring a reappraisal of many geologic records."

Macquaker and Bohacs, in reviewing the research of Schieber et al., state that "these results call for critical reappraisal of all mudstones previously interpreted as having been continuously deposited under still waters. Such rocks are widely used to infer past climates, ocean conditions, and orbital variations."

Considerable recent research into mudstones has been driven by the recent effort to commercially produce hydrocarbons from them as unconventional reservoirs, in both the shale gas and tight oil (or Light Tight Oil) plays.

Recent research by an Australian sedimentologist, Dutkiewicz, has described how geocirculation is related to global temperatures and climate change. The research described carbon and water circulation, and impacts of heat on current and future capacity of carbon capture by the ocean.

== See also ==
- Clastic rocks – Sedimentary rocks made of mineral or rock fragments
- Coal – Combustible sedimentary rock composed primarily of carbon
- Geology – Scientific study of Earth's physical composition
- Mineralogy of Mars
- Oil shale – Organic-rich fine-grained sedimentary rock containing kerogen
- Ore genesis – How the various types of mineral deposits form within the Earth's crust
- Rock formation
- Sequence stratigraphy – Study and analysis of groups of sedimentary deposits
- Vegetation-induced sedimentary structures
