= Adriana Dutkiewicz =

Australian heatwave expert

- Education: Flinders University
- Occupation: Scientist
- Known for: Sedimentology research
- Scientific career
- Institutions: University of Sydney
- Website: sydney.edu.au/science/people/adriana.dutkiewicz.php

Adriana Dutkiewicz is an Australian sedimentologist at the University of Sydney. She was awarded the Dorothy Hill award in 2006 and is an ARC Future Fellow.

== Career ==
Dutkiewicz's research is focussed on sedimentology, and covers a suite of rocks and sediments ranging in age from Archaean to Quaternary. Her research is multi-disciplinary and focusses on global carbon cycles, combining traditional sedimentology with more recent technologies.

Dutkiewicz has conducted research in early Precambrian petroleum geology. The Dorothy Hill award described her as "the first to discover oil inclusions preserved in Archaean and early Precambrian rocks and to demonstrate that primordial biomass was sufficiently abundant to generate hydrocarbons". Her research showed that eukaryotes were able to survive extreme climatic events, such as much higher temperatures than previously was known. She has contributed discovery and insights into the early evolution of life as well as conducting research into the exploration of petroleum.

== Publications ==
- Dutkiewicz, A. & Müller, R.D., 2022. Deep-sea hiatuses track the vigor of Cenozoic ocean bottom currents. Geology.
- Dutkiewicz, A. & Müller, R.D., 2021. The carbonate compensation depth in the South Atlantic Ocean since the Late Cretaceous. Geology, v. 49, p. 873-878.
- Dutkiewicz, A. Judge, A., Müller, R.D., 2020. Environmental predictors of deep-sea polymetallic nodule occurrence in the global ocean. Geology, v. 48, p. 293-297.
- Dutkiewicz, A., Müller, R.D., Cannon, J., Vaughan, S., Zahirovic, S., 2019. Sequestration and subduction of deep-sea carbonate in the global ocean since the Early Cretaceous. Geology, v. 47, p. 91-94.

== Media ==
Dutkiewicz has been in the media, reporting on how global geocirculation is related to global temperatures and climate change. The research is involved in carbon and water circulation, and impacts of heat and carbon capture by the ocean. “So far, the ocean has absorbed a quarter of anthropogenic CO2 and over 90 percent of the associated excess heat.” Her research has also been published and described in other media including the ABC.

== Awards ==
- 2024 Mawson Medal and Lecture from the Australian Academy of Science
- 2006: Dorothy Hill Award from the Australian Academy of Science
- 2006: CSIRO Medal for Scientific Achievement (group award)
- 2005: JG Russell Award from the Australian Academy of Science
- 1991: Western Mining Prize for Excellence in Geoscience (top First Class Honours).
