= Leanne Armand =

Australian marine scientist (1968–2022)

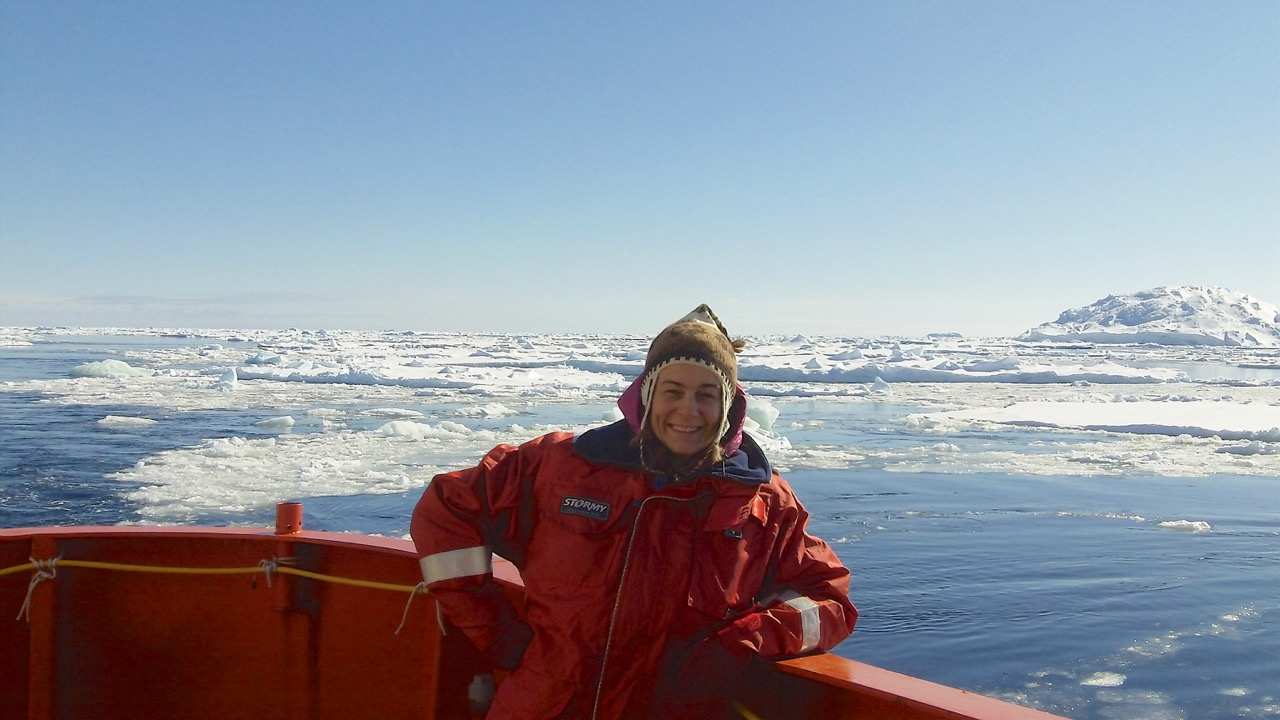
- Armand at George V Coast
- Born: Leanne Dansie; 20 February 1968; Adelaide, South Australia
- Died: 4 January 2022 (aged 53); Canberra, Australia
- Education: PhD. Australian National University & University of Bordeaux, BSc Flinders University
- Scientific career
- Fields: Marine biology Diatom biology
- Website: Leanne Armand laboratory website

Leanne Armand (20 February 1968 – 4 January 2022) was an Australian professor of marine science. She was an expert in the identification of diatoms in the Southern Ocean. She was known for her contributions to the understanding of past Southern Ocean dynamics and sea ice as a result of her knowledge of diatom distributions and ecology.

Her research focused on the distribution of diatoms, a single-cell microscopic phytoplankton, within the Southern Ocean. Different species of diatoms inhabit different regions of the ocean, depending on the physical characteristics (e.g. temperature, salinity and nutrients) of the water mass. Understanding diatom distributions and how their skeletons are preserved in the fossil record contained within sediment cores taken from the ocean floor can provide information about past climate regimes, including ocean temperatures and sea ice extent. Armand also studied diatoms in the Southern Ocean near Kerguelen and Heard Islands to examine their role in the transport of carbon to the ocean floor after their annual spring bloom.

Armand was also a strong advocate for Women in Science and was a mentor and role model to many Australian women in marine and geo-science.

== Early life ==
Armand was born in Adelaide, South Australia on 20 February 1968. She spent a lot of time as a child at the nearby beaches, collecting seashells and using them to set up 'museums' at home along with other bits and pieces.

Armand's interest in biology was nurtured by excellent high school teachers at St Mary's College, Adelaide, where she won the Green Biology prize for best student. In Year 12 she was selected to participate in a Rotary exchange to a high school in Arkansas, U.S.A.

== Education and career ==
Armand studied biology at Flinders University for her undergraduate degree and, after one false start on an Honours project in Alice Springs, finished an Honours degree at the Australian National University studying vertebrate fossils from Teapot Creek in the southern Monaro region of New South Wales, under the guidance of Australia's grandfather of vertebrate fossils, William David Ride.

Specializing in micropalaeontology, the study of tiny fossils, for her PhD studies, Armand examined the fossilised remains of diatoms found in deep sea sediment cores. She used them to interpret past climate conditions by looking at which types were indicative of warmer or cooler temperatures, and how this represented the advance or retreat of sea ice.

Armand's PhD project was a joint collaboration between the Australian National University and the University of Bordeaux in France. She completed her PhD in France with the intention to spend her early career in France or elsewhere overseas. When the offer of a post-doctoral position came up at the Antarctic Climate and Ecosystem Cooperative Research Centre (ACE CRC), Hobart, Tasmania, Armand, with her family, including a three-month-old son returned, to Australia. Armand now has a second son.

Her post-doctoral research examined the role of sea ice dynamics in the Southern Ocean dynamics over the past 190,000 years. Her research has helped inform climate modellers and oceanographers about how sea ice extent helps drive ocean circulation and how this affects fisheries stocks, the broader food web, and also the underlying connections between sea surface temperatures and terrestrial climates.

Armand was the first Australian recipient of the European Union's Marie Curie Incoming Fellowship in 2005, where she spent three years studying at the Institut Méditerranéen d' Océanographie, Université Aix-Marseille in collaboration with Prof. Bernard Quéguiner. Here she broadened her skill set to encompass the identification and distribution of living diatoms, through participation in the Kerguelen Island research mission (KEOPS) to understand natural iron-fertilisation of the oceans and the response stimulated in diatoms. As a result of this Fellowship Armand's expertise cuts across the living, exported to fossil diatoms making her a unique researcher in the diatom community.

Armand was employed in 2009 by Macquarie University, and joined the Climate Futures Centre of Research Excellence, Department of Biological Sciences at Macquarie University where she lectured in marine sciences and first year skills-based courses and headed a team of phytoplankton researchers and students. She was the Deputy Director of the MQ Marine Research Centre at Macquarie University (2015-2016). Armand participated in CSIRO's Scientists in Schools program, sharing her experiences as a female research scientist.

Armand was the first Director of the national Collaborative Australian Postgraduate Sea Training Alliance Network (CAPSTAN) designing a Master-level training at sea program with the Marine National Facility on the RV Investigator (2013-2017).

Armand was the first Chief Scientist to take the new Australian research ship RV Investigator to the Southern Ocean with a team of international researchers to investigate past glacial and interglacial conditions off the coast of Antarctica near the Totten Glacier, Sabrina Coast, East Antarctica, in 2017.

In 2018 Armand joined the Research School of Earth Sciences at the Australian National University. She was the ANZIC (Australian and New Zealand International Ocean Discovery Program Consortium) Program Scientist and then the Program Director.

== Personal life and death ==
She died after a short battle with cancer, on 4 January 2022, at the age of 53.

== Awards ==
Armand received the Bigelow Laboratory's Rose-Provasoli Award She was recipient of the European Union Incoming Marie Curie Fellowship (2005-2007) and the Australian Academy of Science's Dorothy Hill award in 2007 for excellence in palaeoceanographic research. She received a U.S. Antarctic Service Medal in 2014 for the Sabrina Coast Mission on the RVIB Palmer and was the first Chief Scientist to conduct a Southern Ocean expedition on Australia’s then-new research ship, RV Investigator, in 2017.
