= Maria Seton =

Australian geologist

- Education: The University of Sydney
- Awards: Dorothy Hill award (2014)
- Scientific career
- Fields: Geology
- Workplaces: The University of Sydney

Maria Seton (nee Sdrolias) is an Australian geologist in the Faculty of Science EarthByte Group School of Geosciences at the University of Sydney. Seton's research is in the field of geophysics and geodynamics. Her main focus is the link between plate tectonic and mantle processes. Seton also works on kinematic controls on subduction and back-arc basin formation and the relationship between tectonics and palaeo-climate.

== Research ==
=== Subduction and Back-arc-Basin ===
Seton has recently updated the palaeo subduction and back-arc basin parameters. This important data was visualised in a new grid map available online. One of the main achievements of this work is the correlation made between the age of the subducting oceanic lithosphere and the intermediate dip of the slab. Related to the subduction survey, back-arc-basins were studied, and their occurrence was correlated to the age of subducting oceanic lithosphere.

=== SW Pacific and Philippine Sea tectonics ===
Seton had surveyed the SW Pacific Ocean and collected important new bathymetry, gravity and magnetic data on the FAUST2 cruise. She published the results concerning the spreading history in the inactive back-arc basins in The Australian Plate GSA Special Volume. Seton also examined the rotation history of the Philippine Sea plate.

=== Collaborative projects ===
Seton is involved a collaborative work on the creation of the new agegrid as well as palaeo-agegrids. Another collaborative work she is involved with is the modelling the palaeoenvironment and palaeoclimate of the Southern Ocean during the past 40 million years.

== Sandy Island enigma ==
In one of her research cruises through the South Pacific Ocean, Dr Seton and her colleagues realised that an island charted on Google Earth and scientific maps in fact does not exist. A close investigation exposed a mistake that was made by sailors in the 19th century when the region was mapped. Sandy Island, New Caledonia was removed from the official French hydrographic charts by the French Hydrographic Service in 1974 after a flying recognition campaign and by AHS in 1985. The information about the status of the phantom island was passed on to other national hydrographic services around the world, but Sandy Island remained in global coastline and bathymetry compilations used by the anglophone community and was still there when the R/V Southern Surveyor sailed toward the Coral Sea in October 2012.

== Select publications and bibliography ==
- Seton (née Sdrolias), M., Whittaker, J., Wessel, P., Müller, R., DeMets, C., Merkouriev, S., Cande, S., Gaina, C., Eagles, G., Granot, R., et al. (2014). Community infrastructure and repository for marine magnetic identifications. G3: Geochemistry, Geophysics, Geosystems: an electronic journal of the earth sciences, 15, 1629–1641.
- Gallagher, S., Exon, N., Seton (née Sdrolias), M., Ikehara, M., Hollis, C., Arculus, R., D'Hondt, S., Foster, C., Gurnis, M., Kennett, J., et al. (2014). Exploring new drilling prospects in the southwest Pacific. Scientific Drilling, 2(17), 1–6.
- Butterworth, N., Talsma, A., Müller, R., Seton (née Sdrolias), M., Bunge, H., Schuberth, B., Shephard, G., Heine, C. (2014). Geological, tomographic, kinematic and geodynamic constraints on the dynamics of sinking slabs. Journal of Geodynamics, 73, 1–13.
- Zahirovic, S., Seton (née Sdrolias), M., Müller, R. (2014). The Cretaceous and Cenozoic tectonic evolution of Southeast Asia. Solid Earth, 56, 227–273.
- Flament, N., Gurnis, M., Williams, S., Seton (née Sdrolias), M., Skogseid, J., Heine, C., Müller, R. (2014). Topographic asymmetry of the South Atlantic from global models of mantle flow and lithospheric stretching. Earth and Planetary Science Letters, 387, 107–119.
- Coltice, N., Seton (née Sdrolias), M., Rolf, T., Müller, R., Tackley, P. (2013). Convergence in tectonic reconstructions and mantle convection models for significant fluctuations in seafloor spreading. Earth and Planetary Science Letters, 383, 92–100.
- Bower, D., Gurnis, M., Seton (née Sdrolias), M. (2013). Lower Mantle Structure from paleogeographically constrained dynamic Earth models. G3: Geochemistry, Geophysics, Geosystems: an electronic journal of the earth sciences, 14(1), 44–63.
- Seton (née Sdrolias), M., Williams, S., Zahirovic, S., Micklethwaite, S. (2013). Obituary: Sandy Island (1876–2012). EOS, 94(15), 141–142.
- Morra, G., Seton (née Sdrolias), M., Quevedo, L., Müller, R. (2013). Organization of the tectonic plates in the last 200 Myr. Earth and Planetary Science Letters, 373, 93–101.
- Müller, R., Dutkiewicz, A., Seton (née Sdrolias), M., Gaina, C. (2013). Seawater chemistry driven by supercontinent assembly, break-up, and dispersal. Geology (Boulder), 41(8), 907–910.
- Shephard, G., Müller, R., Seton (née Sdrolias), M. (2013). The tectonic evolution of the Arctic since Pangea break-up: Integrating constraints from surface geology and geophysics with mantle structure. Earth-Science Reviews, 124, 148–183.
- Wright, N., Zahirovic, S., Müller, R., Seton (née Sdrolias), M. (2013). Towards community-driven paleogeographic reconstructions: integrating open-access paleogeographic and paleobiology data with plate tectonics. Biogeosciences, 10(3), 1529–1541.
- Matthews, K., Seton (née Sdrolias), M., Müller, R. (2012). A global-scale plate reorganisation event at 105–100 Ma. Earth and Planetary Science Letters, 355–356, 283–298.
- Greenwood, D., Herold, N., Huber, M., Müller, R., Seton (née Sdrolias), M. (2012). Early to middle Miocene monsoon climate in Australia. Geology (Boulder), 40(6), e274-e274.
- Seton (née Sdrolias), M., Müller, R., Zahirovic, S., Gaina, C., Torsvik, T., Shephard, G., Talsma, A., Gurnis, M., Turner, M., Maus, S., et al. (2012). Global continental and ocean basin reconstructions since 200 Ma. Earth-Science Reviews, 113(3–4), 212–270.
- Zahirovic, S., Müller, R., Seton (née Sdrolias), M., Flament, N., Gurnis, M., Whittaker, J. (2012). Insights on the kinematics of the India-Eurasia collision from global geodynamic models. G3: Geochemistry, Geophysics, Geosystems: an electronic journal of the earth sciences, 13(4).
- Herold, N., Huber, M., Müller, R., Seton (née Sdrolias), M. (2012). Modeling the Miocene climatic optimum: Ocean Circulation. Paleoceanography, 27(1), 1–22.
- Gurnis, M., Turner, M., Zahirovic, S., DiCaprio, L., Spasojevic, S., Müller, R., Boyden, J., Seton (née Sdrolias), M., Manea, V., Bower, D. (2012). Plate Tectonic Reconstructions with Continuously Closing Plates. Computers and Geosciences, 38(1), 35–42.
- Chandler, M., Wessel, P., Taylor, B., Seton (née Sdrolias), M., Kim, S., Hyeong, K. (2012). Reconstructing Ontong Java Nui: Implications for Pacific absolute plate motion, hotspot drift and true polar wander. Earth and Planetary Science Letters, 331–332, 140–151.
- Herold, N., Huber, M., Greenwood, D., Müller, R., Seton (née Sdrolias), M. (2011). Early to middle Miocene monsoon climate in Australia. Geology (Boulder), 39(1), 3–6.
- Goes, S., Capitanio, F., Morra, G., Seton (née Sdrolias), M., Giardini, D. (2011). Signatures of downgoing plate-buoyancy driven subduction in Cenozoic plate motions. Physics of the Earth and Planetary Interiors, 184(1–2), 1–13.
- Herold, N., Müller, R., Seton (née Sdrolias), M. (2010). Comparing early to middle Miocene terrestrial climate simulations with geological data. Geosphere, 6(6), 952–961.
- Liu, L., Gurnis, M., Seton (née Sdrolias), M., Saleeby, J., Müller, R., Jackson, J. (2010). The role of oceanic plateau subduction in the Laramide orogeny. Nature Geoscience, 3(5), 353–357.
- Tong, J., You, Y., Müller, R., Seton (née Sdrolias), M. (2009). Climate model sensitivity to atmospheric CO_{2} concentrations for the middle Miocene. Global and Planetary Change, 67(3–4), 129–140.
- Herold, N., You, Y., Müller, R., Seton (née Sdrolias), M. (2009). Climate model sensitivity to changes in Miocene paleotopography. Australian Journal of Earth Sciences, 56(8), 1049–1059.
- Seton (née Sdrolias), M., Gaina, C., Müller, R., Heine, C. (2009). Mid-Cretaceous seafloor spreading pulse: Fact or fiction? Geology (Boulder), 37(8), 687–690.
- Müller, R., Seton (née Sdrolias), M., Gaina, C., Roest, W. (2008). Age, spreading rates, and spreading asymmetry of the world's ocean crust. G3: Geochemistry, Geophysics, Geosystems: an electronic journal of the earth sciences, 9(4), 1–19.
- Müller, R., Seton (née Sdrolias), M., Gaina, C., Steinberger, B., Heine, C. (2008). Long-Term Sea-Level Fluctuations Driven by Ocean Basin Dynamics. Science, 319(5868), 1357–1362.
- Herold, N., Seton (née Sdrolias), M., Müller, R., You, Y., Huber, M. (2008). Middle Miocene tectonic boundary conditions for use in climate models. G3: Geochemistry, Geophysics, Geosystems: an electronic journal of the earth sciences, 9(10), Q10009-1-Q10009-10.
- Whittaker, J., Müller, R., Leitchenkov, G., Stagg, H., Seton (née Sdrolias), M., Gaina, C., Goncharov, A. (2008). Response to comment on "Major Australian-antarctic plate reorganization at Hawaiian-emperor bend time". Science, 321(5888), 490.
- Whittaker, J., Müller, R., Leitchenkov, G., Stagg, H., Seton (née Sdrolias), M., Gaina, C., Goncharov, A. (2007). Major Australian-Antarctic plate reorganisation at Hawaiian-Emperor bend time [Report]. Science, 318(5847), 83–86.
- Whittaker, J., Müller, R., Seton (née Sdrolias), M., Heine, C. (2007). Sunda-Java trench kinematics, slab window formation and over-riding plate deformation since the Cretaceous. Earth and Planetary Science Letters, 255(3–4), 445–457.
- Seton (née Sdrolias), M., Müller, R. (2006). Controls on back-arc basin formation. G3: Geochemistry, Geophysics, Geosystems: an electronic journal of the earth sciences, 7(4), 1–40.
- Seton (née Sdrolias), M., Roest, W., Müller, R. (2004). An Expression Of Philippine Plate Rotation: The Parece *Vela And Shikoku Basins. Tectonophysics, 394, 69–86.
- Seton (née Sdrolias), M., Müller, R., Mauffret, A., Bernardel, G. (2004). Enigmatic Formation Of The Norfolk *Basin, Sw Pacific: A Plume Influence On Back-Arc Extension. G3: Geochemistry, Geophysics, Geosystems: an electronic journal of the earth sciences, 5(6), 1–28. [More Information]
- Hall, C., Gurnis, M., Seton (née Sdrolias), M., Lavier, L., Müller, R. (2003). Castastrophic initiation of subduction following forced convergence across fracture zones. Earth and Planetary Science Letters, 212, 15–30.
- Seton (née Sdrolias), M., Müller, R., Gaina, C. (2003). Tectonic evolution of the southwest Pacific using constraints from backarc basins. Geological Society of Australia Special Publication, 22, 343–359.
