= Madeleine van Oppen =

Dutch ecological geneticist

Madeleine Josephine Henriette van Oppen FAA
- Education: University of Groningen
- Occupation: Ecological geneticist
- Known for: Coral reef genetics

Madeleine van Oppen FAA is an ecological geneticist researching at the Australian Institute of Marine Science and the University of Melbourne. She obtained her MsC in 1990 and completed her PhD cum laude on the molecular biogeography of seaweeds at the University of Groningen in 1995.

Van Oppen began to study corals in 1997 and coral-associated microorganisms in 2000. She is an expert in reef genetics and in questions regarding coral bleaching and reef restoration.

She pioneered the field of coral assisted evolution.

In 2005, she was awarded the Dorothy Hill Medal.

She was awarded an Australian Research Council Laureate Fellow in 2018.

She was elected a Fellow of the Australian Academy of Science in 2024.
