= Queen's Award for Forestry =

The Queen's Award for Forestry was awarded to recognise outstanding contributions to forestry by a Commonwealth citizen nominated by the Commonwealth Forestry Association. The award recognises achievements and supports future work of an outstanding mid-career forester who combines exceptional contributions with an innovative approach to their work.

== Recipients ==
=== Recipients - individuals ===
- John Turnbull (1988)
- SN Rai (1991)
- Yemi Katerere (1993)
- Thang Hooi Chiew (1996)
- Jerome Vanclay (1997)
- VK Bahuguna (2000)
- Stephen Bass (2001)
- Ravi Prabhu (2005)
- Shashi Kant (2008)
- Jolanda Roux (2011)
- Douglas Sheil (2015)
