= National Marine Science Centre, Australia =

Coordinates: 30.2677°S 153.1374°E

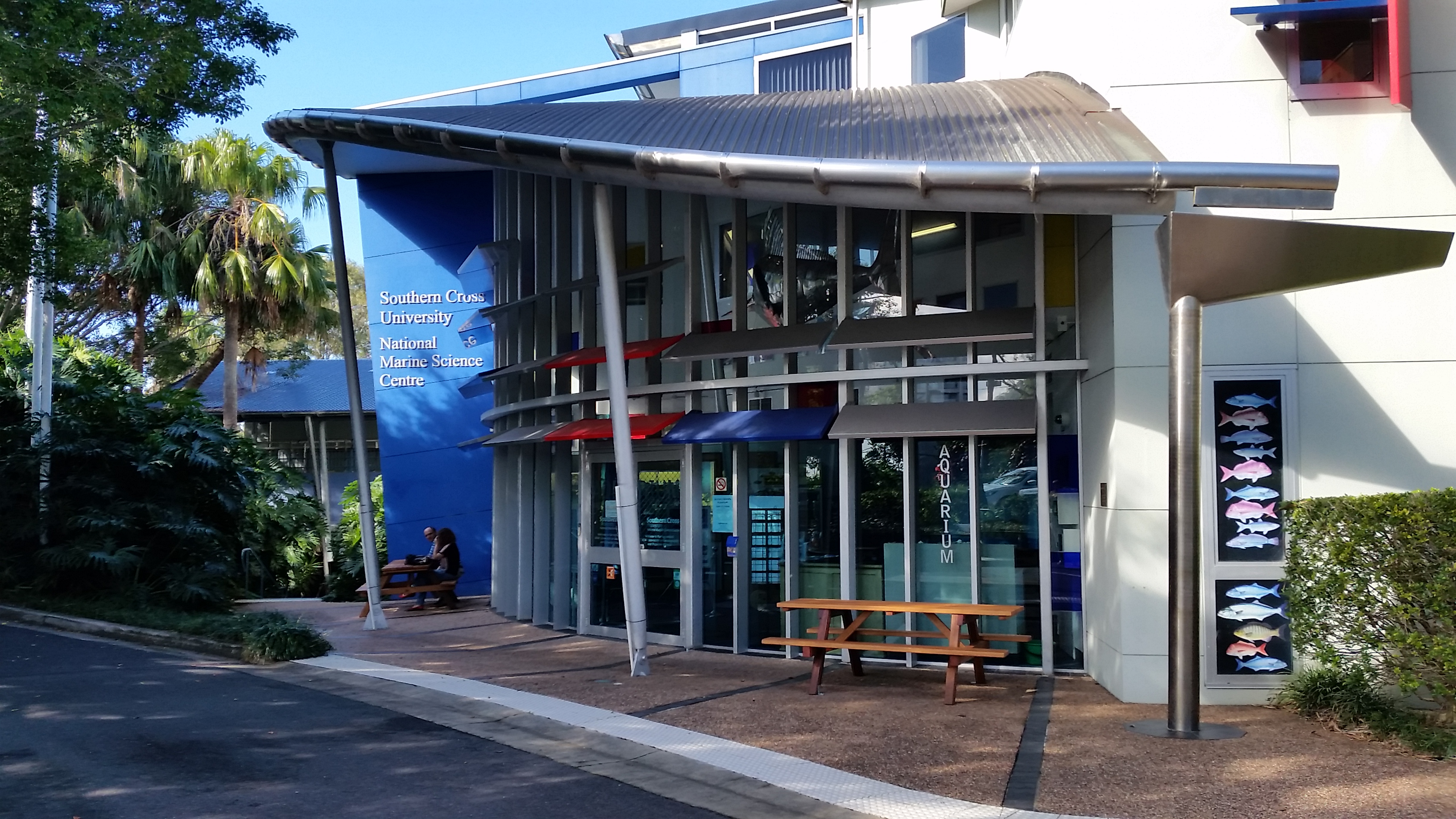
National Marine Science Centre, Coffs Harbour, Australia

The National Marine Science Centre (NMSC) is part of the School of Environment, Science and Engineering, at Southern Cross University. Located in Coffs Harbour, New South Wales, on the east coast of Australia and adjacent to the Solitary Islands Marine Park.

The National Marine Science Centre, situated at the boundary of the Solitary Islands Marine Park in sub-tropical Coffs Harbour, boasts ,globally for researching coastal and marine ecosystems and their diverse inhabitants. Research at the NMSC is enhanced by marine laboratory and field facilities.

With expertise in areas such as marine biodiversity and ecology, aquaculture, estuarine and coastal processes, and coastal management, teaching that are focused on conserving and sustaining marine environments impacted by urbanisation and climate change.

The Centre is sited within the grounds of the Novotel Pacific Bay Resort, a few kilometers north of Coffs Harbour. The building was at one time the resort's sports centre, gymnasium, squash courts, and alfresco restaurant.

== Science ==
Undergraduate and graduate courses are offered by Southern Cross University.

- Bachelor of Marine Science and Management
- Bachelor of Environmental Science/Bachelor of Marine Science and Management
- Bachelor of Science with Honours
- Master of Marine Science and Management

Research is undertaken by resident scientific staff. Principal areas are:-

- Biodiversity of marine and estuarine habitats
- Patterns and biological processes in marine communities
- Human induced impacts on marine systems
- Fisheries and marine park management
- Marine resource economics and management
- Values in the marine economy
- Capacity development of marine scientists and managers

== History ==
The University of New England (UNE) built a small marine field station on Arrawarra Headland in the early 1960s. The then Professor of Zoology at UNE, Tony O’Farrell, was the chief instigator in the creation of the station and at that time it was the only permanent location for the teaching and research in marine biology and ecology between Sydney and Brisbane.

As marine biology research developed in Australia and in universities, in the 1990s the Head of School for Biological Sciences at UNE, Professor Rodney D. Simpson, led a proposal for an extended marine science centre to augment marine research. This was especially relevant with the development of the Solitary Islands marine park immediately offshore. Professor Simpson became the inaugural Director of the NMSC.

The Centre was opened on 15 November 2001 by John Anderson MP, Deputy Prime Minister of Australia and had its first intake of students in 2002. The centre was funded from the Government of Australia's Centenary of Federation Fund.

In 2010, by mutual agreement and with a financial payment to UNE, Southern Cross University took over sole operation of the centre.

A history of the first 10 years of research at the NMSC, is outlined in a 2024 article in the Journal and Proceedings of the Royal Society of NSW.

From 2016 to 2019, Professor Stephen Smith was Director of the NMSC.

== See also ==
- Earth science (Hydrosphere)
- Oceanography
- List of universities in Australia
