= Kate Trinajstic =

Australian palaeontologist and biologist

- Education: University of Western Australia Murdoch University
- Occupation: Vertebrate palaeontologist
- Title: Professor
- Scientific career
- Workplaces: Curtin University

Kate Trinajstic or Katherine M. Trinajstic is an Australian palaeontologist, evolutionary biologist, and winner of the Dorothy Hill Award. She is the Dean of Research, Faculty of Science and Engineering at Curtin University.

== Early life and career ==
Trinajstic was awarded a Bachelor of Science, (Hons), in ecology and evolutionary biology, from Murdoch University in 1996. She then was awarded a PhD in palaeontology from the University of Western Australia, in 2000. She joined Curtin University in 2009 as a Curtin Research Fellow. In 2011 she was awarded an ARC QEII Fellowship, titled 'Fleshing out the fossil record', which was designed to investigate the development of early vertebrates, and the skeleton and specific musculature. She was both a Curtin Research Fellow, as well as an honorary Research Associate at the University of Western Australia.

Her career has specialised in vertebrate palaeontology, and also how early vertebrate were able to evolve unique morphology, including complex musculature and internal skeletons. She has experience in the use of micro-CT scans as well as scanning fossils using a syncotron, to examine fossil materials. Her work has included how the earth has responded to climate change.

Trinajstic has also conducted research on fossils and palaeongoloy using techniques such as micro-CT and the synchrotron, which enables her to see through rock and determine how fossils of animals such as fish, were able to develop teeth. During her career, she has also named seven taxa.

== Women in Science ==
Trinajstic commented in 2020 on a campaign for attracting science and engineering academics, where only women were welcome to apply. The campaign was designed to address the gender balance in the workforce, and while Research Dean for the faculty, she commented that the program was "a good starting point to attracting talented academic females into the Faculty" and "The benefits of increasing gender representation can start to be realised ensuring we continue to grow a diverse and inclusive environment for all"

She worked on a new metric to assess academics, with the aim of overcoming bias in gender and valid across various career stages.

== Publications ==
Trinajstic's Google scholar page lists her publications, which have over 2,000 citations. Trinajstic's publication record is noteworthy for having a significant number of peer-reviewed publications in the presigious, international scientific journals, Nature and Science.

- Trinajstic, Kate; Sanchez, Sophie; Dupret, Vincent; Tafforeau, Paul; Long, John; Young, Gavin; Senden, Tim; Boisvert, Catherine; Power, Nicola; Ahlberg, Per Erik (2013-07-12). "Fossil musculature of the most primitive jawed vertebrates". Science. 341 (6142): 160–164. Bibcode:2013Sci...341..160T. doi:10.1126/science.1237275. ISSN 1095-9203. PMID 23765280. S2CID 39468073.
- Ruecklin, Martin; Donoghue, Philip C. J.; Johanson, Zerina; Trinajstic, Kate; Marone, Federica; Stampanoni, Marco (2012-11-29). "Development of teeth and jaws in the earliest jawed vertebrates". Nature. 491 (7426): 748–751. Bibcode:2012Natur.491..748R. doi:10.1038/nature11555. ISSN 0028-0836. PMID 23075852. S2CID 4302415.
- Ahlberg, Per; Trinajstic, Kate; Johanson, Zerina; Long, John (2009-08-13). "Pelvic claspers confirm chondrichthyan-like internal fertilization in arthrodires". Nature. 460 (7257): 888–889. Bibcode:2009Natur.460..888A. doi:10.1038/nature08176. ISSN 1476-4687. PMID 19597477. S2CID 205217467.
- Long, John A.; Trinajstic, Kate; Johanson, Zerina (2009). "Devonian arthrodire embryos and the origin of internal fertilization in vertebrates". Nature. 457 (7233): 1124–1127. Bibcode:2009Natur.457.1124L. doi:10.1038/nature07732. ISSN 1476-4687. PMID 19242474. S2CID 205215898.
- Long, John A.; Trinajstic, Kate; Young, Gavin C.; Senden, Tim (2008-05-29). "Live birth in the Devonian period". Nature. 453 (7195): 650–652. Bibcode:2008Natur.453..650L. doi:10.1038/nature06966. ISSN 1476-4687. PMID 18509443. S2CID 205213348.

== Media ==
Trinajstic has written various articles for the media, including The Conversation, describing links between sharks and human disease. She has also published in The Conversation on research on vertebral sexual organs, and how they may have evolved as an extra pair of legs. She has also published in the media, describing her research on the fossils of ancient fish, and land movements of extinct fishes, based on new modelling.

She has also published in the ABC, on asteroids and excavated fish fossils, from a site in North Dakota, and how an asteroid was potentially linked with a mass fish death, and published in the media on her research around ancient fish.

== Prizes and awards ==
2003	Dorothy Hill Medal from Australian Academy of Science.
2007	Whitley Award (highly commended) technical writing.
2009	Top Ten Species Award.
2010	Malcolm McIntosh Award for Physical Science
2011	Finalist Eureka Prize - Innovation
