= Sarah Perkins-Kirkpatrick =

Australian heatwave expert

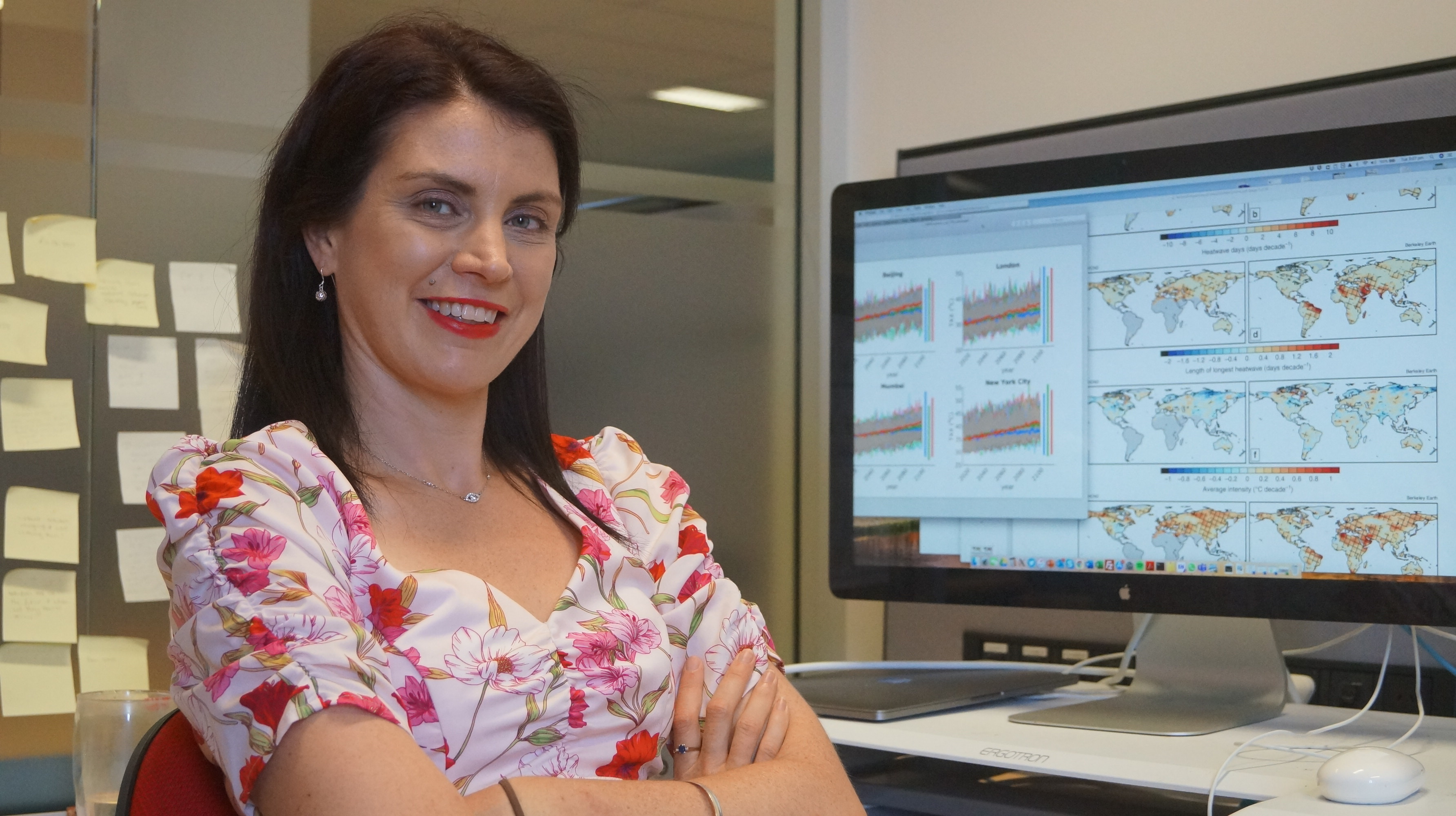
- Perkins-Kirkpatrick in December 2020
- Born: 1983; Sydney, Australia
- Occupation: Scientist
- Known for: Heatwave research

Sarah Perkins-Kirkpatrick is an Australian climate scientist and expert in heatwave research. She was awarded a NSW Young Tall Poppy in 2013 and received the Dorothy Hill award in 2021. She has extensive science communication experience. She was a co-author on the Climate Attribution peer-reviewed paper in the Nature journal, Climate Action, which showed links between emissions from the Woodside Scarborough project, the resultant heat waves, and subsequent deaths of 484 people. The 'extra-ordinary findings' from climate attribution study are reported to be likely to set precedents for and feed into climate litigation cases in future. The findings refute the claim that "climate change can not be attributed to any one event, country, industry or activity."

== Career ==
Perkins-Kirkpatrick is a climate scientist working on heatwave events, including how heatwaves are defined, trends of heatwaves, projected future changes, physical drivers of heatwaves, and anthropogenic influences driving observed events. She was awarded an ARC DECRA, and then subsequently, awarded an ARC Future Fellowship at the Climate Change Research Centre at UNSW. She was at the UNSW Climate Change Research Centre from the years 2012 to 2022, and then moved to UNSW Canberra during 2022-2024. She was awarded the Young Tall Poppy prize for communication in science skills in 2013. Sarah is now a Professor at the Fenner School of Environment and Society at the Australian National University (ANU). She has spent much of her career providing commentary on climate change and heatwaves.

"The less we warm the planet, the less bad heatwave changes will be. They're not looking good."

Perkins-Kirkpatrick has completed two postdoctoral fellowships, one at the CSIRO division of Marine and Atmospheric Research, and a second at the ARC Centre of Excellence for Climate System Science. She has held and undertaken workshops Internationally, in both Australia and in the Pacific Islands, where she was communicating the science of climate change amongst community groups which had little experience or literacy in climate science. Perkins-Kirkpatrick also held a role on the World Meteorological Organisation's Expert Team – in the sector on Climate Risk and Sector specific Climate Indices. In 2011, she also took part in the event where scientists communicate with politicians, called Science meets Parliament.

Perkins-Kirkpatrick specialises in researching and science communication of climate change, climate projections, extreme events, as well as, heatwaves, and extreme heat events. She has recently worked in marine heatwaves, such as the marine heatwave along the coast of South-East Australia in 2022.

Perkins-Kirkpatrick is also a member of the core group of the Resilient Futures Collective, part of UNSW. The Resilient Futures Collective focusses on research on droughts, floods, bushfires, and cyclones, which cause damage and disruption to rural and regional communities. The Collective examines how risk reduction through good governance, planning, and vulnerability analyses can minimise the impacts of natural disasters.

== Awards ==
- 2021 – Dorothy Hill Medal from the Australian Academy of Science.
- 2017 – ARC Future Fellowship, from the Australian Research Council.
- 2016 – Australian Meteorological and Oceanographic Society Early Career Researcher Award.
- 2014 – ARC Centre of Excellence for Climate System Science Director's Prize.
- 2014 – Named one of UNSW's "Rising Stars who will Change the World".
- 2013 – NSW Young Tall Poppy.

== Media ==
Perkins-Kirkpatrick has written for and been quoted in the International and Australian media many times, describing the impacts and science behind climate change and heatwaves, and more recently, marine heatwaves. Her research has been described, and she has participated in media interviews, in Cosmos, Carbon Brief, as well as provided commentary on the BBC, Triple J's Hack, Radio National, the Sydney Morning Herald, the 7:30 Report, Science. She has participated in radio interviews, print media, and written regular blog posts on heatwaves and the impacts of climate change.
