= Southern Cross University =

Australian public university

Coordinates: 28.81730°S 153.29902°E

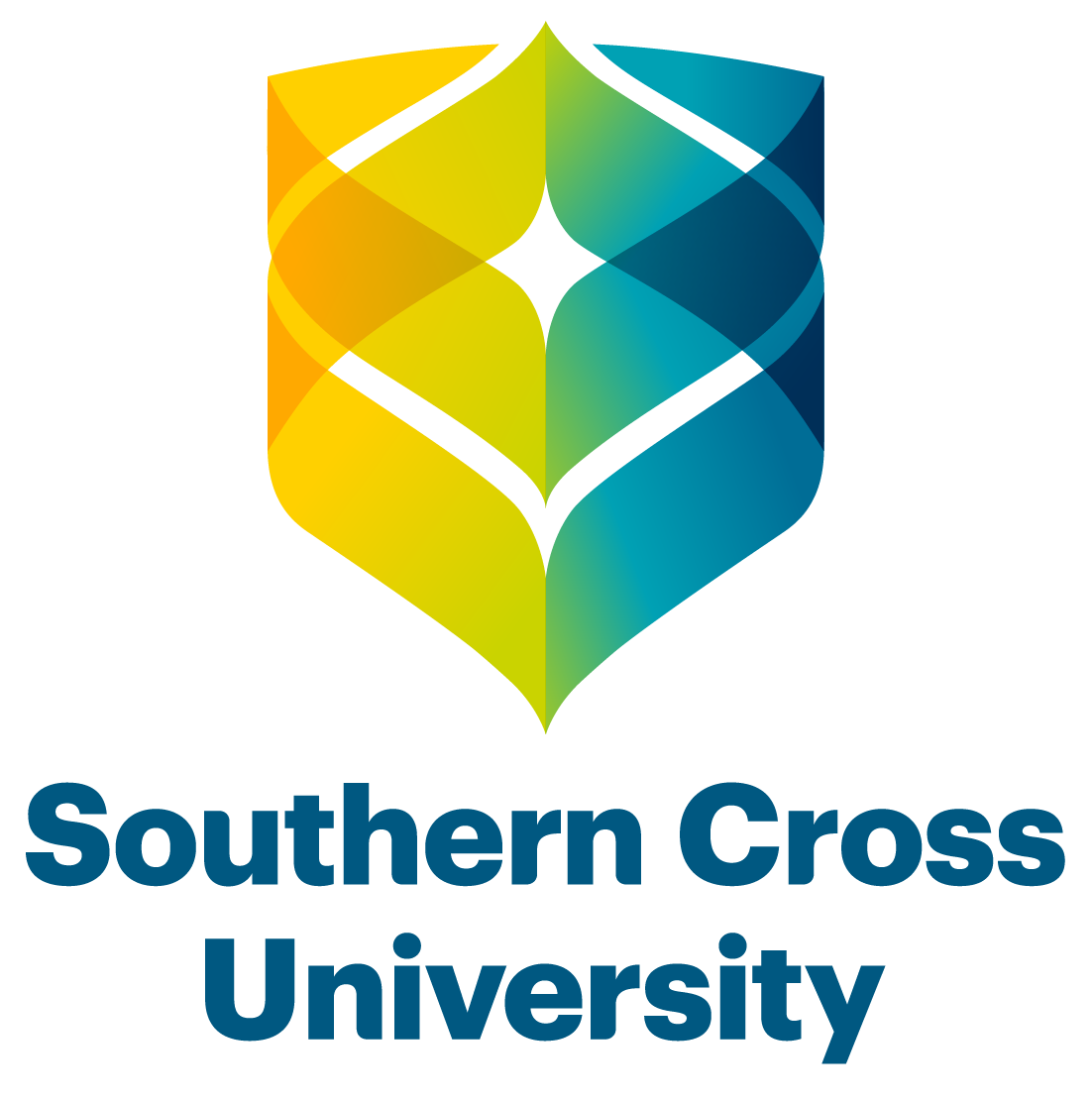
- Former names: List: Lismore Teachers College (1970–1973); Northern Rivers College of Advanced Education (1973–1994)
- Motto: Transforming tomorrow
- Type: Public research university
- Established: 1970 (tertiary college); 1994 (university status)
- Accreditation: TEQSA
- Academic affiliations: RUN; OUA; UA
- Budget: A$321.84 million
- Visitor: Governor of New South Wales (ex officio)
- Chancellor: Sandra McPhee
- Vice-Chancellor: Tyrone Carlin
- Academic staff: 332 FTE (FTE, 2022)
- Administrative staff: 741 FTE (FTE, 2022)
- Total staff: 1,073 FTE (FTE, 2022)
- Students: 21,639 (2023)
- Undergraduates: 11,157
- Postgraduates: 8,939
- Other students: 1,845
- Location: Coffs Harbour, Lismore and Gold Coast, New South Wales and Queensland, Australia
- Campus: Urban, parkland and regional with multiple sites
- Colours: Blue Gold
- Sporting affiliations: UniSport; EAEN
- Website: www.scu.edu.au

Southern Cross University (SCU) is an Australian public university, with campuses at Lismore and Coffs Harbour in northern New South Wales, Coolangatta and satellite campuses in Brisbane, Sydney, Melbourne and Perth. In 2024, SCU was ranking in the top 100 Universities in the world under 50 years old, in 2026 it was ranking in the top 500 universities globally in the Times Higher Education global University rankings and according to the 2026 QS World University rankings was Awarded the most improved - Oceania

As of 2024 SCU has had over 80 000 graduates since its inception in 1994.

== History ==
The initial predecessor institution to Southern Cross University was the Lismore Teachers' College, which commenced operation on 23 February 1970, at what is now the Northern Rivers Conservatorium site. On 1 September 1971, the Lismore Teachers College became a College of Advanced Education, under the Higher Education Act 1969, with the institution soon renamed Northern Rivers College of Advanced Education (NRCAE) in 1973. Dr (later Professor) Rod Treyvaud was appointed principal in 1984, and oversaw an extensive building programme and the introduction of six new degree courses.

Following the publication of the Commonwealth Government's White Paper on Higher Education in 1988 and its emphasis on the development of larger tertiary education institutions in Australia, NRCAE agreed to an association with the University of New England (UNE). On 17 July 1989 NRCAE thus became part of network University of New England, with some 1800 staff and some 9500 EFTSU (effective full-time student units).

There was however dissatisfaction with the new network university, and on 29 June 1993 the federal and state ministers for education jointly announced that a new university would be established in the North Coast of NSW, which would consist of campuses at Lismore (formerly UNE - Northern Rivers) and Coffs Harbour (formerly UNE - Coffs Harbour Centre). It was subsequently announced that the new institution would be called Southern Cross University. Appropriate legislation was passed by both houses of the New South Wales Parliament in October 1993, and received the Royal Assent on 9 November 1993. Southern Cross University was formally established on 1 January 1994.

In 2010, Southern Cross University opened a new campus in the southern Gold Coast area of Queensland, at Coolangatta just 400 metres from North Kirra Beach and adjacent to the Gold Coast International Airport. Views of the Pacific Ocean can be seen from many vantage points in the campus' buildings. The Foundation Building was opened in 2010 and a second 10-story building opened in February 2013.

In 2019 a new health sciences building was opened at the Coffs Harbour campus funded from the Australian Government's Community Development Grants program. Degrees in nursing, midwifery, occupational therapy and sport exercise science are offered in the new space.

== Campuses and buildings ==
=== Lismore ===
Lismore is a regional city located in the Northern Rivers region of NSW. The Lismore campus is set on more than 75 hectares, and houses specialist training teaching facilities including a science and engineering precinct, environmental laboratories, contemporary music and visual arts studios and the SCU Health Clinic. The Learning Centre, at the centre of the campus, features individual and collaborative learning spaces. As of 2021, 1,805 students study on campus at Lismore.

=== Gold Coast ===
The Gold Coast campus is the only Australian university campus located at an airport not requiring local government planning permission. The campus is at Coolangatta, in Queensland, close to North Kirra Beach and adjacent to the Gold Coast Airport. The campus includes general teaching facilities, as well as specialist teaching facilities for nursing and midwifery, and allied health disciplines such as occupational therapy, podiatry, pedorthics and speech pathology. Tourism, business, information technology, law, education, arts and social welfare are also taught at the Gold Coast. As of 2021, 5,592 students study at the Gold Coast campus.

=== Coffs Harbour ===
The Coffs Harbour campus is located on the Mid North Coast of New South Wales, and consists of general teaching facilities, and specialist nursing laboratories, teaching spaces for education students, a biosciences laboratory, and psychology research facilities. The campus is shared with a senior high school and a technical college and hosts 1,259 on-campus students as of 2021.

=== National Marine Science Centre ===
Southern Cross University operates the National Marine Science Centre (NMSC) in Coffs Harbour on the northern side of the city. The NMSC is an international leader in a range of marine research fields, conducting research projects around the world. Research at the National Marine Science Centre (NMSC) addresses critical challenges to the future of the marine environment across four broad areas: Biodiversity, Ecological Interactions, Aquaculture and Sustainable Fisheries. Facilities at the NMSC include a flow-through seawater system that supplies labs, tank farm, aquarium room and hatchery. The Centre also operates the Solitary Islands Aquarium which is open to the public.

=== Sydney and Melbourne ===
Southern Cross University operates The Hotel School Sydney and The Hotel School Melbourne in partnership with Mulpha Australia. Both The Hotel School Sydney and The Hotel School Melbourne are located in the central business districts of their respective cities and have executive offices and teaching facilities. Southern Cross University also operates branch campuses in Sydney and Melbourne, delivering business and accounting degrees to undergraduate and postgraduate international students.

== Governance and structure ==
=== University Council ===
The University is governed by a Council, to which the Chief Executive Officer (the Vice-Chancellor) reports. The Council is responsible for the management of the University's affairs. The major academic body providing advice to Council on academic matter is the Academic Board. The Council has 15 members, including the Chancellor, the Vice Chancellor, the Chair of the Academic Board, two members appointed by the Minister, six members appointed by Council, three elected staff members and one elected student member.

==== Chancellor and Vice-Chancellor ====
The current and fifth Chancellor of the University since July 2021 is Sandra McPhee AM. Ms McPhee is the NSW Public Service Commission Advisory Board chair and has broad experience as a director of companies and other organisations including Tourism Australia, AGL Energy, Westfield, Perpetual, the Coles Group, Fairfax Media, Australia Post, South Australia Water and Kathmandu. The current Vice-Chancellor and President of the University since September 2020 is Professor Tyrone Carlin.

=== Faculties and departments ===
The University offers a range of undergraduate and postgraduate academic programs and is organised into four academic Faculties and two colleges.

- Faculty of Business, Law and Arts
- Faculty of Education
- Faculty of Health
- Faculty of Science and Engineering
- Gnibi College of Indigenous Australian Peoples
- SCU College

== Academic profile ==
Staff and students at Southern Cross University undertake research in a wide range of areas, including civil engineering, crop and pasture production, complementary and alternative medicine, ecology, education, environmental science and management, fisheries sciences, forestry sciences, geochemistry, human movement and sports science, human rights research, information technology, nursing, oceanography, policy and administration, philosophy and ethics, resources engineering and extractive metallurgy, tourism, and zoology.

A priority for SCU is community engagement. For example, SCU has played a leading role in the development of a regional strategy to improve freight and supply chain services across the Northern Rivers, under the title From Roots to Routes A ground up approach to freight and supply chain planning for the Northern Rivers NSW.

=== Research divisions ===
The research centres provide research and solutions that allow students to gain knowledge and learn alongside people in a wide range of research fields.

- Centre for Children and Young People
- Centre for Coastal Biogeochemistry
- Centre for Organics Research
- Centre for Peace and Social Justice
- Forest Research Centre
- National Centre for Flood Research
- Marine Ecology Research Centre
- National Marine Science Centre
- Southern Cross GeoScience
- National Centre for Naturopathic Medicine

=== Academic reputation ===
University rankings

Global – Overall
- QS World: =638 (2026)
- THE World: 401–500 (2026)
- USNWR Global: =1151 (25/26)

National – Overall
- ERA National: 31 (2018)
- QS National: 31 (2026)
- THE National: 26–32 (2026)
- USNWR National: 36 (25/26)
- AFR National: =36 (2025)

National publications

In the Australian Financial Review Best Universities Ranking 2025, the university was tied #36 amongst Australian universities.

Global publications

In the 2026 Quacquarelli Symonds World University Rankings (published 2025), the university attained a tied position of #638 (31st nationally).

In the Times Higher Education World University Rankings 2026 (published 2025), the university attained a position of #401–500 (tied 26–32nd nationally).

In the 2025–2026 U.S. News & World Report Best Global Universities, the university attained a tied position of #1151 (36th nationally).

=== Student outcomes ===
The Australian Government's QILT (Note: Abbreviation for Quality Indicators for Learning and Teaching.) conducts national surveys documenting the student life cycle from enrolment through to employment. These surveys place more emphasis on criteria such as student experience, graduate outcomes and employer satisfaction than perceived reputation, research output and citation counts.

In the 2023 Employer Satisfaction Survey, graduates of the university had an overall employer satisfaction rate of 88.8%.

In the 2023 Graduate Outcomes Survey, graduates of the university had a full-time employment rate of 82.8% for undergraduates and 92.6% for postgraduates. The initial full-time salary was A$72,500 for undergraduates and A$110,000 for postgraduates.

In the 2023 Student Experience Survey, undergraduates at the university rated the quality of their entire educational experience at 69.2% meanwhile postgraduates rated their overall education experience at 76.9%.

== See also ==
- List of universities in Australia
- Kenvale College of Tourism & Hospitality Management, an institution with an articulation agreement with the Hotel School in partnership with Southern Cross University
