= List of open-access journals =

This is a list of open-access journals by field. The list contains notable journals which have a policy of full open access. It does not include delayed open access journals, hybrid open access journals, or related collections or indexing services.

True open-access journals can be split into two categories:

- diamond or platinum open-access journals, which charge no additional publication, open access or article processing fees
- gold open-access journals, which charge publication fees (also called article processing charges, APCs).

== Agriculture ==
- African Journal of Food, Agriculture, Nutrition and Development
- Bulletin of Insectology
- Open Access Journal of Medicinal and Aromatic Plants
- Open Agriculture
- Journal of Horticultural Sciences
- Pertanika Journal of Tropical Agricultural Science

== Astronomy ==
- Journal of the Korean Astronomical Society
- Open Astronomy

== Bioethics ==
- AMA Journal of Ethics
- Canadian Journal of Bioethics
- Indian Journal of Medical Ethics

== Biology ==
- African Invertebrates
- Biology of Sex Differences
- Biology Open
- BMC Biology
- BMC Evolutionary Biology
- BMC Genomics
- BMC Systems Biology
- Cell Reports
- Check List
- Contributions to Zoology
- Ecology and Evolution
- eLife
- F1000Research
- Genome Biology
- Genome Research
- International Journal of Biological Sciences
- Israel Journal of Entomology
- Journal of Biological Chemistry
- Molecular Systems Biology
- Myrmecological News
- Nature Communications
- Oncotarget
- Open Biology
- Open Life Sciences
- PLOS Biology
- PLOS Computational Biology
- PLOS Genetics
- Science Advances
- Scientific Reports
- Stem Cell Reports
- ZooKeys

== Botany ==
- Acta Botanica Brasilica
- Botanical Studies
- Phytologia
- Plant Ecology and Evolution

== Chemistry ==
- ACS Central Science
- Arkivoc
- Beilstein Journal of Organic Chemistry
- Chemical Science
- Molecules
- Open Chemistry
- Organic Syntheses
- RSC Advances

== Computer science ==
- Advances in Distributed Computing and Artificial Intelligence Journal
- Computational Linguistics
- IEEE Access
- Journal of Artificial Intelligence Research
- Journal of Computational Geometry
- Journal of Computer Graphics Techniques
- Journal of Formalized Reasoning
- Journal of Machine Learning Research
- Journal of Object Technology
- Journal of Open Source Software
- Journal of Statistical Software
- Logical Methods in Computer Science
- Semantic Web
- Theory of Computing
- Transactions on Graph Data and Knowledge

== Earth Sciences ==
- Austrian Journal of Earth Sciences
- Brazilian Journal of Geology
- Geologica Belgica
- GSA Today

== Ecology ==
- Ecography

== Economics and finance ==
- The Journal of Entrepreneurial Finance
- Real-World Economics Review
- Swiss Journal of Economics and Statistics
- Theoretical Economics

== Education ==
- Australasian Journal of Educational Technology
- Comunicar
- Education Policy Analysis Archives
- Educational Technology & Society
- Journal of Higher Education Outreach and Engagement
- Journal of International Students

== Energy ==
- Energies
- GCB Bioenergy

== Engineering ==
- Advances in Production Engineering & Management
- Frontiers in Heat and Mass Transfer
- Open Engineering

== Game studies ==
- Analog Game Studies

== Geography and environmental studies ==
- Conservation and Society
- Ecology and Society
- Environmental Health Perspectives
- Environmental Research Letters
- Fennia
- Frontiers in Environmental Science
- Journal of Political Ecology
- Journal of Spatial Information Science
- Open Geosciences
- Nature Environment and Pollution Technology
- npj Science of Food
- PLOS Climate
- PLOS Sustainability and Transformation
- PLOS Water

== Humanities and other journals ==
- Anamesa
- Ancient Iranian Studies
- Continent
- Culture Machine
- Digital Humanities Quarterly
- First Monday
- GHLL
- Medieval Worlds
- Programming Historian
- Reti Medievali Rivista
- Sign Systems Studies
- Southern Spaces
- Transmotion

== Language and linguistics ==
- Glossa
- Language Documentation & Conservation
- Onomastica Canadiana
- Per Linguam

== Law ==
- Duke Law Journal
- German Law Journal
- Health and Human Rights
- Melbourne University Law Review

== Library and information science ==
- College & Research Libraries
- Evidence Based Library and Information Practice
- In the Library with the Lead Pipe
- Information Technologies and International Development
- Scientific Data
- Webology

== Materials science ==
- Polymers
- Science and Technology of Advanced Materials

== Mathematics ==
- Acta Mathematica
- Advances in Group Theory and Applications
- Algebraic Geometry
- Annales Academiae Scientiarum Fennicae. Mathematica
- Annales de l'Institut Fourier
- Arkiv för Matematik
- Ars Mathematica Contemporanea
- Australasian Journal of Combinatorics
- Discrete Analysis
- Discrete Mathematics & Theoretical Computer Science
- Documenta Mathematica
- Electronic Communications in Probability
- Electronic Journal of Combinatorics
- Electronic Journal of Probability
- Electronic Transactions on Numerical Analysis
- Forum of Mathematics
- Hardy-Ramanujan Journal
- Journal de Théorie des Nombres de Bordeaux
- Journal of Formalized Reasoning
- Journal of Graph Algorithms and Applications
- Journal of Integer Sequences
- Mathematics and Mechanics of Complex Systems
- Münster Journal of Mathematics
- The New York Journal of Mathematics
- Open Mathematics
- Rendiconti di Matematica e delle sue Applicazioni
- Séminaire Lotharingien de Combinatoire

== Medicine, pharmaceutical and health sciences ==
(omitting journals already previously mentioned)

- Annals of Saudi Medicine
- Bangladesh Journal of Pharmacology
- Biomedical Imaging and Intervention Journal
- BMC Health Services Research
- BMC Medicine
- BMJ Open
- Bosnian Journal of Basic Medical Sciences
- British Columbia Medical Journal
- British Medical Journal
- Canadian Medical Association Journal
- Clinical and Translational Science
- Cell Reports Medicine
- Cureus
- Dermatology Online Journal
- Deutsches Ärzteblatt International
- Emerging Infectious Diseases
- International Journal of Medical Sciences
- JAMA Network Open
- Journal of the American Heart Association
- Journal of Clinical Investigation
- Journal of Diabetes
- Journal of Postgraduate Medicine
- Medicina Internacia Revuo
- The New England Journal of Medicine
- Open Heart
- Open Medicine
- PLOS Global Public Health
- PLOS Medicine
- PLOS Neglected Tropical Diseases
- PLOS Pathogens
- Scientia Pharmaceutica
- Swiss Medical Weekly

== Music ==
- Music Theory Online

== Nutrition ==
- Journal of Nutrition
- npj Science of Food

== Philosophy ==
- Philosophers' Imprint
- Existenz

== Physics ==
- AIP Advances
- New Journal of Physics
- Open Physics
- Optica
- Optical Materials Express
- Optics Continuum
- Optics Express
- Physical Review X
- Physical Review Research

== Megajournals/Interdisciplinary journals ==
- GigaScience
- iScience
- Journal of the American Society of Questioned Document Examiners
- Nature Communications
- Pertanika Journal of Science & Technology
- PLOS ONE
- PNAS Nexus
- Royal Society Open Science
- Science Advances
- Scientific Reports

== Political science ==
- Caucasian Review of International Affairs
- Central European Journal of International and Security Studies
- Frontiers in Political Science
- Journal of Politics & Society
- Research & Politics

== Robotics ==
- Paladyn

== Social science ==
- Cultural Anthropology
- Demography
- European Journal of Psychology Open
- Frontiers in Political Science
- Frontiers in Psychology
- Jadaliyya
- Journal of Artificial Societies and Social Simulation
- Journal of Political Ecology
- Journal of World-Systems Research
- Pertanika Journal of Social Sciences & Humanities
- Swiss Journal of Sociology

== Statistics ==
- Bayesian Analysis
- Brazilian Journal of Probability and Statistics
- Chilean Journal of Statistics
- Electronic Journal of Statistics
- Journal of Official Statistics
- Journal of Modern Applied Statistical Methods
- Journal of Statistical Software
- Journal of Statistics Education
- Revista Colombiana de Estadistica
- REVSTAT
- SORT
- Statistics Surveys
- Survey Methodology/Techniques d'enquête
- The R Journal

== See also ==
- Directory of Open Access Journals
- List of academic databases and search engines
- Lists of academic journals
- Open access around the world
