= Zbyszek Darzynkiewicz =

Polish-American cell biologist (1936–2021)

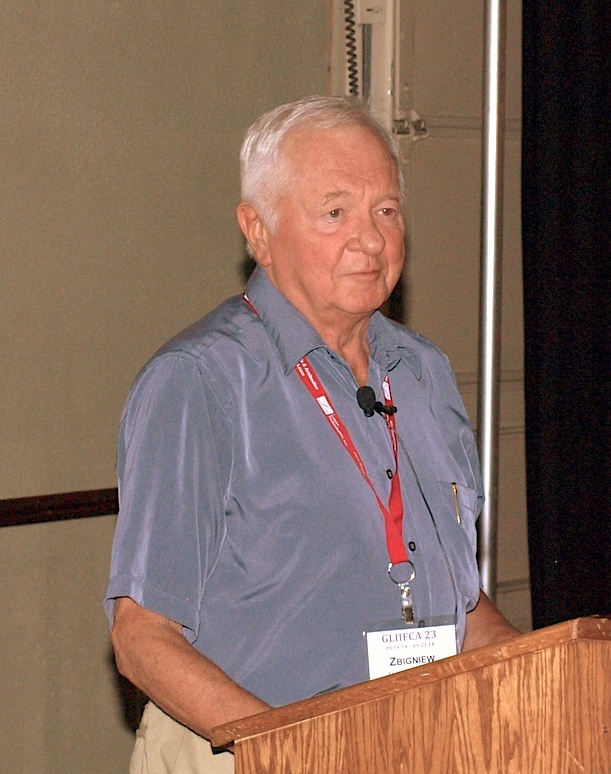
- Born: Zbigniew Dierżykraj Darżynkiewicz; May 12, 1936; Dzisna (Wilno Voivodeship), Poland
- Died: February 28, 2021 (aged 84)
- Citizenship: American (naturalized 1976)
- Education: Medical University of Warsaw, Poland
- Known for: The development of cytometry methods for single-cell analysis; the TUNEL assay
- Spouse: Elizabeth T. Darzynkiewicz
- Children: Richard B. Darzynkiewicz, Robert J. Darzynkiewicz
- Awards: Distinguished Service Award, International Society for Analytical Cytology (ISAC), Officer's Cross of the Order of Merit of the Republic of Poland
- Scientific career
- Thesis: Studies of the Mechanism of Teratogenic Action of Insulin on Chicken Embryo. (1966)
- Academic advisors: Kazimierz Ostrowski

Zbigniew (DIM Zbyszek) Darzynkiewicz (ORCID 0000-0002-2040-7081) (Polish pronunciation: [zbiɡ.ɲɛf daʐɨŋkʲɛvit͡ʂ], DIM [zbɨ.ʂɛk]; born May 12, 1936, in Dzisna, Wilno Voivodeship, Poland – died February 28, 2021) was a Polish-American cell biologist active in cancer research and in developing new methods in histochemistry for flow cytometry.

== Early life and education ==
From 1945 to 1949, Darzynkiewicz attended a primary school in Dzierżoniów, Poland. He spent his high school years (1949–1953) in Skarżysko-Kamienna, Poland. His application to the University of Warsaw's Department of Physics was denied by the communist Social Justice Committee, who viewed him as an "enemy of the people." However, following the intervention of Regina Uszyńska, his high school principal, Darzynkiewicz was permitted to submit an application to the Medical University of Warsaw in the fall of 1953.

He earned his M.D. from the Medical University of Warsaw, Poland (1953–1960). From 1962 to 1965, he was a predoctoral fellow at the Department of Histology, Medical University of Warsaw. From 1965 to 1966, he was a visiting scientist at the Department of Pharmacology, the State University of New York at Buffalo. During and shortly after this period, he published his first manuscripts in Nature and Science journals. In 1966, the Faculty Council of the Medical University of Warsaw granted him the degree of Doctor of Medical Sciences (equivalent to a Ph.D.).

== Emigration to the United States ==
One month after the Soviet Union-led Warsaw Pact troops invaded Czechoslovakia in September 1968, Darzynkiewicz left Poland for Sweden on a tourist visa, refused to return, and soon after applied for an immigration visa to the United States. He arrived in the United States in 1969.

== Career ==
From September 1968 to September 1969, Darzynkiewicz was a visiting scientist at the Laboratory of Cell Research, Karolinska Institute, Stockholm, Sweden, working under the supervision of Nils R. Ringertz. In Ringertz's laboratory, Darzynkiewicz met Endre A. Balazs, who offered him a research position in the United States. From 1969 to 1974, Darzynkiewicz worked as a staff scientist at the Department of Connective Tissue Research, Boston Biomedical Research Institute in Boston, MA. From March 1974 to December 1975, he was Research Associate at Memorial Sloan-Kettering Cancer Center, New York, NY. From January 1976 to March 1978, he was an assistant professor, from June 1978 to June 1988, an associate professor, and finally, from July 1988 to September 1990, a full professor at Cornell University, Graduate School of Medical Sciences, New York, NY. From January 1986 to September 1990, he was the Head of the Laboratory of Experimental Cell Research, Memorial Sloan-Kettering Cancer Center.

In October 1990, Darzynkiewicz became a professor of medicine at New York Medical College – a member of the Touro College and University System, Valhalla, NY, and the director of the Brander Cancer Research Institute, New York Medical College. From 1991 he also served as a professor of Microbiology and Immunology and Professor of Pathology at New York Medical College.

Since 1972, the National Institutes of Health, including the prestigious MERIT award, have provided continuous funding for his research. In addition to receiving a NASA grant to develop cell analysis technologies applicable to the microgravity conditions of the International Space Station, his research was also supported by a number of private cancer research foundations.

Darzynkiewicz has published over 780 peer-reviewed articles, has edited, co-edited, and co-authored 15 books, and was granted eight US patents. As of October 2022, his 1992 manuscript entitled "Features of apoptotic cells measured by flow cytometry," published in Cytometry Part A has been cited over 1800 times.

He served as the president of the Cell Cycle Society (1986–1987) and the president of the International Society for Advancement of Cytometry (1993–1994). He was the Editor-in-Chief of the Open Medicine, a co-founder and an Associate Editor of Cytometry Part A, and an Editor of Current Protocols in Cytometry.

== Research interests ==
Darzynkiewicz's research centered on cell biology, with an emphasis on cancer cell growth and the regulatory mechanisms associated with cell growth and cell cycle progression. The most significant scientific contribution made by Darzynkiewicz is his discovery that the process of cell death is equally as significant as the cell cycle, thereby connecting conceptually and methodologically apoptosis to cell division. Darzynkiewicz is also recognized for developing the TUNEL assay (terminal deoxynucleotidyl transferase dUTP nick end labeling), which continues to be one of the most popular methods for measuring apoptosis. He also contributed significantly to the investigation of mechanisms of cell death induced by tumor necrosis factor (TNF). The connection between cell death and cell cycle progression has led Darzynkiewicz and his collaborators to further studies on the cell cycle-dependent effect of anticancer drugs and the death of cells during specific phases of the cell cycle caused by topoisomerase inhibitors and lovastatin.

== Selected notable peer-reviewed papers ==
- Darzynkiewicz, Z. (2020). 40 years of my venture with cytometry. Cytometry Part A, 97(6), 557–562. https://doi.org/10.1002/cyto.a.24043
- Darzynkiewicz, Z., Bruno, S., Del Bino, G., Gorczyca, W., Hotz, M. A., Lassota, P., & Traganos, F. (1992). Features of apoptotic cells measured by flow cytometry. Cytometry, 13(8), 795–808. https://doi.org/10.1002/cyto.990130802
- Darzynkiewicz, Z., Juan, G., Li, X., Gorczyca, W., Murakami, T., & Traganos, F. (1997). Cytometry in cell necrobiology: Analysis of apoptosis and accidental cell death (necrosis). Cytometry, 27(1), 1–20. https://doi.org/10/bdr2fz
- Evenson, D. P., Darzynkiewicz, Z., & Melamed, M. R. (1980). Relation of mammalian sperm chromatin heterogeneity to fertility. Science, 210(4474), 1131–1133. https://doi.org/10.1126/science.7444440
- Gong, J. P., Traganos, F., & Darzynkiewicz, Z. (1994). A selective procedure for DNA extraction from apoptotic cells applicable for gel electrophoresis and flow cytometry. Analytical Biochemistry, 218(2), 314–319. https://doi.org/10.1006/abio.1994.1184
- Gorczyca, W., Gong, J., & Darzynkiewicz, Z. (1993). Detection of DNA strand breaks in individual apoptotic cells by the in situ terminal deoxynucleotidyl transferase and nick translation assays. Cancer Research, 53(8), 1945–1951.
- Gorczyca, W., Traganos, F., Jesionowska, H., & Darzynkiewicz, Z. (1993). Presence of DNA strand breaks and increased sensitivity of DNA in situ to denaturation in abnormal human sperm cells: Analogy to apoptosis of somatic cells. Experimental Cell Research, 207(1), 202–205. https://doi.org/10.1006/excr.1993.1182
- Pozarowski, P., & Darzynkiewicz, Z. (2004). Analysis of cell cycle by flow cytometry. In A. H. Schönthal (Ed.), Checkpoint Controls and Cancer: Volume 2: Activation and Regulation Protocols (pp. 301–311). Humana Press. https://doi.org/10.1385/1-59259-811-0:30

== Honors ==
His professional affiliations include member (foreign) of the Polish Academy of Sciences and of the Polish Academy of Learning.

Darzynkiewicz was the recipient of an honorary degree from the Medical University of Warsaw in Poland, the Maria Skłodowska-Curie Award from the Jozef Pilsudski Institute in America, and the Casimir Funk Award from the Polish Institute of Arts and Sciences of America.

In 2002 he received Distinguished Service Award from the International Society for Analytical Cytology (ISAC). In 2009 he became a Fellow of the College of American Institute for Medical and Biological Engineering (AIMBE) in recognition for "developing and applying techniques to assess the cell cycle, cell kinetics, cellular apoptosis, tumor response, and progression."

== Interactions with Poland ==
Darzynkiewicz was a founding member of the Kosciuszko Foundation Collegium of Eminent Scientists of Polish Origin and Ancestry, and a trustee of the Kosciuszko Foundation. From 1986 to 1999, he was an advisory board member of The Alfred Jurzykowski Foundation, which annually awarded the Jurzykowski Prize. In 1995 He was a recipient of the Officer's Cross of the Order of Merit of the Republic of Poland.
