= Open Medicine =

Open Medicine may refer to medical journals:

- Open Medicine (De Gruyter journal), with the ISO abbreviation Open Med. (Wars.), a journal published by De Gruyter Open, known as the Central European Journal of Medicine from 2006 to 2014
- Open Medicine (John Willinsky journal), with the ISO abbreviation Open Med., a journal published by John Willinsky from 2007 to 2014

== See also ==
- Open Medicine Journal, a journal published by Bentham Open
