= Environmental Health and Preventive Medicine =

- Discipline: Environmental health, preventive medicine
- Language: English
- Edited by: Yoshihiro Kokubo

Publication details
- History: 1996-present
- Publisher: Komiyama Printing Co. Ltd (Japan)
- Impact factor: 3.674 (2020)

Standard abbreviations
- ISO 4: Environ. Health Prev. Med.

Indexing
- CODEN: EHPMF7
- ISSN: 1342-078X (print); 1347-4715 (web)
- OCLC no.: 35836154

Links
- Journal homepage; PubMed archive; BMC online archive

Environmental Health and Preventive Medicine is a peer-reviewed open access medical journal covering preventive medicine and environmental health. It was established in 1996 and is the official journal of the Japanese Society for Hygiene. It was published by BioMed Central until 2021 before taken over by Komiyama Printing Co. Ltd. The editor-in-chief is Yoshihiro Kokubo (National Cerebral and Cardiovascular Center, Osaka, Japan). According to the Journal Citation Reports, the journal has a 2020 impact factor of 3.674, and ranked in the first quartile of the category for public, environmental and occupational health.
