= BMC Cardiovascular Disorders =

Academic journal published by BioMed Central

- Discipline: Cardiology
- Language: English

Publication details
- Publisher: BioMed Central
- Frequency: Continuous
- Open access: Yes
- License: Creative Commons Licenses
- Impact factor: 2.4 (2022)

Standard abbreviations
- ISO 4: BMC Cardiovasc. Disord.

Indexing
- ISSN: 1471-2261

Links
- Journal homepage

BMC Cardiovascular Disorders is a peer-reviewed open-access scientific journal that covers the field of cardiovascular diseases, focusing on areas such as pathophysiology, genetics, and pharmacology.

== Abstracting and indexing ==
The journal is abstracted and indexed, for example, in:

- DOAJ
- EBSCO databases
- ProQuest
- Scopus
- Science Citation Index Expanded

According to the Journal Citation Reports, the journal had an impact factor of 2.4 in 2022.
