= C4SS =

C4SS may refer to:

- Center for Security Studies, a scientific center at the Metropolitan University Prague
- Center for a Stateless Society, a market anarchism-oriented think tank
