= HIFA (disambiguation) =

HIFA or Healthcare Information For All is a global healthcare information network

HIFA may also refer to:

- Harare International Festival of the Arts
- Hubei Institute of Fine Arts
