= Maria Amaral =

Maria Amaral may refer to:

- Maria Amaral (sport shooter) (1931–2016), Brazilian sports shooter
- Maria Adelaide Amaral (born 1942), Portuguese Brazilian playwright, screenwriter, and novelist
- Maria Lúcia Amaral (born 1957), Portuguese lawyer, university professor, politician and judge
- Maria do Carmo Estanislau do Amaral (born 1959), Brazilian botanist, biologist, curator, and academic
