= Journal of Experimental & Clinical Cancer Research =

- Discipline: Oncology
- Language: English
- Edited by: Mauro Castelli

Publication details
- History: 1982-present
- Publisher: BioMed Central
- Frequency: Quarterly
- Open access: Yes
- License: Creative Commons Attribution License 4.0
- Impact factor: 12.658 (2021)

Standard abbreviations
- ISO 4: J. Exp. Clin. Cancer Res.

Indexing
- ISSN: 0392-9078 (print); 1756-9966 (web)
- LCCN: 83007867
- OCLC no.: 10009183

Links
- Journal homepage; Online archive

The Journal of Experimental & Clinical Cancer Research is a quarterly peer-reviewed open-access medical journal covering cancer research. It was established in 1982 and has been published by BioMed Central since 2008. It is the official journal of the Regina Elena National Cancer Institute. The editor-in-chief is Mauro Castelli (Regina Elena National Cancer Institute). According to the Journal Citation Reports, the journal has a 2021 impact factor of 12.658.
