= Chiropractic & Manual Therapies =

- Discipline: Chiropractic
- Language: English
- Edited by: Bruce F. Walker

Publication details
- Former names: Australasian Chiropractic & Osteopathy, Chiropractic & Osteopathy
- History: 1996-present
- Publisher: BioMed Central
- Open access: Yes

Standard abbreviations
- ISO 4: Chiropr. Man. Ther.

Indexing
- ISSN: 2045-709X
- LCCN: 2011243051
- OCLC no.: 909881198
- Chiropractic & Osteopathy
- ISSN: 1746-1340
- Australasian Chiropractic & Osteopathy
- ISSN: 1328-0384

Links
- Journal homepage; PubMed archives

Chiropractic & Manual Therapies is a peer-reviewed medical journal covering chiropractic, osteopathy and manual therapies. It is published by BioMed Central and is the official journal of Chiropractic Australia, the European Chiropractors Union, The Royal College of Chiropractors and Kiropraktornes Videnscenter. The journal was established in 1996 as the Australasian Chiropractic & Osteopathy and renamed Chiropractic & Osteopathy in 2004, before obtaining its current name in 2011.

== Abstracting and indexing ==
The journal is abstracted and indexed in CINAHL, Embase, Emerging Sources Citation Index, and Scopus.
