= Genetics Selection Evolution =

- Discipline: Genetics, animal genetics, genomics
- Language: English
- Edited by: Didier Boichard, Mario Calus, Jack Dekkers, Thomas Faraut

Publication details
- Former names: Annales de Génétique et de Sélection Animales; Génétique, Sélection, Évolution
- History: 1969–present
- Publisher: BioMed Central
- Frequency: Continuous
- Open access: Yes
- Impact factor: 4.4 (2025)

Standard abbreviations
- ISO 4: Genet. Sel. Evol.

Indexing
- CODEN: GSEVE9
- ISSN: 0999-193X (print); 1297-9686 (web)
- LCCN: 2009268505
- OCLC no.: 644311163

Links
- Journal homepage; Online archive

Genetics Selection Evolution is a bimonthly peer-reviewed scientific journal that covers original research on all aspects of genetics and selection in domestic animal species and other species providing results of immediate interest for farm animals' genetics.

It was established in 1969 as the Annales de Génétique et de Sélection Animales. It was renamed Génétique, Sélection, Évolution in 1983, obtaining its current name in 1989. Since January 2009, it has been published as an open access journal by BioMed Central. It is owned by the Institut national de recherche pour l'agriculture, l'alimentation et l'environnement of which it is an official journal. The editors-in-chief are Didier Boichard (INRAE), Mario Calus (Wageningen University), Jack Dekkers (Iowa State University), and Thomas Faraut (INRAE). According to the Journal Citation Reports, the journal has a 2025 impact factor of 4.4.
