= BMC Molecular and Cell Biology =

Academic journal published by BioMed Central

- Discipline: Molecular biology and Cell biology
- Language: English

Publication details
- Publisher: BioMed Central
- Frequency: Continuous
- Open access: Yes
- License: Creative Commons Licenses
- Impact factor: 2.4 (2023)

Standard abbreviations
- ISO 4: BMC Mol. Cell Biol.

Indexing
- ISSN: 2661-8850

Links
- Journal homepage

BMC Molecular and Cell Biology is a peer-reviewed open-access scientific journal that covers the fields of molecular and cell biology, focusing on areas such as signal transduction, gene expression, and cellular processes.

== Abstracting and indexing ==
The journal is abstracted and indexed, for example, in:

- DOAJ
- EBSCO databases
- ProQuest
- Scopus
- Science Citation Index Expanded

According to the Journal Citation Reports, the journal had an impact factor of 2.4 in 2023.
