= APEM =

APEM may refer to:

- World Student Press Agency (French: Agence de presse étudiante mondiale), a Canadian student news agency
- Advances in Production Engineering & Management, a scientific journal

== See also ==
- Kue apem, an Indonesian cake
