= Marincola =

Marincola is a surname. Notable people with the surname include:

- Elizabeth Marincola, American activist
- Giorgio Marincola (1923–1945), Somali-Italian partisan
- Giovanni Paolo Marincola (died 1588), Italian Roman Catholic bishop
- Paula Marincola, American art critic and curator
