= BMC Structural Biology =

- Discipline: Structural biology
- Language: English

Publication details
- History: 2001–2019
- Publisher: BioMed Central
- Frequency: Upon acceptance
- Open access: Yes
- License: Creative Commons Attribution 4.0
- Impact factor: 2.222 (2013)

Standard abbreviations
- ISO 4: BMC Struct. Biol.

Indexing
- ISSN: 1472-6807
- OCLC no.: 47666349

Links
- Journal homepage

BMC Structural Biology was an open access peer-reviewed scientific journal that covered research in structural biology. The journal was established in 2001 and was published by BioMed Central. The editor-in-chief was Simon Harold. The journal ceased publication and was integrated into BMC Molecular and Cell Biology in 2019.
