= BMC Plant Biology =

Academic journal published by BioMed Central

- Discipline: Plant biology
- Language: English

Publication details
- History: 2001–present
- Publisher: BioMed Central
- Frequency: Continuous
- Open access: Yes
- License: Creative Commons Attribution
- Impact factor: 4.3 (2023)

Standard abbreviations
- ISO 4: BMC Plant Biol.

Indexing
- CODEN: BPBMAN
- ISSN: 1471-2229
- LCCN: 2002262012
- OCLC no.: 49016366

Links
- Journal homepage; Online archive

BMC Plant Biology is a peer-reviewed open-access scientific journal that covers the field of plant biology, focusing on areas such as plant genetics, plant physiology, and plant-environment interactions. Editorial decisions are "largely based on the soundness of the research presented rather than the novelty or potential impact of the work".

== Abstracting and indexing ==
The journal is abstracted and indexed in:

- Biological Abstracts
- BIOSIS Previews
- Current Contents/Agriculture, Biology & Environmental Sciences
- Directory of Open Access Journals
- EBSCO databases
- Embase]
- Index Medicus/MEDLINE/PubMed
- ProQuest databases
- Science Citation Index Expanded
- Scopus

According to the Journal Citation Reports, the journal had an impact factor of 4.3 in 2023.
