= BMC Veterinary Research =

- Language: English
- Edited by: Hayley Henderson, Jennifer Harman

Publication details
- History: 2005–present
- Publisher: BioMed Central
- Impact factor: 2.6 (2024)

Standard abbreviations
- ISO 4: BMC Vet. Res.

Indexing
- ISSN: 1746-6148
- LCCN: 2006249048
- OCLC no.: 61233340

Links
- Journal homepage

BMC Veterinary Research is a peer-reviewed open access veterinary science and medical journal that launched in 2005 published by BioMed Central. Part of the BMC Series of journals, it has a broad scope covering all aspects of veterinary science and medicine, including the epidemiology, diagnosis, prevention and treatment of medical conditions of domestic, farm and wild animals, as well as the biomedical processes that underlie their health.

== Abstracting and indexing ==
The journal is abstracted and indexed by PubMed, MEDLINE, CAS, EMBASE, Scopus, Current Contents, CABI and Web of Science. According to the Journal Citation Reports, its 2-year impact factor was 2.6 in 2024.
