= PLOS Clinical Trials =

- Discipline: General medicine
- Language: English

Publication details
- History: 2006–2007
- Publisher: PLoS

Standard abbreviations
- ISO 4: PLOS Clin. Trials

Indexing
- ISSN: 1555-5887
- OCLC no.: 58994937

Links
- Journal homepage

PLOS Clinical Trials was a scientific journal covering randomized trials from all medical and public health disciplines. It has been discontinued and is now rolled into PLOS ONE.
