= Trials (journal) =

- Discipline: General medicine
- Language: English
- Edited by: Jeremy Grimshaw, Tianjing Li, Shaun Treweek, Peter Jüni

Publication details
- History: 2006-present
- Publisher: BioMed Central
- Frequency: Upon acceptance
- Open access: Yes
- License: Creative Commons Attribution
- Impact factor: 1.975 (2018)

Standard abbreviations
- ISO 4: Trials

Indexing
- CODEN: TRIACW
- ISSN: 1745-6215
- LCCN: 2006243052
- OCLC no.: 63290284

Links
- Journal homepage

Trials is an open access peer-reviewed medical journal covering performance and outcomes of randomized controlled trials. The journal is published by BioMed Central; the editors-in-chief are Jeremy Grimshaw (Ottawa Health Research Institute), Peter Jüni (University of Toronto), Tianjing Li (Johns Hopkins Bloomberg School of Public Health), and Shaun Treweek (University of Aberdeen). It also publishes study protocols.

== Abstracting and indexing ==
The journal is abstracted and indexed in:

- Chemical Abstracts Service
- Current Contents
- Embase
- MEDLINE/PubMed
- Science Citation Index Expanded
- Scopus

According to the Journal Citation Reports, the journal has a 2018 impact factor of 1.975.
