= Advances in Group Theory and Applications =

- Discipline: Mathematics (group theory)
- Language: English
- Edited by: Marco Trombetti

Publication details
- History: 2015–present
- Publisher: Aracne
- Open access: Yes

Standard abbreviations
- ISO 4: Adv. Group Theory Appl.

Indexing
- ISSN: 2499-1287

Links
- Journal homepage

Advances in Group Theory and Applications (AGTA) is a peer reviewed, open access research journal in mathematics, specifically group theory. It was founded in 2015 by the council of the no-profit association AGTA - Advances in Group Theory and Applications, and is published by Aracne.

The journal is composed of three sections. The main one contains mathematical research papers, while the two other sections are respectively devoted to historical papers and open problems.

The journal is published as a diamond open access journal, meaning that the content is immediately freely available to the readers, and the authors do not have to pay any author publication fees.

The journal is abstracted and indexed by Mathematical Reviews and Zentralblatt MATH.

== Sections ==
=== A_{D}V – The History behind Group Theory ===
The purpose of this section is to present historical documents, biographical notes and discussions on relevant aspects of group theory and its applications.

=== A_{D}V – Perspectives in Group Theory ===
The open problems submitted to the journal are published in this section.

== Reinhold Baer Prize sponsorship ==
The journal started co-sponsoring the Reinhold Baer Prize in 2017.

== Proceedings ==
Volume 15 publishes the proceedings of the conference Groups & Algebras in Bicocca for Young algebraists 2022.
