= BMC Bioinformatics =

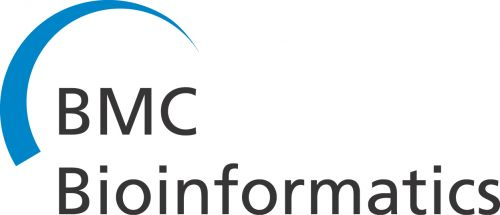
- Discipline: Bioinformatics
- Language: English
- Edited by: Alison Cuff

Publication details
- History: 2000–present
- Publisher: BioMed Central (United Kingdom)
- Open access: Yes
- Impact factor: 2.9 (2023)

Standard abbreviations
- ISO 4: BMC Bioinform.

Indexing
- CODEN: BBMIC4
- ISSN: 1471-2105
- LCCN: 2001243458
- OCLC no.: 48656745

Links
- Journal homepage; Online access; Online archive

BMC Bioinformatics is a peer-reviewed open access scientific journal covering bioinformatics and computational biology published by BioMed Central. It was established in 2000, and has been one of the fastest growing and most successful journals in the BMC Series of journals, publishing 1,000 articles in its first five years. Some of the topics that the journal covers are: bioinformatics software development, algorithms, text-mining, and modeling of biological knowledge.

== Abstracting and indexing ==
The journal is abstracted and indexed in:

- Biological Abstracts
- BIOSIS
- Chemical Abstracts Service
- Embase
- EmBiology
- EmCare
- MEDLINE/PubMed
- Science Citation Index Expanded
- Scopus

According to the Journal Citation Reports, the journal has a 2023 impact factor of 2.9.
