= BMC Pharmacology and Toxicology =

Academic journal published by BioMed Central

- Discipline: Pharmacology, Toxicology
- Language: English

Publication details
- Publisher: BioMed Central
- Frequency: Continuous
- Open access: Yes
- License: Creative Commons Licenses
- Impact factor: 2.9 (2022)

Standard abbreviations
- ISO 4: BMC Pharmacol. Toxicol.

Indexing
- ISSN: 2050-6511

Links
- Journal homepage

BMC Pharmacology and Toxicology is a peer-reviewed open-access scientific journal that covers the field of pharmacology and toxicology, focusing on areas such as drug action, toxicology, and clinical pharmacology. The journal is published by BioMed Central.

The journal publishes research articles, reviews, and commentaries related to pharmacology and toxicology.

== Abstracting and indexing ==
The journal is abstracted and indexed, for example, in:

- DOAJ
- EBSCO databases
- ProQuest
- Scopus
- Science Citation Index Expanded

According to the Journal Citation Reports, the journal had an impact factor of 2.9 in 2022.
