= BMC Microbiology =

Academic journal published by BioMed Central

- Discipline: Microbiology
- Language: English

Publication details
- History: 2001–present
- Publisher: BioMed Central
- Open access: Yes
- Impact factor: 5.4 (2025)

Standard abbreviations
- ISO 4: BMC Microbiol.

Indexing
- ISSN: 1471-2180

Links
- Journal homepage

BMC Microbiology is a peer-reviewed open-access scientific journal that covers microorganisms and various aspects of microbiology. The journal was established in 2001 and is published by BioMed Central.

The associate editor is Vasco Giovagnetti. The journal publishes research articles, reviews, and commentaries related to microorganisms, including bacteria, archaea, fungi, and viruses.

== Abstracting and indexing ==
The journal is abstracted and indexed, for example, in:

- DOAJ
- EBSCO databases
- ProQuest
- Scopus
- Science Citation Index Expanded

According to the Journal Citation Reports, the journal has a 2025 impact factor of 5.4.
