= BMC Psychiatry =

Academic journal published by BioMed Central

- Discipline: Psychiatry, Mental health, Clinical psychology
- Language: English

Publication details
- History: 2001–present
- Publisher: BioMed Central
- Frequency: Continuous
- Open access: Yes
- License: Creative Commons Licenses
- Impact factor: 3.4 (2023)

Standard abbreviations
- ISO 4: BMC Psychiatry

Indexing
- ISSN: 1471-244X

Links
- Journal homepage

BMC Psychiatry is a peer-reviewed open-access scientific journal that covers the field of psychiatry, focusing on areas such as mental health disorders, clinical interventions, and psychosocial research.

== Abstracting and indexing ==
The journal is abstracted and indexed, for example, in:

- DOAJ
- EBSCO databases
- ProQuest
- Scopus
- Science Citation Index Expanded

According to the Journal Citation Reports, the journal had an impact factor of 3.4 in 2023.
