= BMC Endocrine Disorders =

- Language: English

Publication details
- History: 2001–present
- Publisher: BioMed Central
- Open access: yes
- Impact factor: 1.994 (2020)

Standard abbreviations
- ISO 4: BMC Endocr. Disord.

Indexing
- ISSN: 1472-6823

Links
- Journal homepage

BMC Endocrine Disorders is a peer-reviewed open-access medical journal covering research in all aspects of the prevention, diagnosis, and management of endocrine disorders, as well as related molecular genetics, pathophysiology, and epidemiology.
