= BMC Biomedical Engineering =

Academic journal published by BioMed Central

- Discipline: Biomedicine
- Language: English

Publication details
- Publisher: BioMed Central

Standard abbreviations
- ISO 4: BMC Biomed. Eng.

Indexing
- ISSN: 2524-4426

Links
- Journal homepage

BMC Biomedical Engineering is a peer-reviewed open-access scientific journal that covers the interdisciplinary field of biomedical engineering, encompassing aspects such as biomaterials, bioinformatics, biomechanics, and medical imaging.

The associate editor is Sara Zandomeneghi, with Biyas Bandyopadhyay, serving as the assistant editor. The journal publishes research articles, reviews, and commentaries related to the application of engineering principles and design concepts to medicine and biology for healthcare purposes.

== Abstracting and indexing ==
The journal is abstracted and indexed, for example, in:

- DOAJ
- EBSCO databases
- ProQuest
- PubMed Central
