= Maria do Carmo Estanislau do Amaral =

Brazilian botanist (born 1958)

Maria do Carmo Estanislau do Amaral ForMemRS
- Born: 1959 (age 66–67); Capivari, Brasil
- Education: Universidad de São Paulo (BSc, MSc); Universität Hamburg (PhD)
- Known for: naming, in the 21st century, new genera, species, and subspecies for science
- Scientific career
- Fields: Botany; Biology, Curatorship
- Institutions: Universidad Estatal de Campinas
- Thesis: A divisão genérica da família Ochnaceae DC., com especial atenção à subfamília Sauvagesioideae Lindl. (2010) (A generic division of the Ochnaceae DC family, with special attention to the Sauvagesioideae Lindl subfamília. (2010)) (2010)
- Doctoral advisor: Klaus Kubitzki (1933)
- Author abbrev. (botany): M.C.E.Amaral

Maria do Carmo Estanislau do Amaral (Note: This last name uses the Portuguese name system. The first part of the surname is maternal, Carmo Estanisalu, and the second part is paternal, Amaral, convention means she is indexed under Amaral.) (born 1959) is a Brazilian botanist, biologist, curator, and academic., who has worked, since 2011, on teaching and research in the Department of Biology, Universidad Estatal de Campinas.

== Biography ==
In 1980, she obtained a Bachelor of Biological Sciences from the University of São Paulo, and in 1985, a Master in Biological Sciences (Botany) from the same institution, defending the thesis supervised by Dr. Antonio Salatino, Epicuticular wax of aquatic plants. In 1990, she obtained a PhD in Natural Sciences from the Universität Hamburg, Germany.

Since 1993 she has been a professor at the Universidad Estatal de Campinas. She works in botany, with an emphasis on seed plant taxonomy, researching the following topics: phylogenetic systematics, macromolecular systematics, interactive multiple access keys, Ochnaceae, Commelinaceae, Orchidaceae, aquatic plants, and the flora of São Paulo.

In 2012, she worked on post-doctorate research at the Universität Zürich, with a grant from the Fundação de Amparo à Pesquisa do Estado de São Paulo, FAPESP, Brazil.

== Selected publications ==
Some of her most cited publications are:

- MCE Amaral, 1991, Phylogenetische systematik der Ochnaceae, Bot. Jahrb. Syst 113 (1), 105-196
- AM Giulietti, MCE Amaral, V Bittrich, 1995, Phylogenetic analysis of inter-and infrageneric relationships of Leiothrix Ruhland (Eriocaulaceae), Kew Bulletin, 55-71
- V Bittrich, MCE Amaral, 1996, Flower morphology and pollination biology of some Clusia species from the Gran Sabana (Venezuela), Kew Bulletin, 681-694
- V Bittrich, MCE Amaral, 1996, Pollination biology of Symphonia globulifera (Clusiaceae), Plant Systematics and Evolution 200 (1-2), 101-110
- V Bittrich, MCE Amaral, 1997, Floral biology of some Clusia species from Central Amazonia, Kew Bulletin, 617-635
- ALM Porto, SMF Machado, CMA de Oliveira, V Bittrich, ..., 2000, Polyisoprenylated benzophenones from Clusia floral resins, Phytochemistry 55 (7), 755-768
- MG Reis, AD Faria, V Bittrich, MCE Amaral, AJ Marsaioli, 2000, The chemistry of flower rewards—Oncidium (Orchidaceae), Journal of the Brazilian Chemical Society 11 (6), 600-608
- MG Reis, AD de Faria, MCE do Amaral, AJ Marsaioli, 2003, Oncidinol—a novel diacylglycerol from Ornithophora radicans Barb. Rodr.(Orchidaceae) floral oil, Tetrahedron Letters 44 (46), 8519-8523
- A Flach, RC Dondon, RB Singer, S Koehler, EA Maria do Carmo, ..., 2004, The chemistry of pollination in selected Brazilian Maxillariinae orchids: floral rewards and fragrance, Journal of Chemical Ecology 30 (5), 1045-1056
- RB Singer, A Flach, S Koehler, AJ Marsaioli, MCE Amaral, 2004, Sexual mimicry in Mormolyca ringens (Lindl.) Schltr.(Orchidaceae: Maxillariinae), Annals of Botany 93 (6), 755-762
- MCE Do Amaral, E Hardy, EM Hebling, A Faúndes, 2005, Menstruation and amenorrhea: opinion of Brazilian women, Contraception 72 (2), 157-161
- A Ruiz, EG Magalhães, AF Magalhães, AD Faria, MCE Amaral, ..., 2005, Avaliação da atividade tóxica em Artemia salina e Biomphalaria glabrata de extratos de quatro espécies do gênero Eleocharis (Cyperaceae), Revista Brasileira de Farmacognosia 15 (2), 98-102
- A Flach, AJ Marsaioli, RB Singer, EA Maria Do Carmo, C Menezes, ..., 2006, Pollination by Sexual Mimicry in Mormolyca ringens: A Floral Chemistry that Remarkably Matches the Pheromones of Virgin Queens of Scaptotrigona sp., Journal of Chemical Ecology 32 (1), 59-70
- MG Reis, AD de Faria, IA Dos Santos, EA Maria do Carmo, AJ Marsaioli, 2007, Byrsonic acid—the clue to floral mimicry involving oil-producing flowers and oil-collecting bees, Journal of chemical ecology 33 (7), 1421-1429
- MCE Amaral, 2008, Guia de campo para plantas aquáticas e palustres do Estado de São Paulo, Holos Editora
- ER Pansarin, MCE Amaral, 2008, Reproductive biology and pollination mechanisms of Epidendrum secundum (Orchidaceae). Floral variation: a consequence of natural hybridization?, Plant Biology 10 (2), 211-219
- MW Chase, NH Williams, AD de Faria, KM Neubig, MCE Amaral, ...., 2009, Floral convergence in Oncidiinae (Cymbidieae; Orchidaceae): an expanded concept of Gomesa and a new genus Nohawilliamsia, Annals of Botany 104 (3), 387-402
- ER Pansarin, MCE do Amaral, 2009, Reproductive biology and pollination of southeastern Brazilian Stanhopea Frost ex Hook.(Orchidaceae), Flora-Morphology, Distribution, Functional Ecology of Plants 204 (3), 238-249
- DC Zappi, FLR Filardi, P Leitman, VC Souza, BMT Walter, JR Pirani, ..., 2015, Growing knowledge: an overview of seed plant diversity in Brazil, Rodriguésia 66 (4), 1085-1113
- FLR Filardi, F Barros, JFA Baumgratz, CEM Bicudo, TB Cavalcanti, ..., 2018, Brazilian Flora 2020: innovation and collaboration to meet Target 1 of the Global Strategy for Plant Conservation (GSPC), Rodriguésia 69 (4), 1513-1527

=== Memberships ===
- Sociedad Botánica de Brasil

=== Periodical reviewer ===
- 2010–present: Phytotaxa (online)
- 2009–present: Novon (Saint Louis, Mo.)
- 2010–present: Brittonia (Bronx, N.Y.)
- 2010–present: Revista Brasileira de Botânica (print)
- 2011–present: Rodriguésia (print)
- 2011–present: Acta Botanica Brasilica (print)
- 2012–present: Botanical Journal of the Linnean Society (print)
- 2016–present: F.R.L.M.S.S.

=== Research Projects Supervisor ===
- 2000–present: Conselho Nacional de Desenvolvimento Científico e Tecnológico
- 1995–present: Fundação de Amparo à Pesquisa do Estado de São Paulo
- 2008–present: Deutscher Akademischer Austauschdienst
- 2007–present: Fundação de Amparo à Pesquisa do Estado da Bahia
- 2000–present: Serviço de Apoio ao Estudante - UNICAMP
