= Arthritis Research & Therapy =

- Discipline: Rheumatology
- Language: English
- Edited by: Christopher Buckley, Harris Perlman

Publication details
- Former name: Arthritis Research
- History: 1999–present
- Publisher: BioMed Central
- Frequency: Continuous
- Impact factor: 4.269 (2017)

Standard abbreviations
- ISO 4: Arthritis Res. Ther.

Indexing
- ISSN: 1478-6354 (print); 1478-6362 (web)
- OCLC no.: 51648457

Links
- Journal homepage; Online archive

Arthritis Research & Therapy, formerly Arthritis Research, is a peer-reviewed open access medical journal covering the field of cellular and molecular mechanisms of arthritis, musculoskeletal conditions, and systemic autoimmune rheumatic diseases. It is published by BioMed Central, part of Springer Nature, and the editors-in-chief are Christopher Buckley (University of Birmingham and University of Oxford) and Harris Perlman (Northwestern University). The journal was established in 1999 as Arthritis Research, obtaining its current title in. The journal's print version ceased in 2010 with volume 12, number 6, and the journal converted to an online only format. According to the Journal Citation Reports, the journal has a 2017 impact factor of 4.269.
