= BMC Cancer =

- Discipline: Oncology
- Language: English

Publication details
- History: 2001–present
- Publisher: BioMed Central
- Impact factor: 3.4 (2023)

Standard abbreviations
- ISO 4: BMC Cancer

Indexing
- CODEN: BCMACL
- ISSN: 1471-2407
- LCCN: 2002243079
- OCLC no.: 45893944

Links
- Journal homepage

BMC Cancer is a peer-reviewed open access medical journal that publishes original research on cancer and oncology. It was established in 2001 at a time when open access publishing was in its infancy, and is published by BioMed Central. It was one of the first journals to be open access and exclusively published online.

== Abstracting and indexing ==
The journal is abstracted and indexed by PubMed, MEDLINE, CAS, EMBASE, Scopus, Current Contents, and CABI. According to the Journal Citation Reports, its 2-year impact factor was 3.4 in 2023.
