= Directorate of Medicinal and Aromatic Plants Research =

Indian research institute

- Motto in English: Health for All
- Established: 24, November 1992
- Affiliations: Indian Council of Agricultural Research
- Director: Dr. Manish Das
- Location: Anand, Gujarat, India
- Website: www.dmapr.org.in

The Directorate of Medicinal and Aromatic Plants Research is one of the 25 project directorates established by the Indian Council of Agricultural Research. It was established as National Research Centre for Medicinal and Aromatic Plants on 24 November 1992 at Boriavi in Anand district of Gujarat for the quality production, development of new varieties and development of good agricultural practices of medicinal and aromatic plants. The mandate crops of the institute are Aloe barbadensis, Withania somnifera, Plantago ovata, Cymbopogon flexuosus, Cymbopogon martinii, Chlorophytum borivilianum and Cassia angustifolia.

This institute has got outreach programme and it coordinates and monitors research work of 23 centres spread across the country working on various other medicinal and aromatic plants. To its credit, it has released 26 varieties of medicinal plants and seven varieties of aromatic plants. The DMAPR is also maintaining 830 germplasm of medicinal and aromatic plants at their Field Gene Bank.

The DMAPR houses Medicinal and Aromatic Plants Association of India which publishes the Open Access Journal of Medicinal and Aromatic Plants, a scholarly research open access journal related to medicinal and aromatic plants.
