= SORT (journal) =

- Discipline: Statistics
- Language: English

Publication details
- Former name: Qüestiió
- History: Qüestiió: 1977-2002, current title: 2003-present
- Publisher: Institut d'Estadística de Catalunya (Spain)
- Frequency: Biannually
- Open access: Yes

Standard abbreviations
- ISO 4: SORT

Indexing
- ISSN: 1696-2281
- OCLC no.: 54674505

Links
- Journal homepage

SORT or Statistics and Operations Research Transactions is a peer-reviewed open access scientific journal that publishes papers related to statistics. It is published by the Institut d'Estadística de Catalunya, the statistical office of Catalonia, in English with a brief summary in Catalan.

The journal was established in 2003, when it replaced the journal Qüestiió (Quaderns d'Estadística i Investigació Operativa, 1977–2002). It publishes two issues each year, and is available online as open access.

== Abstracting and indexing ==
SORT is indexed in the Current Index to Statistics, Science Citation Index Expanded, and Journal Citation Reports.
