= Open Engineering =

- Discipline: Engineering
- Language: English
- Edited by: William F. Ritter

Publication details
- Former name: Central European Journal of Engineering
- History: 2011-present
- Publisher: Walter de Gruyter
- Frequency: Continuous
- Open access: Yes
- License: Creative Commons-BY-NC-ND

Standard abbreviations
- ISO 4: Open Eng.

Indexing
- ISSN: 2391-5439
- OCLC no.: 912142816
- Central European Journal of Engineering
- ISSN: 1896-1541 (print); 2081-9927 (web)

Links
- Journal homepage; Journal page at Springer website

Open Engineering is a peer-reviewed open access scientific journal, covering all aspects of engineering, from electrical and computer engineering, civil and environmental, mechanical, and aerospace engineering, to materials science. The editor-in-chief is William F. Ritter (University of Delaware).

The journal was established in 2011 as the Central European Journal of Engineering. It was co-published by Springer Science+Business Media and Versita (since 2012 part of Walter de Gruyter). By the end of 2014 the journal was moved completely to the De Gruyter imprint, obtaining its current title and switching to full open access.

== Abstracting and indexing ==
The journal is abstracted and indexed in Astrophysics Data System, Chemical Abstracts Service, and Scopus.
