= Journal of Formalized Reasoning =

Open-access journal

- Discipline: Mathematical formalization
- Language: English
- Edited by: Andrea Asperti

Publication details
- History: 2008–present
- Publisher: University of Bologna (Italy)
- Frequency: Biannual
- Open access: Yes

Standard abbreviations
- ISO 4: J. Formaliz. Reason.

Indexing
- ISSN: 1972-5787
- OCLC no.: 456198191

Links
- Journal homepage; Online access; Online archive

The Journal of Formalized Reasoning is a peer-reviewed open access academic journal that publishes research on the formalization of mathematics, algorithms, and software systems, including work in classical mathematics, constructive mathematics, formal algorithms, and program verification. Established in 2009, it is maintained by AlmaDL, the digital library of the University of Bologna.

== Abstracting and indexing ==
The journal is abstracted and indexed in Scopus, MathSciNet, and Zentralblatt MATH.
