= Bangladesh Journal of Pharmacology =

- Discipline: Pharmacology
- Language: English
- Edited by: Mir Misbahuddin

Publication details
- History: 2006–present
- Publisher: Bangladesh Pharmacological Society (Bangladesh)
- Frequency: Quarterly
- Open access: Yes
- Impact factor: 1.6 (2022)

Standard abbreviations
- ISO 4: Bangladesh J. Pharmacol.

Indexing
- ISSN: 1991-007X (print); 1991-0088 (web)
- OCLC no.: 237219148

Links
- Journal homepage; Online access; Online archive

The Bangladesh Journal of Pharmacology is a quarterly peer-reviewed scientific journal published by the Bangladesh Pharmacological Society. The journal publishes papers on the studies of plant extracts or drugs on pharmacological effects using lab animals, human cell lines, and microbes. Video component of the methodology is also added. The editor-in-chief is Mir Misbahuddin MBBS, PhD.

== Abstracting and indexing ==
The journal is abstracted and indexed in:

- Academic Search Complete
- Biological Abstracts
- BIOSIS Previews
- CAB Abstracts
- Directory of Open Access Journals
- EMBASE/Excerpta Medica
- Global Health
- Science Citation Index Expanded
- Scopus
- Social Sciences Citation Index

According to the Journal Citation Reports, the journal has a 2022 impact factor of 1.6.
