= Metropolitan University Prague =

Private university in Prague, Czech Republic

- Metropolitní univerzita Praha
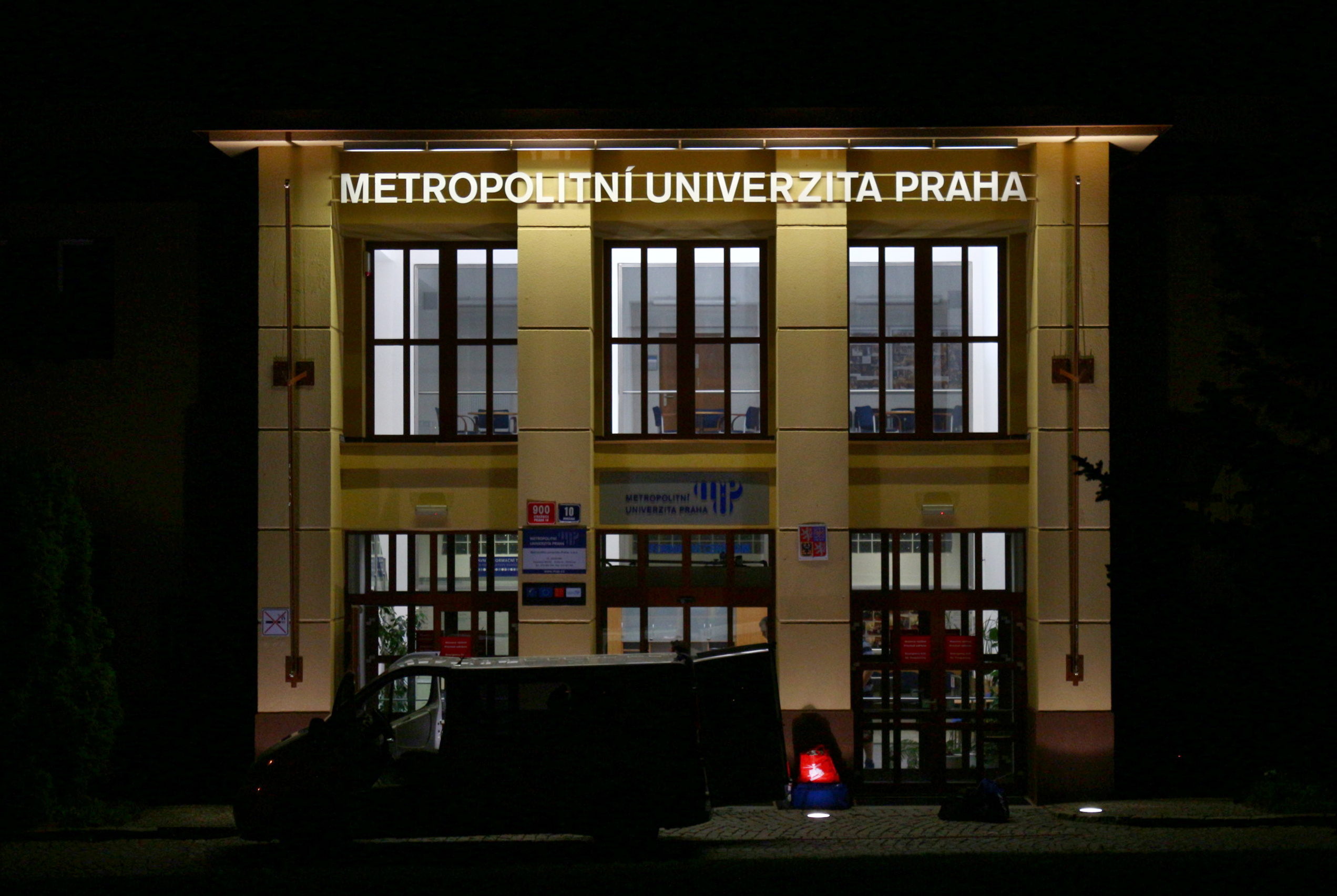
- Type: Private
- Established: 2001
- Rector: Michal Klíma
- Location: Prague, Czech Republic; 50°4′10.17″N 14°29′52.28″E
- Campus: Urban
- Website: http://www.mup.cz

Metropolitan University Prague (Czech: Metropolitní univerzita Praha, MUP) is one of the oldest and largest private universities in the Czech Republic. It was founded in 2001 as the University of Public Administration and International Relations. It has been ranked by the Czech Ministry of Education as the highest quality social science institution in the Czech Republic.

== History ==
The university was founded in 2001 and is among the oldest private tertiary education institutions in the Czech Republic. In 2007, the school received the status of a university according to the Czech education law, allowing it to carry out doctoral study programs. In the same year, the school change its name from the University of Public Administration and International Relations to Metropolitan University Prague. Since its foundation until 2023, the university has produced more than 17 thousand graduates.

== Academics ==
The university provides Bachelor, Master and Ph.D. studies as full-time or part-time study. Courses offered include: Anglophone Studies, International Trade, International Relations and European Studies (available in Czech and in English), International Relations and Asian Studies (available in Czech and English), Media Studies, Public Administration, Humanities and Asian Studies. The school hosts yearly around 200 students within the ERASMUS and ERASMUS+ programmes.

MUP is also recognized for its scientific and research activities in various social science fields. The university's academics actively contribute to numerous scientific projects both domestically and internationally, including grants awarded by the European Research Agency (REA), the Czech Science Foundation (CSF) and others. In terms of scientific performance, the university received the highest rating among all Czech private schools by the Government Council for Research, Development, and Innovation as of 2022.

MUP houses several scientific centers, including the Center for Security Studies (C4SS), the Centre for Middle Eastern Studies (CMES), the Ibero-American Centre, and the African Studies Centre (ASC).

The university hosts invited lectures by notable global figures. On Saturday, March 14, 2009, the university organized a conference titled "European Model for Peace in the Middle East," featuring a speech by Álvaro de Soto, a Peruvian diplomat and former Special Envoy of the United Nations for the Middle East peace process. On May 9, 2016, seven African ambassadors to the Czech Republic and high commissioners participated in a discussion with students on the future of Africa. On November 22, 2022, the Japanese ambassador Hideo Suzuki delivered a lecture at the university, and on December 13 of the same year, the Mexican ambassador R. Leonora Rueda gave a presentation at MUP.

Since 2007, the university's International Relations and European Studies Department has published a quarterly peer-reviewed academic journal entitled the Central European Journal of International and Security Studies.

== Alumni ==
Notable alumni include Jana Černochová, the Czech Minister of Defence (2021-2025), Markéta Sluková, the Czech volleyball player, Martin Půta, the former Czech Member of Parliament and Tomáš Drahoňovský, the Czech news reporter.
