= Chilean Journal of Statistics =

- Discipline: Statistics
- Language: English
- Edited by: Ronny Vallejos

Publication details
- Former name(s): La Revista de la Sociedad Chilena de Estadística
- History: 1984–present
- Publisher: Sociedad Chilena de Estadística (Chile)
- Frequency: Biannually
- Open access: Yes

Standard abbreviations
- ISO 4: Chil. J. Stat.

Indexing
- ISSN: 0718-7920

Links
- Journal homepage

The Chilean Journal of Statistics is a biannual peer-reviewed scientific journal of statistics. It is published by the Chilean Statistical Society. The journal was established in 1984 as La Revista de la Sociedad Chilena de Estadística and obtained its current title in 2010.

== Abstracting and indexing ==
The Chilean Journal of Statistics is indexed in MathSciNet, Zentralblatt MATH, and Latindex.
