= Swiss Journal of Sociology =

Academic journal

- Discipline: Sociology
- Language: English; French; German

Publication details
- History: 1975-present
- Publisher: Seismo Press on behalf of the Swiss Sociological Association
- Frequency: Triannual
- Open access: Yes
- License: CC BY-NC-ND 4.0

Standard abbreviations
- ISO 4: Swiss J. Sociol.
- NLM: Schweiz Z Soziol

Indexing
- ISSN: 0379-3664 (print); 2297-8348 (web)
- LCCN: 2017208182
- OCLC no.: 645480674

Links
- Journal homepage; Online Archive

The Swiss Journal of Sociology is an open access peer-reviewed academic journal of sociology, published by Seismo Press on behalf of the Swiss Sociological Association and funded by the Swiss Academy of Sciences. It is considered platinum open access.

== Abstracting and indexing ==
The journal is abstracted and indexed in:

- Directory of Open Access Journals
- EBSCO databases
- IBZ Online
- Scopus
