= Per Linguam =

- Discipline: Linguistics, education
- Language: English
- Edited by: Christa van der Walt

Publication details
- History: 1985–present
- Publisher: Stellenbosch University (South Africa)
- Frequency: Biannually

Standard abbreviations
- ISO 4: Per Linguam

Indexing
- ISSN: 0259-2312
- LCCN: 2004203435
- OCLC no.: 263445662

Links
- Journal homepage

Per Linguam is a peer-reviewed academic journal published by Stellenbosch University. It covers topics related to language learning and applied language studies and has more recently started including a focus on multilingualism and educational psychology. The issue of multilingualism, in particular, has been identified as an important issue in South Africa.

== History ==
Per Linguam was established in 1985. The current editor-in-chief is Christa van der Walt.

== See also ==
- Language education
