= EPortuguêse =

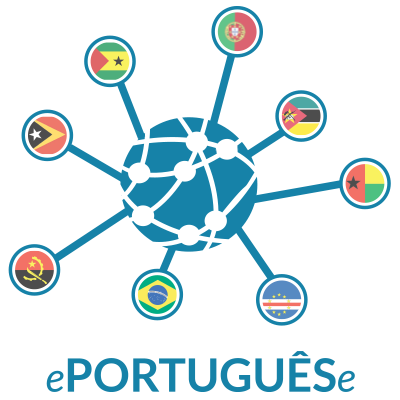
The ePORTUGUÊSe logo

The ePORTUGUÊSe network is a platform developed by the World Health Organization (WHO) to strengthen collaboration among Portuguese-speaking countries in the areas of health information and capacity building of Human Resources for Health, therefore enhancing health information systems in those countries.

According to Ethnologue, Portuguese is the sixth most spoken language in the world and there are more than 300 million speakers distributed through eight countries (Angola, Brazil, Cape Verde, Guinea-Bissau, Mozambique, Portugal, São Tomé and Príncipe, and Timor-Leste) in four WHO Regional Offices (AFRO , PAHO-AMRO , EURO and SEARO ). Portuguese is also the third most spoken language in the Western hemisphere and the most widely spoken in the southern hemisphere.

In November 2012, ePORTUGUÊSe received a recognition award for its contribution to the South-South and Triangular collaboration at the UN High Level and Directors General Meeting during the Global Development EXPO 2012 held in Vienna, Austria.

In May 2015, the ePORTUGUÊSe network ceased to exist as a WHO Programme.

== History ==
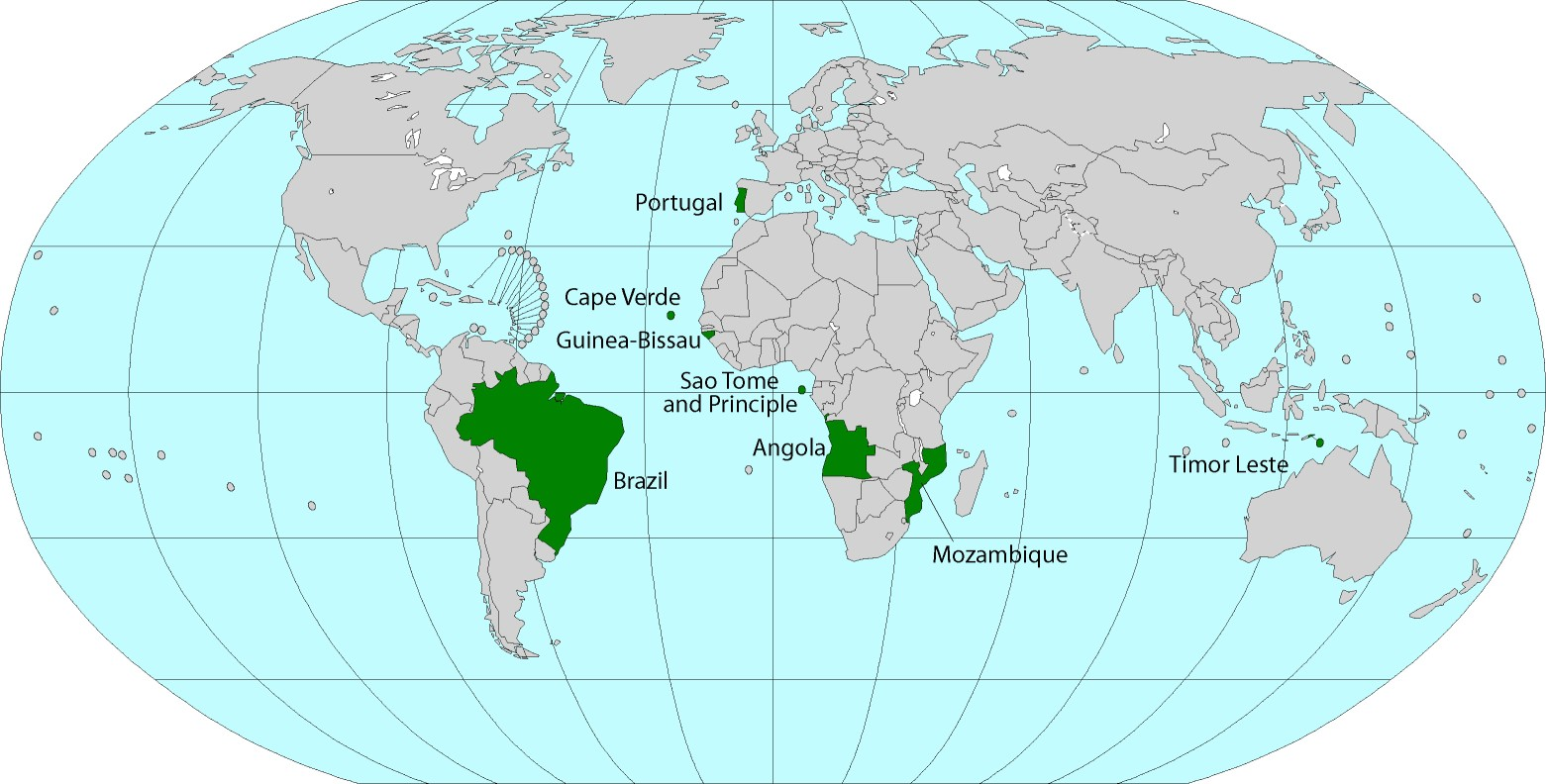
Portuguese-speaking countries

- The ePORTUGUÊSe network was established in 2005, after the Ministerial Summit on Health Research held in Mexico City in November 2004. At this event, topics such as digital inclusion and the know-do gap were debated and WHO made a pledge to create health information networks in various languages as a way to contribute to the discussed challenge,.
- In April 2005 the ePORTUGUÊSe network was established, with the mission to develop a Portuguese health information network and strengthen the cooperation and knowledge exchange between the eight Portuguese speaking countries and WHO.
- Since its establishment, the ePORTUGUÊSe network has been working as a facilitator by establishing alliances with health institutions from different countries. Its main purpose is to disseminate and distribute information in Portuguese, thereby reducing existing language barriers. By using diverse media resources, ePORTUGUÊSe facilitates the access to relevant and up-to-date information that contribute to the work of health professionals in rural and distant areas can be facilitated.
- Brazil is now one of the main partners in south-south cooperation. Working together with Portugal, it has developed the Health Cooperation Strategic Plan (PECS/CPLC) for the eight Portuguese-speaking countries (CPLC), signed by the health ministers of those countries in an official ceremony in Estoril, Portugal, in May 2008.
- In January 2010, WHO and CPLC signed a cooperation agreement highlighting the commitment to use the ePORTUGUÊSe network, to encourage training and the strengthening of health information systems, particularly in underdeveloped countries.
- The ePORTUGUÊSe network provides support to Portuguese-speaking countries so that they can reach their Millennium Development Goals.

== Activities ==
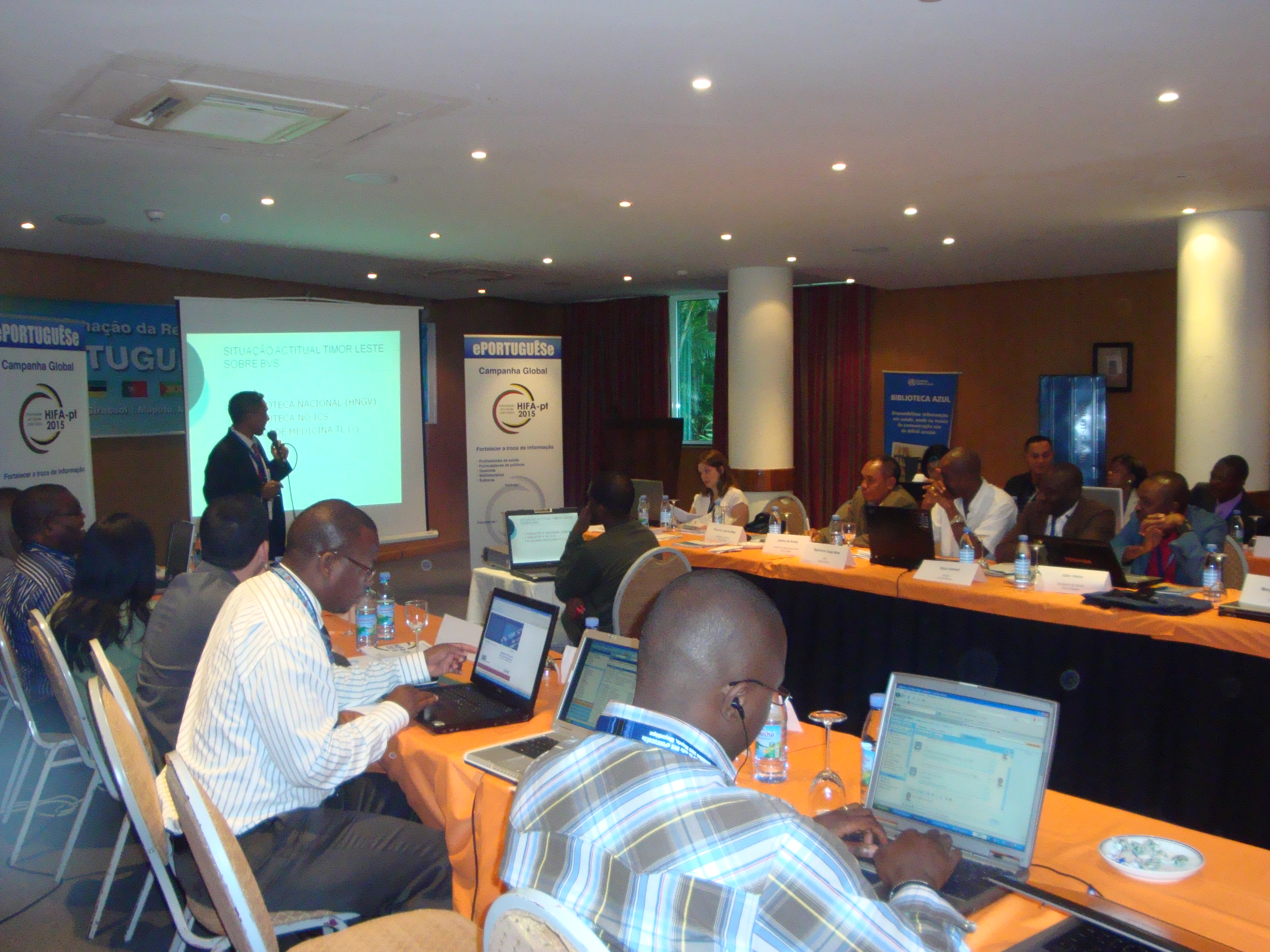
VHL capacity training

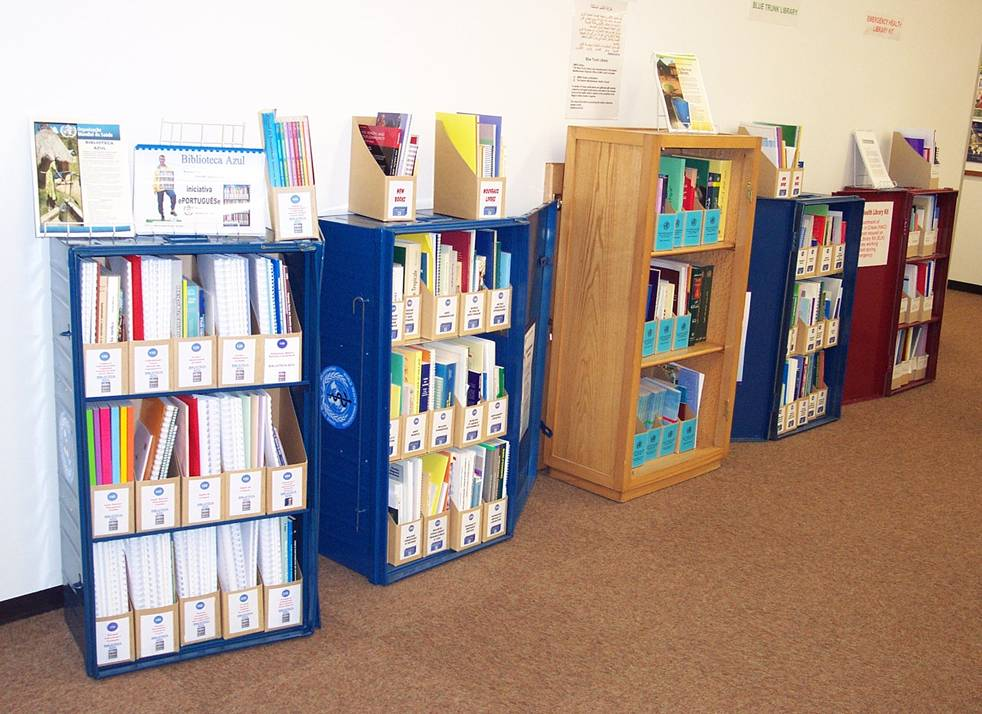
Blue trunk libraries

- Promoting and improving access to health information available in Portuguese, by developing a Virtual Health Library based on a model created by the Latin American and Caribbean Center on Health Sciences Information (BIREME/PAHO/WHO), a specialized center of the Pan American Health Organization/World Health Organization,;
- Supporting and promoting local research in Portuguese;
- Delivering health Information in Portuguese through a compact library called – Blue Trunk Library to be distributed to rural and distant areas;
- Using information in science and technology (ICT) to build capacity of Human Resources for Health;
- Developing platforms in different social media, collaborative space, blogs and discussion groups;
- Encouraging training in the HINARI programme (Access to Research in Health Programme);
- Strengthening HIFA-pt (Health Information for all in Portuguese) based on HIFA2015 (Health information for all by 2015)– a discussion group with nearly 7000 members from 150 countries that aims to collect tacit knowledge and facilitate the exchange of experiences. HIFA-pt was developed by the ePORTUGUÊSe network in collaboration with the Global Healthcare Information Network.

== Structure ==
The ePORTUGUÊSe network is part of the Knowledge Management and Sharing Department of the World Health Organization (WHO) in Geneva. The ePORTUGUÊSe network has focal points in every country that work together to support the dissemination of health information. The coordinator of the ePORTUGUÊSe Network is Dr Regina Ungerer.

== Members ==
The members of the ePORTUGUÊSe network are: health and information professionals from the eight Portuguese-speaking countries: Angola, Brazil, Cape Verde, Guinea-Bissau, Mozambique, Portugal, São Tomé and Príncipe, and Timor-Leste, as well as anyone with an interest in supporting these countries.
