= Plant Ecology and Evolution =

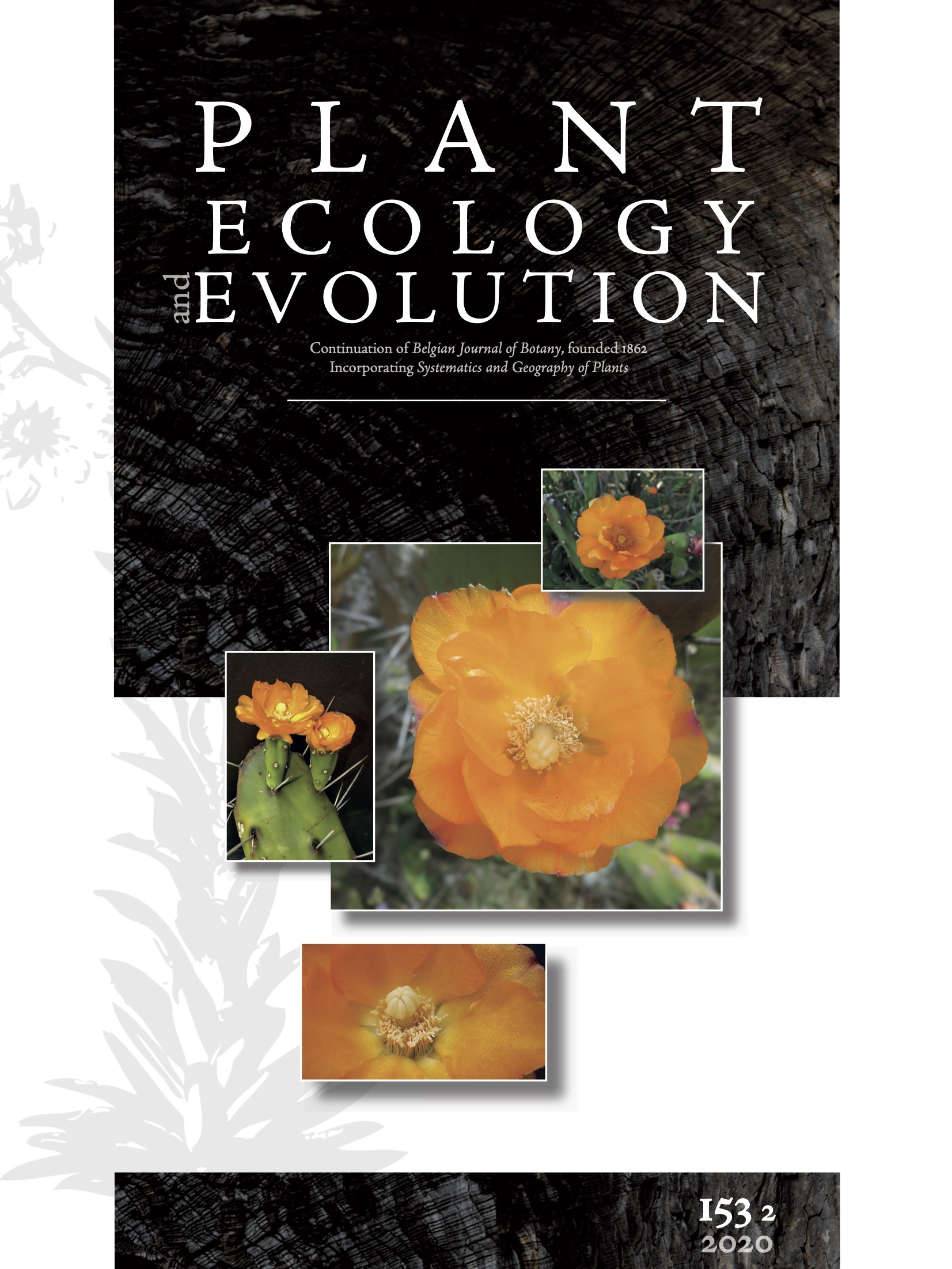
- Discipline: Botany, systematics, ecology
- Language: English, French
- Edited by: Brecht Verstraete

Publication details
- Former names: Belgian Journal of Botany, Systematics and Geography of Plants
- History: 1862-present
- Publisher: Meise Botanic Garden and Royal Botanical Society of Belgium (Belgium)
- Frequency: Triannual
- Open access: Yes
- License: CC BY 4.0
- Impact factor: 1.3 (2024)

Standard abbreviations
- ISO 4: Plant Ecol. Evol.

Indexing
- ISSN: 2032-3913 (print); 2032-3921 (web)
- JSTOR: 20323913
- OCLC no.: 874445475

Links
- Journal homepage

Plant Ecology and Evolution is a triannual peer-reviewed open access scientific journal covering ecology, phylogenetics, and systematics of plants (including algae, fungi, and slime molds), including related fields such as comparative and developmental morphology, conservation biology, evolution, phytogeography, reproductive biology, population genetics, and vegetation studies. Although the geographic scope is global, it particularly publishes about botany in (sub)tropical Africa.

The publication of the journal is diamond open access, supported by two non-profit organisations: Meise Botanic Garden and the Royal Botanical Society of Belgium.

== Journal history ==
The journal was established in 2010 as a merger of Belgian Journal of Botany and Systematics and Geography of Plants. The two publishers of these journals, the Royal Botanical Society of Belgium and Meise Botanic Garden, have decided to publish Plant Ecology and Evolution together as co-publishers, therefore ensuring its independence from commercial publishers. This merger was prompted by the fact that both journals started to attract a more international audience and because their scope started to largely overlap. Both journals had a focus on tropical African botany and Belgian Journal of Botany gradually changed from a journal of general botany to a journal of field botany. The first editor in chief of Plant Ecology and Evolution was Elmar Robbrecht (2010–2020), who was also editor in chief of Systematics and Geography of Plants. The current editor in chief is Brecht Verstraete (2020–).

=== Belgian Journal of Botany and former titles ===
The journal started as Bulletins de la Société royale de Botanique de Belgique in 1862, the same year as the foundation of the Royal Botanical Society of Belgium, and was meant as a publication for the members of the society. It originally published a mix of matters related to the society (bylaws, member lists, minutes of meetings, etc.) and scientific contributions, mainly from Belgian members. The international reach of the journal gradually grew during the 20th century, leading to the decision to change the title to Belgian Journal of Botany in 1990. For the first decades of the Bulletin’s existence, it was not always clear who was responsible for the editorial work. The first clearly mentioned editors ("secrétaire des publications") were François Crépin (vols 6–13, 1867–1874) and Alfred Cogniaux (vol. 14, 1875 & vols 51–53, 1910–1914). The special volume 50 (1909) was published by Jean Chalon. Editorship is fully clear from 1949 onwards, when the journal was managed by André Lawalrée (1949–1969), Pierre Compère (1970–2002), and Olivier Raspé (2003–2009).

==== Title history ====
- Volumes 1–5 (1862–1866): Bulletins de la Société royale de Botanique de Belgique
- Volumes 6–113 (1867–1980): Bulletin de la Société royale de Botanique de Belgique
- Volumes 114–122 (1981–1989): Bulletin de la Société royale de Botanique de Belgique / Bulletin van de Koninklijke Belgische Botanische Vereniging
- Volumes 123–142 (1990–2009): Belgian Journal of Botany
- Volumes 143– (2010–): Plant Ecology and Evolution

=== Systematics and Geography of Plants and former titles ===
In 1902, on the initiative of Théophile Durand, the Jardin botanique de l’État in Brussels started publishing a bulletin containing miscellaneous information about the research at garden. The Bulletin du Jardin Botanique de l’État à Bruxelles was continued by Émile De Wildeman, Walter Robyns, Fernand Demaret, Roland Tournay (1967–1972), André Robyns (1973–1998), and Elmar Robbrecht (1999–2009). During the course of the 20th century, it developed into an international journal devoted to the systematics of all plants and fungi, but also covering related fields such as phytogeography, evolution, comparative morphology, pollen and spores, and vegetation studies. A complete overview of the history of the journal was published in the 100 year anniversary issue.

==== Title history ====
- Volumes 1–5 (1902–1919): Bulletin du Jardin Botanique de l’État à Bruxelles
- Volumes 6–14 (1919–1937): Bulletin du Jardin Botanique de l’État (Bruxelles)
- Volumes 15–36 (1938–1966): Bulletin du Jardin Botanique de l’État (Bruxelles) / Bulletin van de Rijksplantentuin (Brussel)
- Volumes 37–67 (1967–1998): Bulletin du Jardin Botanique National de Belgique / Bulletin van de Nationale Plantentuin van België
- Volumes 68–79 (1999–2009): Systematics and Geography of Plants
