= PLOS Pathogens =

- Discipline: Biology
- Language: English
- Edited by: Sumita Bhaduri-McIntosh, and Michael Malim

Publication details
- History: 2005-present
- Publisher: Public Library of Science
- Frequency: Weekly
- Open access: Yes
- License: Creative Commons Attribution License
- Impact factor: 4.9 (2024)

Standard abbreviations
- ISO 4: PLOS Pathog.

Indexing
- ISSN: 1553-7366 (print); 1553-7374 (web)
- LCCN: 2004216476
- OCLC no.: 57176478

Links
- Journal homepage; Online access; Online archive

PLOS Pathogens is a peer-reviewed open-access medical journal. All content in PLOS Pathogens is published under the Creative Commons "by-attribution" license.

PLOS Pathogens began operation in September 2005. It was the fifth journal of the Public Library of Science (PLOS), a non-profit open-access publisher.

== Journal ==
=== Scope ===
The journal scope of PLOS Pathogens is to feature PLOS Pathogens publishes original research and commentary that significantly advance the understanding of pathogens and how they interact with their host organisms.

Topics include (but are not limited to) adaptive and innate immune defenses as well as pathogen countermeasures, emerging pathogens, evolution, genomics and gene regulation, model host organisms, pathogen-cell biology, pathogenesis, prions, proteomics and signal transduction, rational vaccine design, structural biology, and virulence factors.

=== Content ===
PLOS Pathogens publishes primary research articles, Pearls, Research Matters, Reviews, Opinions and occasional Editorials.

=== Metrics ===
PLOS supports DORA – the San Francisco Declaration on Research Assessment and uses Article-Level Metrics (ALMs) to measure the impact of articles based on their merits rather than using the journal impact factor. Traditionally, the impact of research articles has been measured by the publication journal, but this particular view examines the overall performance and reach of the articles themselves. ALMs are noted on each article to mark how often they are viewed, cited, saved, discussed/shared or recommended in order to assess work at the article level.

ALMs are available, upon publication, for every article published by PLOS.

=== Abstracting and Indexing ===
PLOS Pathogens is indexed in PubMed, MEDLINE, Chemical Abstracts Service (CAS), EMBASE, EMBASE, SCOPUS, Zoological Record, and Web of Science.

== Open Access ==
PLOS Pathogens publishes under the Open Access license PLOS applies to all its published works, the Creative Commons Attribution license (CC BY).

== PLOS Pathogens Business Model ==
PLOS's business model requires in most cases that authors pay publication fees. PLOS provides individual and institutional fee support programs through its Global Participation Initiatives, Publication Fee Assistance and Institutional Fee Support.

== Measures of Impact ==
PLOS Pathogens uses Article-Level Metrics (ALMs) to measure the influence of articles based on their individual merits rather than using the journal impact factor. A signpost in the upper right of every article provides summary metrics of citations, views, shares and bookmarks.
