= BMC Medicine =

- Discipline: Medicine
- Language: English
- Edited by: Lin Lee

Publication details
- History: 2003–present
- Publisher: BioMed Central
- Open access: Yes
- License: CC-BY-4.0
- Impact factor: 8.7 (2025)

Standard abbreviations
- ISO 4: BMC Med.

Indexing
- ISSN: 1741-7015
- LCCN: 2004243044
- OCLC no.: 53806969

Links
- Journal homepage; Online archive

BMC Medicine is a peer-reviewed open access medical journal published since 2003 by BioMed Central.

The journal is abstracted and indexed in Chemical Abstracts Service, BIOSIS Previews, Embase, MEDLINE, Science Citation Index Expanded, and Scopus. According to the Journal Citation Reports, the journal has a 2025 impact factor of 8.7.
