= Aracne =

Italian academic publisher

- Status: failed
- Founded: 1993
- Founder: Gioacchino Onorati
- Defunct: 2018
- Country of origin: Italy
- Headquarters location: Rome
- Fiction genres: academic, scientific
- Official website: www.aracne-editrice.it

Aracne was an Italian publishing company, founded in 1993 by Gioacchino Onorati and specialized in academic and scientific literature. It was declared failed on 6 April 2018.

It is the only Italian publishing company that does not require exclusive rights for its publications. Aracne publishes both paper books and ebooks, most of them in Italian, although a considerable number of works is published in English. It claimed to use the peer review as an evaluation system, it has often been found to use vanity press systems, and to publish on ordination.

Aracne was a member of the programme for the Evaluation of the Quality of Research of the ANVUR, institution of the Italian Ministry of Education, Universities and Research.

== Reinhold Baer Prize ==
The Reinhold Baer Prize is an annual mathematics award granted jointly by the non-profit associations AGTA (Advances in Group Theory and Applications) and Aracne for outstanding PhD theses or research articles in group theory and its applications. The award is named after the German algebraist Reinhold Baer.

The laureate is presented with a prize of 1,000 €.

The first premiere took place during the international conference Advances in Group Theory and Applications 2017, held in Lecce from September 5 to 8, 2017.

=== Laureates ===
Year	Laureate(s)		Image	Citizenship(s)	Institution(s)^{[a]}	Title of awarded thesis or article
2017	Urban Jezernik	Winner		Slovenia	University of Ljubljana	Universal Commutator Relations
2017	Carolina Vallejo Rodriguez	Special Mention		Spain	University of Valencia	Characters, correspondences and fields of values of finite groups
2018	Gareth Tracey	Winner		Ireland	University of Warwick	Minimal generation of transitive permutation groups
2018	Geoffrey Janssens	Special Mention		Belgium	Vrije Universiteit Brussel	Identities of Affine Algebras and their Asymptotic Behaviour
2019	Not assigned					
2020	Florian Eisele	Winner (ex aequo)		Germany	City University of London	A counterexample to the first Zassenhaus conjecture
2020	Leo Margolis	Winner (ex aequo)		Germany/Russia	Vrije Universiteit Brussel	A counterexample to the first Zassenhaus conjecture
2020	Hangyang Meng	Special Mention		China	Universitat de Valencia	Regular orbits of actions of finite soluble groups
2022	Iker de las Heras	Winner		Basque Country	University of the Basque Country	Some topics on finite p-groups and pro-p groups
2022	Sam Hughes	Special Mention		United Kingdom	University of Southampton	Equivariant cohomology, lattices, and trees
2024	Scott Harper	Winner		United Kingdom	University of St Andrews	The maximal size of a minimal generating set
2024	Jan Moritz Petschick	Special Mention		Germany	Heinrich Heine University Düsseldorf	Groups acting on rooted trees, the generalised Magnus property and zeta functions of groups

^{a} Institutions mentioned above refer to the institutions where the laureates obtained their PhD.
