= Open Access Journal of Medicinal and Aromatic Plants =

- Language: English

Publication details
- History: 2010–present
- Publisher: Medicinal and Aromatic Plants Association of India (India)
- Frequency: Biannually
- Open access: Yes
- License: Creative Commons Attribution 4.0 International License

Standard abbreviations
- ISO 4: Open Access J. Med. Aromat. Plants

Indexing
- CODEN: OAJMAX
- ISSN: 0974-7877
- OCLC no.: 859394415

Links
- Journal homepage; Online access; Online archive; Journal page at society website

The Open Access Journal of Medicinal and Aromatic Plants is a biannual peer-reviewed open-access medical journal published by the Medicinal and Aromatic Plants Association of India. The journal was established in 2010 and covers all aspects of medicinal and aromatic plants. The present editor-in-chief is Manivel Ponnuchamy, Director (Acting), Directorate of Medicinal and Aromatic Plants Research, Anand

== Scope of the Journal ==
It aims to publish scientific articles related to medicinal and aromatic plants (MAPs) on the aspects like botany, taxonomy, ecology, crop husbandry, crop protection, genetic improvement including molecular genetics, plant physiology, plant biochemistry (including plant organic chemistry), plant microbiology, and related areas but not pharmacology or pharmacognosy.

== Journal policies ==
Preprints Policy: The journal has a policy for archiving or sharing preprints. As per its policy, the authors are permitted to post their work online prior to and during the submission process.

Open Access Policy: Journal had adopted a policy to provided immediate open access to all its content published.

Copyright Policy: The authors of the articles published in the journal retain copyright and grant the journal right of first publication licensed under a Creative Commons Attribution CC BY 4.0

== Abstracting and indexing ==
The journal is abstracted and indexed in:

- Chemical Abstracts Service
- CAB International
- Directory of Open Access scholarly Resources (ROAD)
- SCImago Journal Rank
