= Central European Journal of International and Security Studies =

Academic journal

- Discipline: International relations, political science
- Language: English
- Edited by: Aleš Karmazin

Publication details
- History: 2007–present
- Publisher: Metropolitan University Prague Press (Czech Republic)
- Frequency: Quarterly
- Open access: Yes

Standard abbreviations
- ISO 4: Cent. Eur. J. Int. Secur. Stud.

Indexing
- ISSN: 1802-548X
- OCLC no.: 320691443

Links
- Journal homepage; Online archive

The Central European Journal of International and Security Studies is a quarterly peer-reviewed academic journal that addresses theoretical and empirical issues in the fields of international relations and security studies. The editor-in-chief is Aleš Karmazin.

== Overview ==
The journal was established in 2007 and is published by the Department of International Relations and European Studies at Metropolitan University Prague. It covers political theory, political economy, organisations, and area studies related to European politics, as well as international relations and global security. The journal is made available on a complimentary basis to interested parties in the international security community. Currently, the journal is published in both hard copy and an open access digital format.

The journal's content includes research articles, commentary pieces, book reviews, and a Global War on Terrorism Testimonials forum. In addition, the journal's website includes international relations-related podcasts, columns, and a series of articles available exclusively on the internet.

== Abstracting and Indexing ==
The journal is abstracted and indexed in Scopus, the Directory of Open Access Journals, and EBSCO databases.
