= Münster Journal of Mathematics =

- Discipline: Mathematics
- Language: German, English
- Edited by: Linus Kramer

Publication details
- Former name(s): Schriftenreihe des Mathematischen Institutes Münster
- History: 1948-present
- Publisher: Mathematisches Institut der Universität Münster (Germany)
- Open access: Yes

Standard abbreviations
- ISO 4: Münst. J. Math.
- MathSciNet: Munster J. Math.

Indexing
- ISSN: 1867-5778 (print); 1867-5786 (web)
- OCLC no.: 302285542

Links
- Journal homepage; Online access

The Münster Journal of Mathematics is a peer-reviewed mathematics journal covering research in all fields of pure and applied mathematics. It is published by the Mathematical Institutes of the University of Münster. It was established in 1948 as the Schriftenreihe des Mathematischen Institutes Münster by Heinrich Behnke and continued by Reinhold Remmert, G. Maltese and Christopher Deninger. The journal obtained its current title in 2008 with volume numbering restarted at 1. The current editor-in-chief is Linus Kramer.

The journal appears both in print and electronically. Free full-text PDF versions of all articles are available on-line. According to the Mathematical Reviews, the journal has a Mathematical Citation Quotient for 2012 of 0.88.
