= PLOS Biology =

Monthly peer-reviewed scientific journal

- Discipline: Biology
- Language: English
- Edited by: Nonia Pariente

Publication details
- History: 2003–present
- Publisher: Public Library of Science
- Frequency: Monthly
- Open access: Yes
- License: Creative Commons Attribution License
- Impact factor: 6.9 (2025)

Standard abbreviations
- ISO 4: PLOS Biol.

Indexing
- CODEN: PBLIBG
- ISSN: 1544-9173 (print); 1545-7885 (web)
- LCCN: 2003212293
- OCLC no.: 1039259630

Links
- Journal homepage; Online access; Online archive

PLOS Biology is a monthly peer-reviewed scientific journal covering all aspects of biology. Publication began on October 13, 2003. It is the first journal published by the Public Library of Science. The editor-in-chief is Nonia Pariente.

In addition to research articles, the journal publishes magazine content aimed to be accessible to a broad audience. Article types in this section are essays, "unsolved mysteries", editorials, and synopses.

== Abstracting and indexing ==
The journal is abstracted and indexed in:

- Biological Abstracts
- BIOSIS Previews
- Current Contents/Agriculture, Biology & Environmental Sciences
- Current Contents/Life Sciences
- Chemical Abstracts Service
- Embase
- Index Medicus/MEDLINE/PubMed
- Science Citation Index
- Scopus
- The Zoological Record

According to Journal Citation Reports, the journal had a 2025 impact factor of 6.9. The journal does not list this impact factor on its website. Instead, the journal promotes the use of article level metrics to provide a measure of the impact of their published articles.
