= Paladyn =

- Discipline: Robotics
- Language: English
- Edited by: Gregor Schöner

Publication details
- History: 2010-present
- Publisher: Walter de Gruyter
- Frequency: Continuous
- Open access: Yes
- License: CC-BY-NC-ND

Standard abbreviations
- ISO 4: Paladyn

Indexing
- ISSN: 2080-9778 (print); 2081-4836 (web)
- LCCN: 2015207043
- OCLC no.: 954222404

Links
- Journal homepage

Paladyn, Journal of Behavioral Robotics, is a peer-reviewed open-access scientific journal covering topics broadly related to neuronally and psychologically inspired robots and other behaving autonomous systems. It was established in 2010 and is published by Walter de Gruyter. The editor-in-chief is Gregor Schöner (Ruhr University Bochum).

== Abstracting and indexing ==
The journal is abstracted and indexed in:

- EBSCO databases
- Inspec
- ProQuest databases
- Scopus
