= BMC Systems Biology =

- Discipline: Systems biology
- Language: English

Publication details
- History: 2007–2019
- Publisher: BioMed Central
- Frequency: Upon publication
- Open access: Yes
- Impact factor: 2.048 (2018)

Standard abbreviations
- ISO 4: BMC Syst. Biol.

Indexing
- ISSN: 1752-0509
- OCLC no.: 76922333

Links
- Journal homepage

BMC Systems Biology was an open access peer-reviewed scientific journal that covered research in systems biology. Filling a gap in what was a new research field, the journal was established in 2007 and is published by BioMed Central. Part of the BMC Series of journals, it had a broad scope covering the engineering of biological systems, network modelling, quantitative analyses, integration of different levels of information and synthetic biology.

In January 2019, the Editorial Board was informed that the journal was closing and no more submissions would be accepted after March 1. The last articles were published on 5 April 2019, but content is still archived in perpetuity from the homepage and PubMed Central.

== Scope and Coverage ==
BMC Systems Biology focused on a wide range of topics within systems biology, including but not limited to:

- Engineering of biological systems
- Network modelling
- Quantitative analyses
- Integration of different levels of information
- Synthetic biology

The journal provided a platform for the dissemination of significant research findings in the area of systems biology, aiming to bridge the gap between biological research and mathematical modelling.

== Notable Articles and Research ==
Several significant studies were published in the journal, contributing to the advancement of systems biology. Some notable research includes:

- "A quantitative systems pharmacology (QSP) model for Pneumocystis treatment in mice"
- "Network-based characterization of drug-protein interaction signatures with a space-efficient approach"
- "Boolean network modeling of β-cell apoptosis and insulin resistance in type 2 diabetes mellitus"

== Impact and Legacy ==
The journal's impact factor in 2018 was 2.048, reflecting its influence and relevance in the field of systems biology. Although the journal is now closed, its archived content continues to serve as a valuable resource for researchers and scholars.

== See also ==
- Systems and Synthetic Biology (until 2015)
