= Journal of Diabetes =

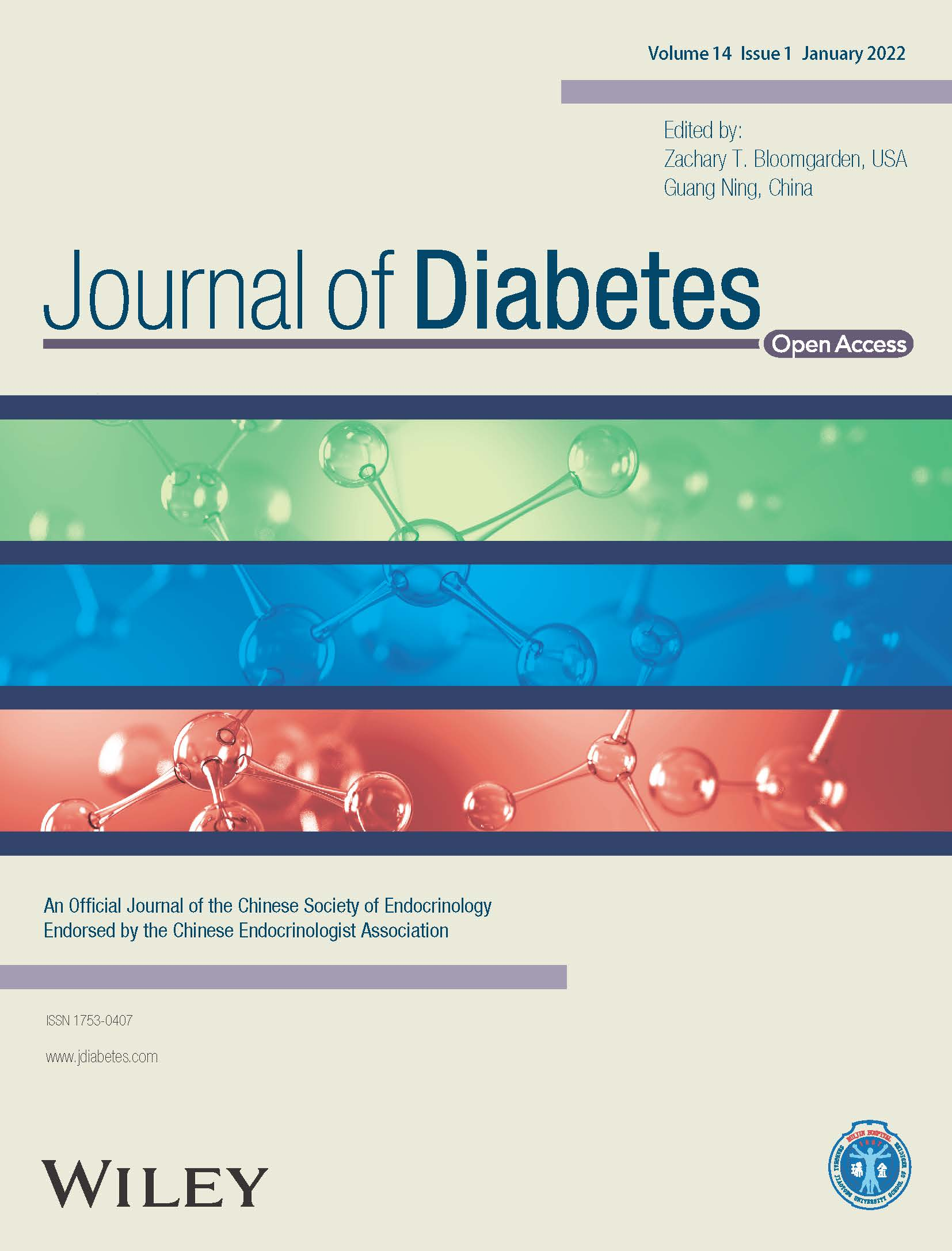
- Discipline: Diabetology, endocrinology, metabolism
- Language: English
- Edited by: Zachary T. Bloomgarden, Guang Ning

Publication details
- History: 2009-present
- Publisher: Wiley
- Frequency: Monthly
- Open access: Yes
- License: CC BY
- Impact factor: 3.0 (2023)

Standard abbreviations
- ISO 4: J. Diabetes

Indexing
- CODEN: JDOIAC
- ISSN: 1753-0393 (print); 1753-0407 (web)
- LCCN: 2009205669
- OCLC no.: 699238955

Links
- Journal homepage; Online access; Online archive

The Journal of Diabetes is a monthly peer-reviewed medical journal that covers research, therapeutics, and education in the field of diabetes mellitus. It is published by Wiley and is an official journal of the Chinese Society of Endocrinology and endorsed by the Chinese Endocrinologist Association.

== History ==
The journal was established in 2009 and changed to an open access publishing model in 2022. The printed version was discontinued in 2017. The editors-in-chief are Zachary T. Bloomgarden and Guang Ning.

== Abstracting and indexing ==
The journal is abstracted and indexed in:

- CAB Abstracts
- Current Contents/Clinical Medicine
- Directory of Open Access Journals
- EBSCO databases
- Embase
- Food Science and Technology Abstracts
- Index Medicus/MEDLINE/PubMed
- ProQuest databases
- Science Citation Index Expanded
- Scopus

According to the Journal Citation Reports, the journal has a 2023 impact factor of 3.0.

The journal reports to have an acceptance rate of 9%.
