= Cytometry Part A =

- Discipline: Cytometry, medical imaging, cytology, histology
- Language: English
- Edited by: Bartek Rajwa

Publication details
- Former name: Cytometry
- Publisher: John Wiley & Sons
- Frequency: Monthly
- Open access: Hybrid
- Impact factor: 4.355 (2020)

Standard abbreviations
- ISO 4: Cytom. A

Indexing
- CODEN: CYTODQ
- ISSN: 1552-4922 (print); 1552-4930 (web)
- LCCN: 2004212580
- OCLC no.: 52508910

Links
- Journal homepage; Online archive

Cytometry Part A is a peer-reviewed scientific journal covering all aspects of the study of cytometry that was established in 1980. It is the official journal of the International Society for Advancement of Cytometry.

Cytometry Part A focuses on molecular analysis of cellular systems as well as cell-based spectroscopic analyses and associated bioinformatics/computational methodologies.

Brian Mayall was the journal's founding editor-in-chief until 1998. Jan Visser and Charles Goolsby subsequently succeeded Brian Mayall in this position. Attila Tarnok has served as the Journal's editor-in-chief from 2007 to 2024. In 2024 it was announced that Bartek Rajwa will be taking over as editor-in-chief

This journal was formerly known as Cytometry and first published in July 1980 with ISSN 0196-4763. It has been published with ISSN 1552-4922 since 2003. Cytometry Part A is associated with Cytometry Part B, ISSN 1552-4930.

The journal is abstracted and indexed in:

- BIOSIS Previews
- Current Contents
- MEDLINE/PubMed
- Science Citation Index Expanded
- Scopus

According to the Journal Citation Reports, the journal has a 2020 impact factor of 4.355.
