= Caucasian Review of International Affairs =

Academic journal

- Discipline: International relations
- Language: English

Publication details
- Former name: Caucasian Journal of European Affairs
- History: 2006–2010
- Publisher: Caucasian Review of International Affairs
- Frequency: Quarterly

Standard abbreviations
- ISO 4: Cauc. Rev. Int. Aff.

Indexing
- ISSN: 1865-6773

Links
- Journal homepage

Caucasian Review of International Affairs was a quarterly peer-reviewed online academic journal covering the countries of the Caucasus and the issues of contemporary international relations. It was established in 2006 as the Caucasian Journal of European Affairs, discontinued in 2010.

The journal published research papers, comments, book reviews, and interviews, as well as a weekly analytical piece, the Caucasus Update.

== Abstracting and Indexing ==
The journal was abstracted and indexed in Columbia International Affairs Online, ProQuest, EBSCOhost, International Relations and Security Network, World Affairs Online, Virtuelle Fachbibliothek Osteuropa, Global Development Network, and Social Sciences Eastern Europe.
