= Nature Environment and Pollution Technology =

- Discipline: Environmental Science, Ecology, Pollution
- Language: English, English
- Edited by: P.K. Goel

Publication details
- History: 2002–present
- Publisher: Technoscience Publication (India)
- Frequency: Quarterly
- Open access: Yes

Standard abbreviations
- ISO 4: Nat. Environ. Pollut. Technol.

Indexing
- ISSN: 0972-6268 (print); 2395-3454 (web)
- LCCN: 2006413899
- OCLC no.: 1054394377

Links
- Journal homepage; Submit Manuscript

Nature Environment and Pollution Technology is an open access, peer-reviewed scientific journal of environmental science. It is published quarterly by Technoscience Publications and was established in 2002. The journal is indexed in Scopus, ProQuest, Chemical Abstracts (CAS), EBSCO,
