= Advances in Distributed Computing and Artificial Intelligence Journal =

- Discipline: Artificial intelligence, distributed computing
- Language: English
- Edited by: Juan M. Corchado, Sigeru Omatu

Publication details
- History: 2012–present
- Publisher: Ediciones Universidad de Salamanca (Spain)
- Frequency: Continuous
- Open access: Yes
- License: CC BY
- Impact factor: 1.7 (2023)

Standard abbreviations
- ISO 4: Adv. Distrib. Comput. Artif. Intell. J.

Indexing
- ISSN: 2255-2863 (print); 2255-2863 (web)
- OCLC no.: 862779541

Links
- Journal homepage; Online access to volumes; Guidelines for authors

Advances in Distributed Computing and Artificial Intelligence Journal is a peer-reviewed scientific journal covering the fields of artificial intelligence and distributed computing and applying these techniques in areas like machine learning, electronic commerce, generative AI, the Internet of Things, smart grids, etc.

The journal is published by the Ediciones Universidad de Salamanca, a subsidiary of the University of Salamanca and follows a diamond open access publishing model.

== History ==
The journal was established in 2012 by the University of Salamanca. The frequency of issues was initially quarterly, but the journal changed to publication in continuous mode in 2023. The editors-in-chief are Juan M. Corchado (University of Salamanca) and Sigeru Omatu (Hiroshima University).

== Abstracting and indexing ==
The journal is abstracted and indexed in:

- Directory of Open Access Journals
- ProQuest databases
- Sherpa ROMEO
- Emerging Sources Citation Index

According to the Journal Citation Reports, the journal has a 2023 impact factor of 1.7.
