= Elizabeth Marincola =

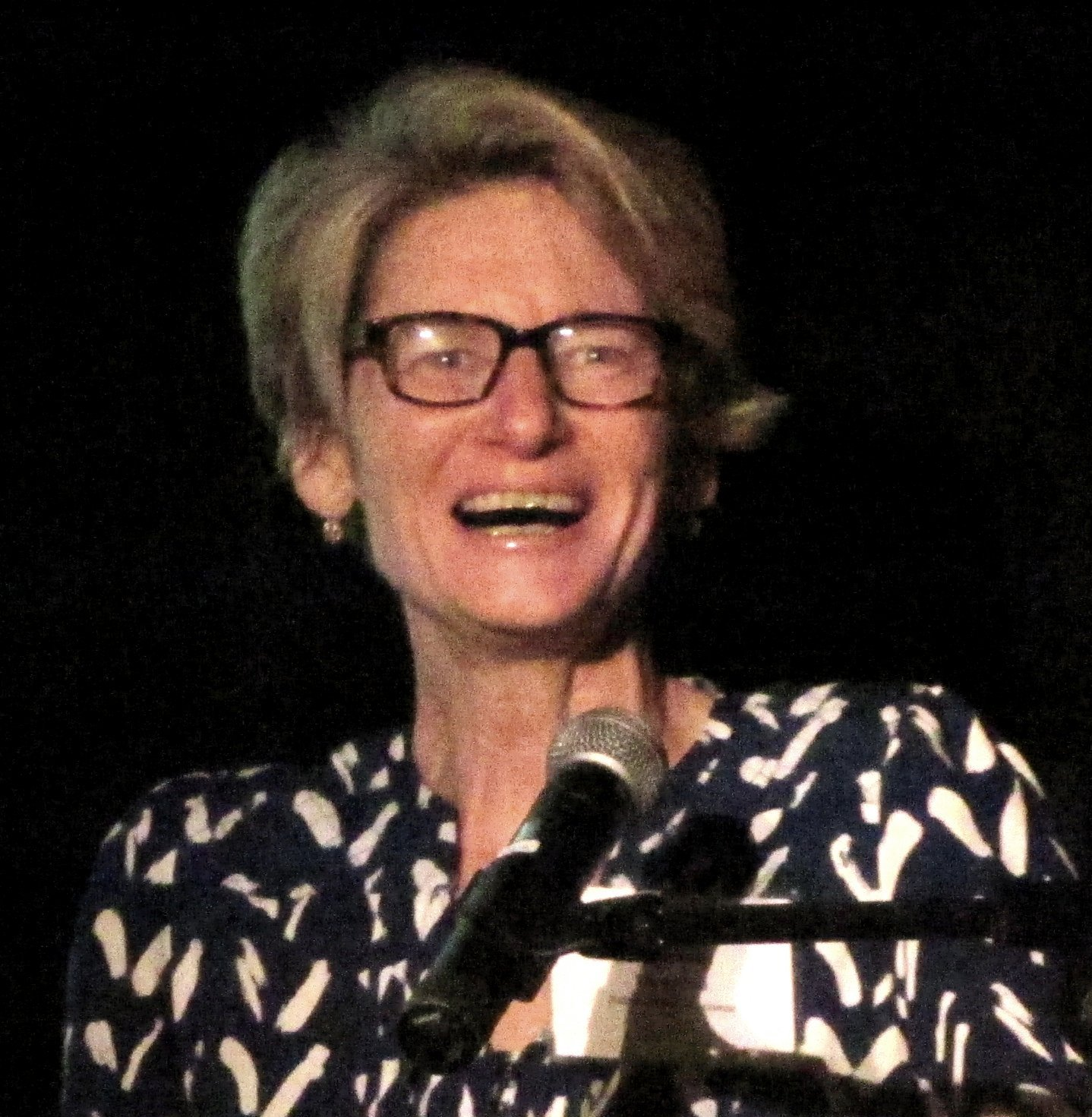

Elizabeth Marincola is the Senior Advisor for Communications and Advocacy at the African Academy of Sciences and is responsible for AAS Open Research, the Academy’s publishing platform. She has advocated for increased government resources dedicated to science and improved public education in science, and is an advocate of open access to the scientific literature, open scholarship and advancing research communication. Her 2013 TEDMED talk addresses many issues facing science, technology and medicine (STM) publishers, and she has advocated for quality research in Africa and why it is important. She also serves as an Ambassador for the European Science Foundation's Plan S.

== Career ==
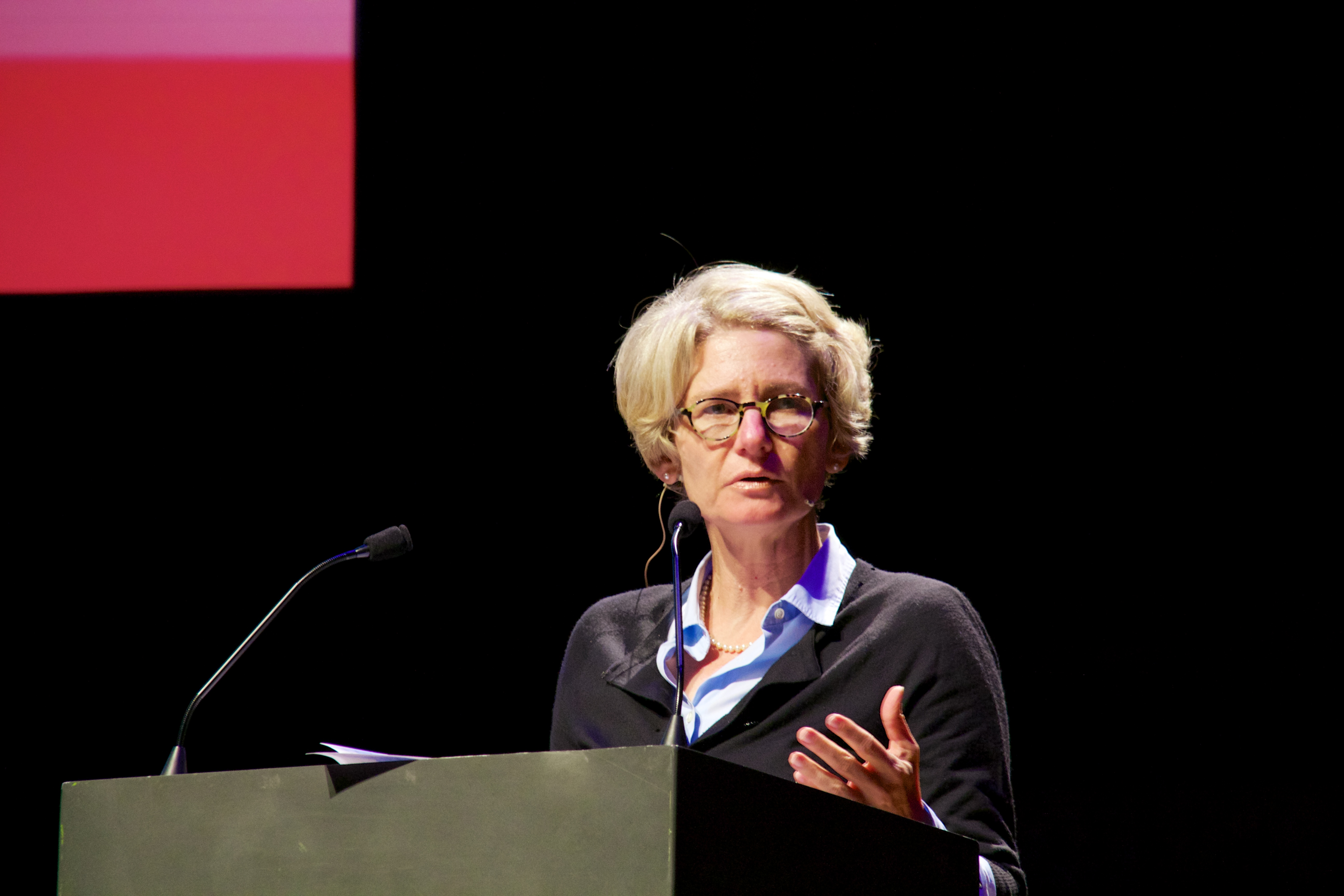
Marincola presenting at Wikimania in 2014

Marincola received her undergraduate degree from Stanford University as well as her MBA from Stanford Graduate School of Business. She is the author or co-author of dozens of articles published in journals and magazines, including Harvard Business Review, Cell and Science. According to Johns Hopkins University, Marincola is the only nonscientist to be named the Fae Golden Kass Lecturer at Harvard Medical School.

From 1991 to 2005, Marincola served as Executive Director of The American Society for Cell Biology (ASCB), which is described by Johns Hopkins University as "a scientific society which is a leader in Congressional advocacy for biomedical research funding, promoting access to the scientific literature, and the support of women and underrepresented minorities in science," and publisher of Molecular Biology of the Cell. Under Marincola's leadership, ASCB received the 2004 Institutional Presidential Award for Excellence in Science, Mathematics and Engineering Mentoring from the President of the United States. In 2004 Marincola was named by ASCB as the first Citizen Member of the Society (with actor and advocate Christopher Reeve).

Marincola served on the first National Institutes of Health PubMed Central National Advisory Committee from 2000 to 2003, on the Board of Directors for the Public Library of Science (PLOS) from 2005 to 2011, and as the first Chair of the Board of Directors of the Open Access journal eLife from 2012 to 2013.

From 2005 to 2013, Marincola was President and CEO of the Society for Science & the Public (SSP) and publisher of Science News and Science News for Kids. During her tenure at SSP, Science News received 2009 EXCEL Awards from the Society of National Association Publications (renamed later that year to Association Media & Publishing) for General Excellence and Most Improved Magazine. As President of SSP, Marincola served on the Advisory Board of the USA Science and Engineering Festival, and participated in SSP's Science Talent Search program.

From 2013 to 2016, Marincola was Chief Executive Officer of the Public Library of Science (PLOS).

Marincola joined the African Academy of Sciences on January 3, 2017.

== See also ==
African Academy of Sciences
