= Anamesa =

US academic journal

Anamesa is an interdisciplinary academic journal published by New York University, specifically by students of the John W. Draper Master's Program in Humanities and Social Thought. From its debut in the spring of 2003 up untl the spring of 2010 it was jointly funded and edited with the Center for Latin American and Caribbean Studies.

In Greek, anamesa is an adverb that means "between".

The journal produces two issues per year. Prior editions with CLACS cycled though four themes: Democracy, Culture, Violence, and an Editor's Choice. As of fall 2010, the editors have decided to reevaluate the issue of what themes to use and especially their set rotation, which may be dropped as a format choice.

After the CLACS withdrew its support, the journal underwent a restructuring of its web presence and information presented on the site may have been inaccurate for some time. As of 2012, the site has updated its information yet is still undergoing changes.
