= BMC Genomics =

- Discipline: Genomics, proteomics
- Language: English

Publication details
- History: 2000–present
- Publisher: BioMed Central
- Open access: Yes
- License: Creative Commons Attribution
- Impact factor: 3.7 (2024)

Standard abbreviations
- ISO 4: BMC Genom.

Indexing
- ISSN: 1471-2164

Links
- Journal homepage

BMC Genomics is an open-access scientific journal covering all areas of genomics and proteomics. The journal was established in 2000 and is published by BioMed Central. Its 2024 impact factor is 3.7.

== Abstracting and Indexing ==
The journal is indexed in PubMed, PubMed Central, MEDLINE, BIOSIS Previews, EMBASE, Scopus, Zoological Record, and other indexing services.
