= Statistical Institute of Catalonia =

Spanish organization devoted to statistics in Catalonia

Coordinates: 41°23′16.19″N 2°10′25.41″E

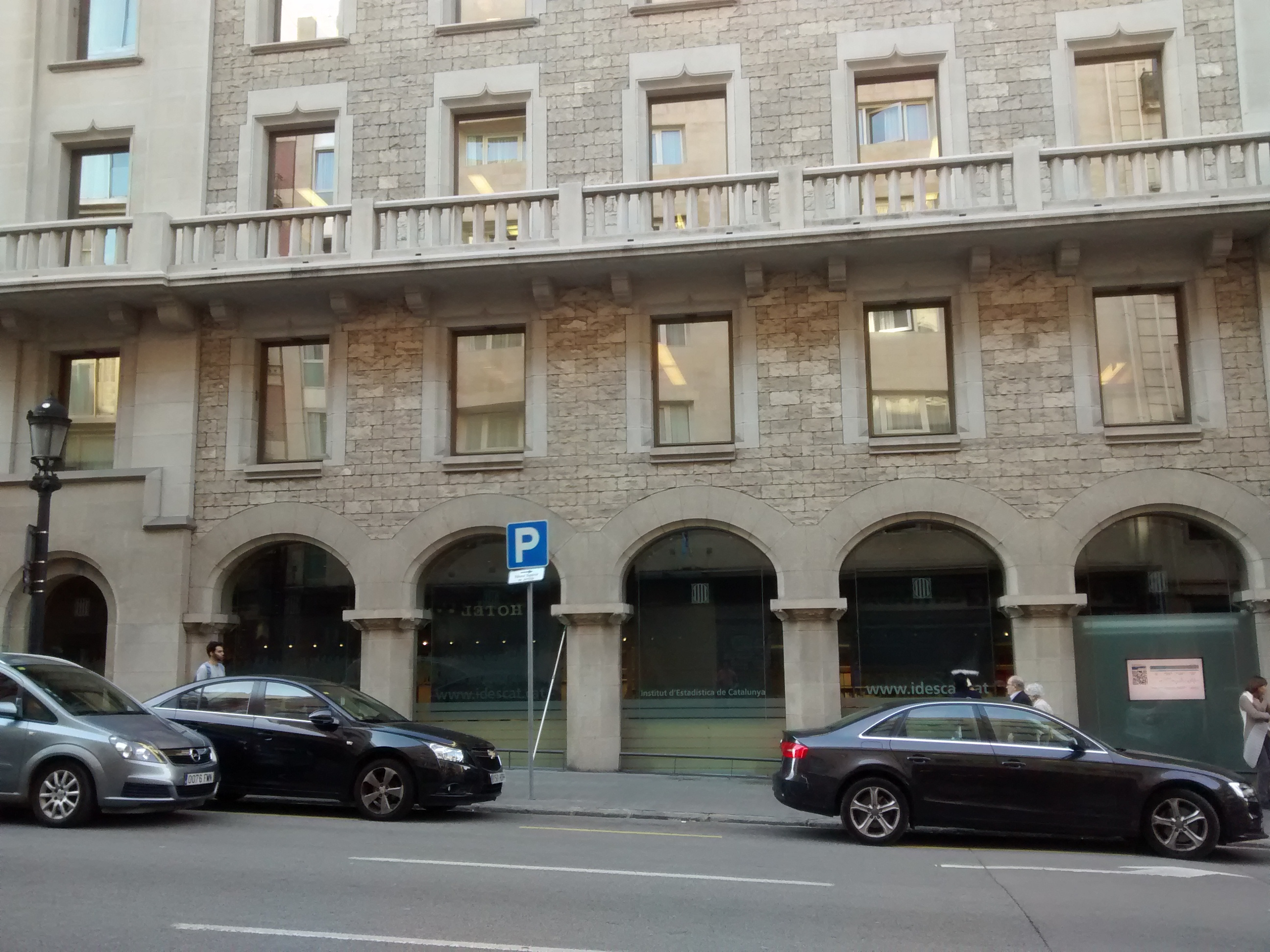
Statistical Institute of Catalonia

The Statistical Institute of Catalonia (in Catalan: Institut d'Estadística de Catalunya, usually referred to by its acronym IDESCAT) is the official body responsible for collecting, processing, and disseminating statistics in the autonomous community of Catalonia, Spain. The institute comes under the Department of the Economy and Finances of the Generalitat de Catalunya (Government of Catalonia). Its offices are on Via Laietana, Barcelona. It operates under the Ministry of Economy and Finance of the Catalan government and provides data essential for regional planning, economic analysis, and decision-making across various sectors.

== History ==
The Statistical Institute of Catalonia was officially established in 1989, marking a pivotal moment in the evolution of regional statistics in Spain. Its creation was rooted in the Statute of Autonomy of Catalonia, which aimed to empower the region with greater self-governance and autonomy over various domains, including statistics. Prior to the establishment of Idescat, statistical activities in Catalonia were managed by Spain’s National Statistics Institute (INE), which primarily focused on national-level data collection and analysis.

The founding of Idescat represented a significant shift toward regional statistical independence, enabling Catalonia to develop a statistical system tailored to its unique socio-economic context. This initiative was part of a broader movement across Spain to decentralize administrative functions and enhance regional governance.

In its early years, Idescat focused on building a robust infrastructure for data collection and analysis. The institute launched several key surveys and statistical projects aimed at addressing the specific needs of Catalonia’s diverse population and economy. Over time, it has evolved into a comprehensive statistical agency, integrating modern methodologies and technologies to enhance the quality and accessibility of its data.

Idescat has continually adapted to the changing landscape of data needs and technological advancements. It has expanded its scope of activities beyond traditional demographic and economic statistics to include social, environmental, and sectoral data. The institute has also prioritised collaboration with various stakeholders, including academic institutions, local governments, and the private sector, to ensure that its data reflects the realities of Catalonia and informs policy decisions effectively .

== Responsibilities ==
The core function of the Statistical Institute of Catalonia is to manage and coordinate all the statistical activities carried out by the government of Catalonia. Its main responsibilities include:

- Data Collection: Idescat conducts surveys and collects data in areas such as demography, economy, labor, environment, and education.
- Statistical Analysis: It processes raw data and generates reports, analyses, and indicators used by policymakers, researchers, and businesses.
- Dissemination: Idescat makes its findings available through publications, press releases, and an online portal, where users can access a wide range of statistics.
- Coordination: The institute coordinates with other public and private entities to ensure that all statistics produced in Catalonia are standardised and harmonised with international guidelines .

== Key publications ==
Idescat produces several key statistical reports that are regularly updated. These include:

- Gross Domestic Product (GDP) reports at both regional and local levels, reflecting the economic performance of Catalonia.
- Demographic Statistics, providing insights into population trends, migration, birth rates, and mortality.
- Labour Market Surveys, which include employment rates, unemployment figures, and sectoral employment distribution.Trade and Industry Reports, which analyze trends in the primary economic sectors of Catalonia.

These reports are widely used by government officials, economists, businesses, and academics to inform decisions and strategies.

== Data accessibility ==
Idescat is committed to making data accessible to the public. The institute offers an extensive online database where users can access a variety of statistics free of charge. This database includes detailed time series and microdata, providing flexibility for users to tailor data to their needs. In addition, Idescat offers tools for data visualization, such as interactive maps and graphs, to make the information more user-friendly .

== International cooperation ==
Idescat collaborates with both national and international statistical bodies to ensure that its methodologies and data align with global standards. It works closely with Spain’s National Statistics Institute (INE) and other regional statistical offices. At the European level, Idescat follows the guidelines of Eurostat, the statistical office of the European Union, which ensures that its data are comparable with statistics from other EU regions.

The statistical insights provided by Idescat play a crucial role in shaping Catalonia’s social and economic policies. The data inform regional development plans, labor market interventions, education policies, and environmental management strategies. Moreover, Idescat’s work supports Catalonia’s efforts to position itself as a competitive economy within Spain and the European Union by providing key indicators that highlight regional strengths and challenges.
