= BMC Health Services Research =

- Discipline: Health care
- Language: English

Publication details
- History: 2001–present
- Publisher: BioMed Central
- Frequency: Yearly
- Open access: Yes
- License: Creative Commons Attribution License
- Impact factor: 1.987 (2019)

Standard abbreviations
- ISO 4: BMC Health Serv. Res.

Indexing
- CODEN: BHSRAX
- ISSN: 1472-6963
- OCLC no.: 47657385

Links
- Journal homepage

BMC Health Services Research is an open access healthcare journal, which covers research on the subject of health services. It was established in 2001 and is published by BioMed Central.

== Abstracting and indexing ==
BMC Health Services Research is abstracted and indexed in PubMed, MEDLINE, Chemical Abstracts Service, EMBASE, Scopus, CINAHL, Current Contents, and CAB International. The journal is included in the Web of Science and according to the Journal Citation Reports has a 2018 impact factor of 1.932.

All articles are also archived by PubMed Central, the University of Potsdam, INIST, and in e-Depot.

== See also ==
- BMC journals
- Human Resources for Health on BioMed Central
