= Healthcare Information For All =

Healthcare Information For All (HIFA)
- Formation: October 2006; 20 years ago
- Type: Global health network
- Headquarters: Charlbury, Oxford, UK
- Coordinator: Neil Pakenham-Walsh
- Website: www.hifa.org

Healthcare Information For All (HIFA) is a global campaign and community of practice of health professionals, publishers, librarians, technologists, researchers, policymakers, and patient representatives, working to improve the availability and use of reliable healthcare information worldwide. The rationale for HIFA is described in a Lancet paper, commissioned by the World Health Organization. The paper notes that the lack of availability and use of reliable healthcare information in low- and middle-income countries is a major contributor to avoidable death and suffering, and recommends multistakeholder action to accelerate progress.

HIFA was launched in October 2006 at the 10th Congress of the Association for Health Information and Libraries in Africa in Mombasa, Kenya (it was initially called HIFA 2015). It currently has more than 20,000 professional members from 2500 health and development organisations in 180 countries.

== Vision and strategy ==
The HIFA vision is: "A world where every person and every health worker will have access to the reliable healthcare information they need to protect their own health and the health of others, and will be protected from health misinformation". HIFA explores how to meet the information needs of citizens as well as health workers and health policymakers, recognising the importance of citizens, parents and children as providers of care, especially in low-resource settings where health workers may be absent or hard to reach.

The HIFA Strategy (2022–24) describes seven strategic shifts to accelerate progress towards universal access to reliable healthcare information: convene stakeholders; strengthen collaboration with the World Health Organization; promote multilingualism; identify and address priority issues; harness collective intelligence; strengthen advocacy; and protect from misinformation.

== Structure ==
The network is administered by the Global Healthcare Information Network CIC, a nonprofit organisation based in the United Kingdom and a non-State actor in official relations with the World Health Organization.

The HIFA community interacts on six online discussion forums: HIFA, CHIFA, HIFA-Portuguese, HIFA-French, HIFA-Spanish, and HIFA-Zambia (the total number of members is more than 20,000 for all forums):

- HIFA (since 2006) is in English.
- CHIFA (since 2006) is also in English and focuses on child health and rights. CHIFA is administered jointly by Global Healthcare Information Network, International Child Health Group (Royal College of Paediatrics and Child Health), and International Society for Social Paediatrics and Child Health.
- HIFA-Portuguese (since 2009), HIFA-French (2010-) and HIFA-Spanish (2018-) are collaborations between the World Health Organization and Global Healthcare Information Network. They explore how to improve the availability and use of reliable healthcare information in those languages, and serve also as dedicated global health networks for Portuguese, French and Spanish speakers. Portuguese speakers were also supported by the earlier ePortuguêse scheme, developed by the WHO.
- HIFA-Zambia was launched in 2011 in collaboration with the Zambia UK Health Workforce Alliance.

== Recognition ==
- An external evaluation in 2011 concluded that "HIFA achieves an extraordinary level of activity on minimal resources from which many people around the world benefit".
- The British Medical Association and the World Medical Association adopted healthcare information for all as official policy in 2015 and 2019, respectively.
- By 2022, almost 500 health and development organisations worldwide had officially declared their commitment to healthcare information for all.
- In February 2022, Global Healthcare Information Network CIC (the NGO that houses the secretariat of HIFA) was admitted as a non-State actor in official relations with the World Health Organization.

== Challenges ==
HIFA's impact is limited by its very low human resource capacity (one professional staff plus volunteers). This in turn is related to lack of investment by funding agencies in the availability and use of reliable healthcare information.

However, since 2020 the COVID-19 pandemic and its associated "infodemic" have underlined the fundamental importance of access to reliable healthcare information. "Never before has everyone been so aware of the need for reliable healthcare information, and yet so vulnerable to misinformation."
