= Advances in Production Engineering & Management =

- Discipline: Manufacturing engineering, Manufacturing, Industrial engineering, Production engineering, Management
- Language: english

Publication details
- Publisher: Production Engineering Institute (Slovenia)
- Frequency: quarterly
- Open access: yes

Standard abbreviations
- ISO 4: Adv. Prod. Eng. Manag.

Indexing
- ISSN: 1854-6250

Links
- Journal homepage

Advances in Production Engineering & Management (APEM) is an interdisciplinary refereed journal. It is published quarterly by Production Engineering Institute (PEI), an organisational unit of the Faculty of mechanical engineering at the University of Maribor. The main goal of journal is to present high quality research developments in all areas of production engineering and production management, as well as their applications in industry and services, to a broad audience of academics and practitioners. Like most scientific journals, it can be obtained in print or in electronic form.

Advances in Production Engineering & Management is abstracted and indexed in the world's leading bibliographic databases, including Web of Science (Science Citation Index Expanded – SCIE, Journal Citation Reports – JCR, and Current Contents – CC), Scopus, Inspec, EBSCO, and ProQuest.

In the Web of Science (THOMSON REUTERS) bibliographic database the journal is included into two categories:

1. Engineering, Manufacturing;
2. Material Science, Multidisciplinary.

The journal Advances in Production Engineering & Management has received its first impact factor calculated by Thomson Reuters in June 2016. The current impact factor is 2.5, Q3 (Journal Citation Reports 2025, year 2024).
