= Acta Botanica Brasilica =

- Discipline: Botany
- Language: English
- Edited by: Thaís Elias Almeida

Publication details
- History: 1987-present
- Publisher: Brazilian Society of Botany (Brazil)
- Frequency: Continuously
- Open access: Yes
- License: Creative Commons Attribution CC-BY 4.0

Standard abbreviations
- ISO 4: Acta Bot. Bras.

Indexing
- ISSN: 0102-3306 (print); 1677-941X (web)
- LCCN: 92650438
- OCLC no.: 20766614

Links
- Journal homepage; Online access; Online archive

Acta Botanica Brasilica is a peer-reviewed scientific journal published by the Brazilian Society of Botany. It was established in 1987 and publishes original articles in all areas of botany, basic or applied. The journal publishes original articles on all aspects of plant (including algae) and fungi biology, in English.

== Abstracting and indexing ==
The journal is abstracted and indexed in:

- Biological Abstracts
- CAB - International - CABI
- Current Contents/Life Sciences
- DOAJ - Directory of Open Access Journals
- Journal Citation Reports
- LATINDEX - Sistema Regional de Información en Línea para Revistas Científicas de América Latina, el Caribe, España y Portugal
- SciELO Citation Index
- SCImago - Journal & Country Rank
- SCOPUS database
- Web of Science/Clarivate Analytics

According to the Journal Citation Reports, the journal has a 2013/2014 impact factor of 0.553, ranking it 159th out of 188 journals in the category "Plant Sciences".
