= Open Medicine (De Gruyter journal) =

- Discipline: Medicine
- Language: English

Publication details
- Former name: Central European Journal of Medicine
- History: 2006-present
- Publisher: Walter de Gruyter
- Frequency: Continuous
- Open access: Yes
- License: Creative Commons-BY-NC-ND
- Impact factor: 1.221 (2018)

Standard abbreviations
- ISO 4: Open Med. (Wars.)

Indexing
- ISSN: 2391-5463
- Central European Journal of Medicine
- ISSN: 1895-1058 (print); 1644-3640 (web)

Links
- Journal homepage; Central European Journal of Medicine

Open Medicine is a peer-reviewed open access medical journal. It is published by De Gruyter and the editor-in-chief is Prof. Eric J.G. Sijbrands (Erasmus MC, Rotterdam). It was established in 2006 as the Central European Journal of Medicine, co-published by Versita and Springer Science+Business Media. In 2014 the journal was moved to De Gruyter, after which it obtained its current name in 2015 when it became open access.

== Abstracting and indexing ==
The journal is abstracted and indexed in:

- AGRICOLA
- CAB Direct (database)
- Chemical Abstracts Service
- EBSCO Discovery Service
- Embase
- Scopus
- ProQuest databases
- Science Citation Index Expanded

According to the Journal Citation Reports, the journal has a 2018 impact factor of 1.221.
