= BioMed Central =

British academic publisher

- Parent company: Springer Nature
- Status: Active
- Founded: 2000; 26 years ago
- Founder: Current Science Group
- Headquarters location: London, WC1; United Kingdom
- Distribution: Open access
- Publication types: Scientific journals
- Nonfiction topics: Science
- Official website: link.springer.com/brands/bmc

Logo of BioMed Central until 2018

BioMed Central (BMC) is a United Kingdom-based, for-profit scientific open access publisher that produces over 250 scientific journals. All its journals are published online only. BioMed Central describes itself as the first and largest open access science publisher. It was founded in 2000 and has been owned by Springer, now Springer Nature, since 2008.

== History ==
BioMed Central was founded in 2000 as part of the Current Science Group (now Science Navigation Group, SNG), a nursery of scientific publishing companies. SNG chairman Vitek Tracz developed the concept for the company after NIH director Harold Varmus's PubMed Central concept for open-access publishing was scaled back. The first director of the company was Jan Velterop. Chemistry Central was established in 2006 and the PhysMath Central journal imprint in 2007.

In 2002, the company introduced article processing charges, and these have since been the primary source of revenue. In 2007, Yale University Libraries stopped subsidizing BioMed Central article processing charges for Yale researchers.

In October 2008, it was announced that BioMed Central (along with Chemistry Central and PhysMath Central) had been acquired by Springer Science+Business Media, the second largest STM publisher. The Chemistry Central and PhysMath Central brands have since been retired.

In November 2008, BioMed Central became an official supporting organisation of Healthcare Information For All.

Following the merger of BMC into Springer Nature, BMC journals were gradually converted to the general Springer Nature software. The software migration meant the loss of several features, often related to open science requirements, like the ability to download a machine-readable version of the paper (in XML format), direct download of PDF files and the ability to read articles without cookies.

== Journals ==
BioMed Central's flagship journals include BMC Bioinformatics, BMC Biology, BMC Medicine, Genome Biology and Genome Medicine. It also produces the BMC Series of journals covering the fields of biology and medicine. Most of the other journals published by BioMed Central are owned and produced independently by societies and academic editorial boards, with BioMed Central providing the hosting, publishing platform and marketing.

All journals are published online; some of the flagship journals have in the past also been available as print subscriptions, such as Arthritis Research & Therapy. Publications in BioMed Central journals are, immediately upon publication, released under the Creative Commons "Attribution" license which grants permission to reuse publications and produce derivative work. The only exceptions to this (as of 2010) were the flagship journals, which reserved rights on review and commentary content; those articles were available to purchase on a subscription or on a pay-per-view basis, becoming freely available (but not fully open access) to all after six months; however, as of January 2015, "no subscription fees apply to these journals or to any articles published in them."

=== Open peer review ===
In 2001, BioMed Central was the first publisher to carry out open peer review as default, by openly posting named peer reviewer reports alongside published articles as part of a 'pre-publication history' for all medical journals in the BMC series. As of 2020, 70 BMC journals were operating fully open peer review.

=== BMC Series ===
The BMC Series is a collection of several dozen online research journals published by BioMed Central. Like all other BioMed Central journals, they have a policy of open access to the research articles they publish. Between them, they cover all major subject areas within biology and medicine. Two of the journals, BMC Biology and BMC Medicine, have a broad scope, and aim to publish particularly significant research. A third journal, BMC Research Notes, publishes scientifically valid research outputs that cannot be considered as full research or methodology articles across all scientific and clinical disciplines, while BMC Proceedings publishes conference proceedings and BMC Medical Research Methodology focuses on methodological approaches to healthcare research (especially methodology of epidemiological research, clinical trials and meta-analysis/systematic review). The other journals specialise on a particular subject area. Due to their free licensing, images from BMC journals can be reused in other places.

- BMC Anesthesiology
- BMC Biochemistry
- BMC Bioinformatics
- BMC Biology
- BMC Biomedical Engineering
- BMC Biophysics
- BMC Biotechnology
- BMC Cancer
- BMC Cardiovascular Disorders
- BMC Chemistry
- BMC Complementary Medicine and Therapies
- BMC Developmental Biology
- BMC Ear, Nose and Throat Disorders
- BMC Ecology
- BMC Emergency Medicine
- BMC Endocrine Disorders
- BMC Ecology and Evolution
- BMC Primary Care
- BMC Gastroenterology
- BMC Genetics
- BMC Genomics
- BMC Geriatrics
- BMC Health Services Research
- BMC Hematology
- BMC Immunology
- BMC Infectious Diseases
- BMC Medical Education
- BMC Medical Ethics
- BMC Medical Genetics
- BMC Medical Genomics
- BMC Medical Imaging
- BMC Medical Informatics and Decision Making
- BMC Medical Research Methodology
- BMC Medicine
- BMC Microbiology
- BMC Molecular Biology
- BMC Molecular and Cell Biology
- BMC Musculoskeletal Disorders
- BMC Nephrology
- BMC Neurology
- BMC Neuroscience
- BMC Nursing
- BMC Nutrition
- BMC Ophthalmology
- BMC Oral Health
- BMC Palliative Care
- BMC Pediatrics
- BMC Pharmacology and Toxicology
- BMC Physiology
- BMC Plant Biology
- BMC Pregnancy and Childbirth
- BMC Proceedings
- BMC Psychiatry
- BMC Psychology
- BMC Public Health
- BMC Pulmonary Medicine
- BMC Research Notes
- BMC Rheumatology
- BMC Sports Science, Medicine and Rehabilitation
- BMC Structural Biology
- BMC Surgery
- BMC Systems Biology
- BMC Urology
- BMC Veterinary Research
- BMC Women's Health
- BMC Zoology

Most BMC Series journals have an impact factor. As of 2016, for the 53 journals with impact factors, BMC Biology had the highest at 7.98.

=== Additional published journals ===
- Particle and Fibre Toxicology ISSN 1743-8977

== Databases ==
The company also has hosted biomedical databases, including the ISRCTN registry (previously Current Controlled Trials), a Primary Registry of clinical trials in the WHO Registry Network. The Biology Image Library and the Cases Database, a database of medical case reports, were closed in 2014. The company also provided hosting for institutional repositories of publications based on the DSpace platform under the brand Open Repository. The Open Repository activity was sold to Atmire in 2016.

== See also ==
- Open Access Scholarly Publishers Association, of which BioMed Central is a founding member
- Trials (journal)
