= Urbani =

Urbani is a surname. Notable people with the surname include:

- Amancay Urbani (born 1991), Argentine footballer
- Carlo Urbani (1956–2003), Italian doctor
- Dino Urbani (1882–1958), Italian fencer
- Ellen Urbani (born 1969), American author
- Giovanni Urbani (1900–1969), Italian Cardinal of the Roman Catholic Church
- Giovanni Battista Urbani (1923–2018), Italian communist politician
- Giuliano Urbani (born 1937), Italian academic and politician
- Luca Urbani (born 1957), Italien ASI astronaut
- Massimo Urbani (1957–1993), Italian jazz alto saxophonist
- Riccardo Urbani (born 1958), Italian swimmer
- Samantha Urbani (born 1987), American singer, songwriter, visual artist, filmmaker and producer from Mystic, Connecticut
- Tom Urbani (1968–2022), American baseball player
- Valentino Urbani (1690–1722), Italian opera singer and actor

See also

- Liber Urbani, first English courtesy book
- Steriphoma urbani, a species of plant in the family Capparaceae
- Urbani izziv, English-language journal
