= Studia Historica Slovenica =

- Discipline: History
- Language: Slovenian
- Edited by: Darko Friš

Publication details
- History: 2001–present
- Publisher: Zgodovinsko društvo dr. Franca Kovačiča v Mariboru (Slovenia)
- Frequency: Triannual

Standard abbreviations
- ISO 4: Stud. Hist. Slov.

Indexing
- ISSN: 1580-8122

Links
- Journal homepage

Studia Historica Slovenica is a peer-reviewed academic journal covering the contemporary history. It is published by the Zgodovinsko društvo dr. Franca Kovačiča v Mariboru (Historical Society dr. Franc Kovačič in Maribor), based in Maribor and the editor-in-chief is Darko Friš. The journal was established in 2001.

Journal acts as an "interdisciplinary scientific review in the field of history, ethnology, history of art, archeology, geography and linguistics and at the same time publishes critics and reports about other publications and activities in professions, which it covers".

== Abstracting and indexing ==
The journal is abstracted and indexed in:

- Historical Abstracts (EBSCO)
- America: History and Life (EBSCO)
- Ulrich's Periodicals Directory
- Scopus (2002-2003, 2006–2020)

== See also ==
- List of academic journals published in Slovenia
- Zgodovinski časopis
