= Truhlář =

Truhlář (feminine: Truhlářova) is a Czech surname. It is an occupational surname literally meaning carpenter, cabinet maker. Notable people with the surname include:

- Donald Truhlar (born 1944), American scientist
- Vladimir Truhlar (1912–1977), Slovenian theologian
- Antonín Truhlář (1849–1908), Czech literary historian and educator
