= ACSI =

ACSI may also refer to:

- Acta Chimica Slovenica, a peer-reviewed chemical journal published by the Slovenian Chemical Society
- American Customer Satisfaction Index, an economic indicator that measures the satisfaction of consumers in the U.S.
- Anglo-Chinese School (Independent)
- Associate of the Chartered Institute for Securities & Investment (ACSI)
- Association of Christian Schools International
- Audax Club Sportivo Italiano
- Advanced Cyclotron Systems Inc, a supplier of medical cyclotrons
- Abstract communication service interface, a part of IEC 61850 Standard
