= Acta Histriae =

- Discipline: History
- Language: Slovenian
- Edited by: Darko Darovec

Publication details
- History: 1993–present
- Publisher: The Historical Society of Southern Primorska of Koper (Slovenia)
- Frequency: Quarterly

Standard abbreviations
- ISO 4: Acta Histriae

Indexing
- ISSN: 1318-0185

Links
- Journal homepage

Acta Histriae is a peer-reviewed academic journal covering the contemporary history. It is published by the Historical Society of Southern Primorska of Koper, based in Koper and the editor-in-chief is Darko Friš. The journal was established in 1993.

Journal "publishes original scientific articles in the field of humanities and historiography in particular", with primary focus on the Istria and Mediterranean Slovenia.

== Abstracting and indexing ==
The journal is abstracted and indexed in:

- Social Sciences Citation Index (SSCI),
- Arts and Humanities Citation Index (A&HCI)
- Journal Citation Reports, Social Sciences Edition
- Scopus (2009–2020)
- European Reference Index for the Humanities and Social Sciences (ERIH PLUS)
- Internationale Bibliographie der Zeitschriftenliteratur
- International Bibliography of the Social Sciences
- Referativnyi Zhurnal Viniti
- Directory of Open Access Journals

== See also ==
- List of academic journals published in Slovenia
- Zgodovinski časopis
