= Geografija Slovenije =

Slovenian geography book series

The book series Geografija Slovenije (English Geography of Slovenia), published by the Anton Melik Geographical Institute, was founded in 1998 to publish the latest findings in Slovenian geography research. It focuses on the physical, human, and regional geography of Slovenia as well as on Slovenian geographical terminology, Slovenian place names, and Slovenian thematic cartography.
