= Acta Geographica Slovenica =

- Discipline: Human geography, physical geography, regional geography
- Language: English, Slovenian
- Edited by: Blaž Komac

Publication details
- Former name(s): Acta Geographica, Geographica Slovenica
- History: 1952–present
- Publisher: Anton Melik Geographical Institute (Slovenia)
- Frequency: 3/year
- Open access: yes
- Impact factor: 1.341 (2019)

Standard abbreviations
- ISO 4: Acta Geogr. Slov.

Indexing
- ISSN: 1581-6613 (print); 1581-8314 (web)
- LCCN: 2004224167
- OCLC no.: 2004224167
- Geographica Slovenica
- ISSN: 0351-1731

Links
- Journal homepage

Acta Geographica Slovenica is a peer-reviewed scientific journal of geography published by the Anton Melik Geographical Institute covering human geography, physical geography, and regional geography. The editor-in-chief is Blaž Komac (Anton Melik Geographical Institute).

It was established in 1952 as Acta Geographica/Geografski Zbornik. In 2002 it merged with Geographica Slovenica, obtaining its current title reflecting this merger in 2003.

== Abstracting and indexing ==
This journal is abstracted and indexed in:

- Science Citation Index Expanded
- EBSCOhost
- GEOBASE
- Scopus
- GeoRef

According to the Journal Citation Reports, the journal has a 2019 impact factor of 1.341.

== See also ==
- List of academic journals published in Slovenia
