= Jota (food) =

Stew from the northern Adriatic regions

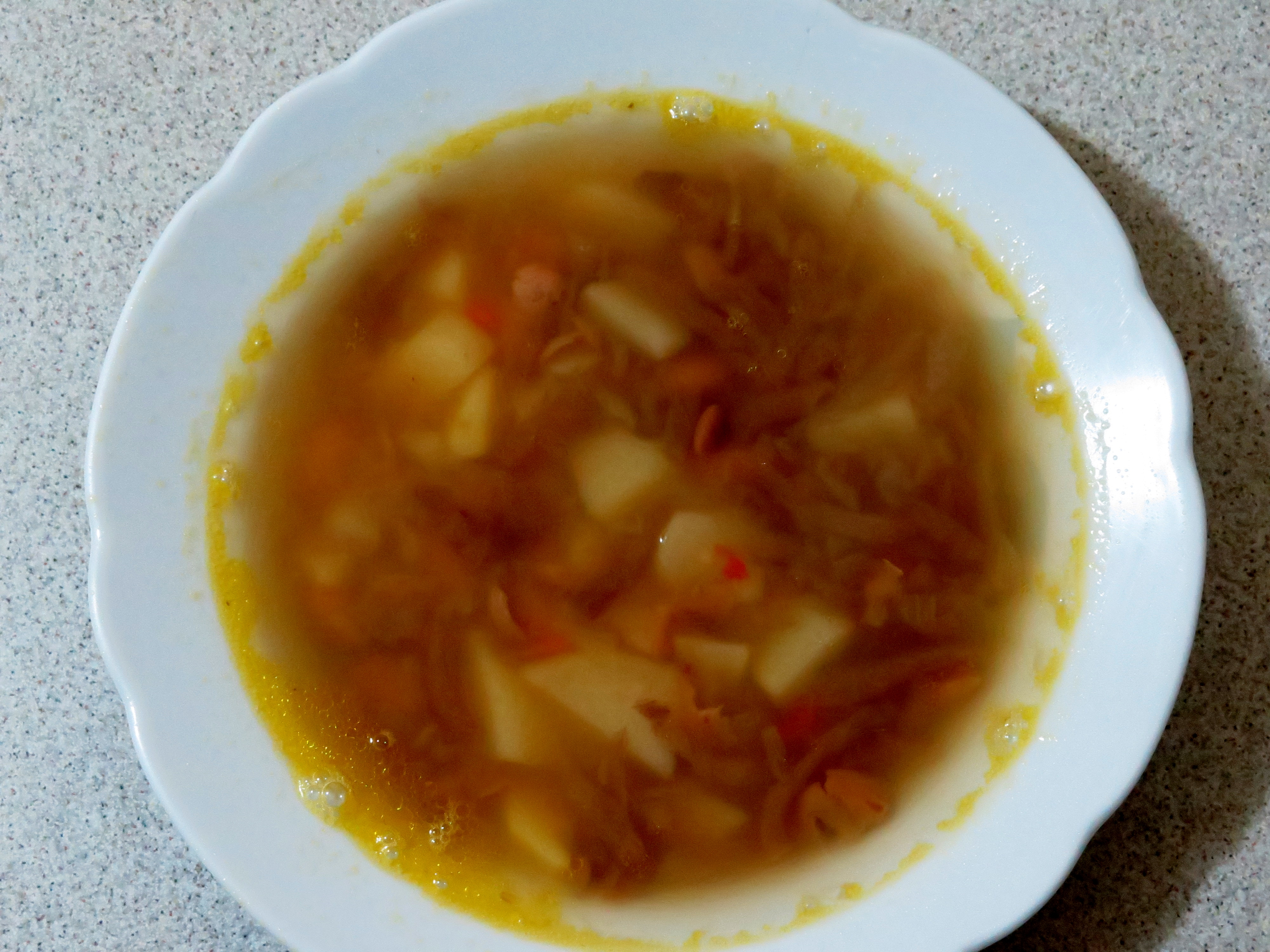
- Alternative names: Istrian stew
- Type: Stew
- Course: Primo (Italian course)
- Place of origin: Italy; Croatia; Slovenia
- Region or state: Istria; Friuli-Venezia Giulia
- Main ingredients: Beans, sauerkraut, potatoes, bacon, spare ribs, garlic

The jota or Istrian stew (Italian: Jota; Croatian: Istarska jota; Slovene: Jota) is a soup made with beans and sauerkraut or sour turnip, potatoes, bacon, and spare ribs, known in the northern Adriatic regions. Under the name jota, it is typical and especially popular in Trieste and its province (where it is considered to be the prime example of Triestine food), in the Istrian peninsula, in the province of Gorizia, in the whole Slovenian Littoral, in the Rijeka area, and in Friuli, especially in some of its peripheral areas (the highland region of Carnia, the Torre and Natisone river valleys or Slavia Veneta). The stew, based on etymology, most likely originated in Friuli before spreading east and south.

Jota seems to derive from a Celtic root and has parallels in ancient Friulian language.

The dish shows the influence of both Central European and Mediterranean cuisine. In most of the recipes, olive oil is used, and the main seasoning is garlic.

In Slovenian Istria, it is often eaten together with polenta.

== See also ==
- List of stews
