= Teorija in praksa =

- Discipline: Social sciences
- Language: Slovenian
- Edited by: Jernej Pikalo

Publication details
- History: 1964–present
- Publisher: Faculty of Social Sciences, Ljubljana (Slovenia)
- Frequency: Quarterly

Standard abbreviations
- ISO 4: Teor. Praksa

Indexing
- ISSN: 0040-3598
- LCCN: 68134760
- OCLC no.: 942105374

Links
- Journal homepage

Teorija in praksa is a peer-reviewed academic journal covering the social sciences. It is published by the Faculty of Social Sciences of the University of Ljubljana and the editor-in-chief is Jernej Pikalo. The journal was established in 1964.

== Abstracting and indexing ==
The journal is abstracted and indexed in:

- EBSCO databases
- Emerging Sources Citation Index
- International Bibliography of Periodical Literature
- Modern Language Association Database
- ProQuest databases
- Scopus

== See also ==
- List of academic journals published in Slovenia
