= Anton Melik =

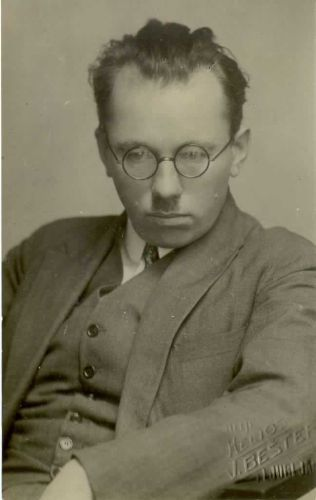
Anton Melik (photographer Veličan Bešter)

Anton Melik (January 1, 1890 – June 8, 1966) was a Slovene geographer.

== Biography ==
Melik was born in the village of Črna Vas in Carniola, part of Austria-Hungary. Before and during World War I, he studied at the University of Vienna, graduating in 1916 in history and geography. Later he was employed as a secondary school teacher. In 1926–1927 he became an associate professor at the Faculty of Arts of the University of Ljubljana, in 1932 a senior lecturer, and then in 1938 a professor.

In 1927 he received his PhD from the Faculty of Arts with his dissertation on the settlement of the Ljubljana Marsh. Between 1938 and 1966, he was a professor of geomorphology at the Department of Geography at the University of Ljubljana, succeeding professor Artur Gavazzi in 1938. With his work in this field he established his well-known geomorphological school.

In 1935–1936, the publishing house Slovenska matica published his monumental work Geografija Slovenije (The Geography of Slovenia) in two volumes with a general regional part, later extended with four additional books between 1954 and 1960, with a detailed regional description of particular areas of Slovenia: the Alps, Styria with Prekmurje and the Meža Valley, the Lower Sava Valley, and the Slovenian Littoral.

Between 1947 and 1960, Melik was head of the Department of Geography at the Faculty of Arts. Between 1948 and 1966, he was head of the Geographical Institute of the Slovenian Academy of Sciences and Arts. Between 1946/1947 and 1949/1950, he was chancellor of the University of Ljubljana, and he served twice as dean of the Faculty of Arts in 1940/1941 and 1945/1946. He retired in 1966. He died in Ljubljana.

In 1976, the Geographical Institute of the Slovenian Academy of Sciences and Arts, founded in 1946, was renamed the Anton Melik Geographical Institute in his honor.

== Family ==
His two brothers Franc Melik (born 1885), and Ivan Melik (born 1894) were killed in a grove known as Kosler's Thicket (Slovene: Kozlerjeva gošča, named after its former owner Peter Kosler), on November 25, 1943 together with 12 other victims by a unit of the collaborationist Slovenian Home Guard militia under the command of Franc Frakelj.

For his work on the geography of Slovenia and Yugoslavia, Melik received the Prešeren Award in 1947, 1949, and 1951. His son, Vasilij Melik, was a historian; his two other sons, Anton (1918) and Andrej (1927–1930), died as children.

== Sources ==
- Who was Anton Melik
- Ivan Gams, William Morris Davis, Anton Melik, slemenski nivoji in pobočni procesi v Sloveniji / William Morris Davis, Anton Melik, Level Top Ridges and Slope Processes in Slovenia, Geografski zbornik 41 (2001).
- Primož Jakopin, Zbornik ob 80-letnici FF, 1919-1999, Oddelek za geografijo (Collection Marking the 80th Anniversary of the Faculty of Arts, 1919-1999, Department of Geography).
