= Istrian identity =

Istrian regionalism

Flag and coat of arms of Istria

Istrian identity, also known as Istrianity, Istrianism or Istrianness, is the regionalist identity developed by the inhabitants of the part of Istria located in Croatia. Istria is the biggest peninsula in the Adriatic Sea and a multiethnic region divided between Croatia, Italy and Slovenia. Italians and Slovenes live in both the Italian and Slovene parts (which make up 1% and 9% of the territory of Istria, respectively), while in the Croatian part (90% of the region), there are Croats, Italians, Istro-Romanians and Istriot-speakers, as well as some non-native minorities. Most of Croatian Istria is located in the Istria County of the country. Istria is the region of Croatia where regionalist sentiment is the strongest.

In the 2011 Croatian census, 25,203 people of the Istria County, constituting 12% of its population, declared themselves to be Istrian before any other nationality, making it the most abundant one in the county after Croatian. People also declared an Istrian identity in the Primorje-Gorski Kotar County, the county where the rest of Croatian Istria is located, therefore making the number of people declaring an Istrian identity in Croatia a total of 25,409. Most of these people in these counties were ethnic Croats, but there were also Istro-Romanians declaring themselves as Istrian. Later, the 2021 Croatian census saw a decrease on Istrian self-designation, as 10,025 inhabitants of the Istria County used it.

It has been proposed that Istria gain greater autonomy within a more decentralized Croatia. Examples of supporters of this include several members of the Istrian Democratic Assembly (IDS), such as its former president Boris Miletić or the IDS deputy Emil Daus.

== See also ==
- Dalmatian identity
