= Anton Melik Geographical Institute =

Slovenian academic unit

Coordinates: 46°2′50.95″N 14°30′17″E

The Anton Melik Geographical Institute (Slovene: Geografski inštitut Antona Melika) was founded in 1946 by the Slovenian Academy of Sciences and Arts. In 1976 it was named after the Slovene geographer and academy member Anton Melik (1890–1966), who was the first head of the institute. Since 1981, the institute has been a member of the Research Center of the Slovenian Academy of Sciences and Arts. Until 1992 the institute was mainly engaged with researching glaciers, glacial and fluvial transformations of land surfaces, flooded areas, natural disasters, mountain farms, and social geography. Since 1993 the institute's main task has been to conduct geographical studies of Slovenia and its landscapes and to prepare basic geographical texts on Slovenia as a country and as part of the world.

Research is mostly directed toward physical, social, and regional geography and thematic cartography.

== Facilities ==
It has nine organizational units:

- Department of Physical Geography
- Department of Social Geography
- Department of Regional Geography
- Department of Natural Disasters
- Department of Environmental Protection
- Department of the Geographical Information System
- Department of Thematic Cartography
- Geographical Museum
- Geographical Library

The institute houses a map collection and three specialized geographical collections: Landscapes of Slovenia, Settlements of Slovenia, and Glaciers of Slovenia. It is headquarters of the Commission for the Standardization of Geographical Names of the Government of the Republic of Slovenia (Komisija za standardizacijo zemljepisnih imen Vlade Republike Slovenije).

== Publications ==
The institute publishes three scholarly publications. Geografija Slovenije (Geography of Slovenia) is a series of books that appears in Slovene once or twice a year. Acta Geographica Slovenica / Geografski Zbornik is a journal published twice a year in English and Slovene. The articles can be downloaded in Slovene or English from the journal homepage. Geografski informacijski sistemi v Sloveniji (Geographical Information Systems in Slovenia) is a bulletin published every second (even) year in Slovene.

== See also ==
- United Nations Conference on the Standardization of Geographical Names
