= Prispevki za novejšo zgodovino =

- Discipline: History
- Language: Slovenian
- Edited by: Jure Gašparič

Publication details
- History: 1960–present
- Publisher: Institute of Contemporary History, Slovenia (Slovenia)
- Frequency: Triannual

Standard abbreviations
- ISO 4: Prispev. Novejso Zgod.

Indexing
- ISSN: 0353-0329 (print); 2463-7807 (web)

Links
- Journal homepage

Prispevki za novejšo zgodovino (Contributions to Contemporary History / Contributions a l'histoire contemporaine / Beiträge zur Zeitgeschichte) is a peer-reviewed academic journal covering the contemporary history. It is published by the Institute of Contemporary History, Slovenia, based in Ljubljana and the editor-in-chief is Jure Gašparič. The journal was established in 1960 as Prispevki za zgodovino delavskega gibanja (Contributions to History of Workers' Movement) and in 1980, it was renamed to Prispevki za novejšo zgodovino.

== Abstracting and indexing ==
The journal is abstracted and indexed in:

- ERIH PLUS
- Scopus

== See also ==
- List of academic journals published in Slovenia
- Zgodovinski časopis
