= Acta Geotechnica Slovenica =

- Discipline: Geomechanics, geotechnical engineering
- Language: English
- Edited by: Ludvik Trauner

Publication details
- History: 2004-present
- Publisher: University of Maribor (Slovenia)
- Frequency: Biannual
- Impact factor: 0.10 (2012)

Standard abbreviations
- ISO 4: Acta Geotech. Slov.

Indexing
- ISSN: 1854-0171
- OCLC no.: 67766956

Links
- Journal homepage

Acta Geotechnica Slovenica is a biannual peer-reviewed scientific journal published by the University of Maribor, Faculty of Civil Engineering. The editor-in-chief is Ludvik Trauner (University of Maribor). The journal covers fundamental and applied research in the areas of geomechanics and geotechnical engineering. Topics covered include soil and rock mechanics, engineering geology, environmental geotechnics, geosynthetics, numerical and analytical methods, computer modelling, field and laboratory testing.

== History ==
Acta Geotechnica Slovenica was established in 2004 by:

- University of Maribor, Faculty of Civil Engineering
- University of Ljubljana, Faculty of Civil and Geodetic Engineering and Faculty of Natural Sciences and Engineering
- Slovenian Geotechnical Society
- Society for Underground and Geotechnical Constructions

== Abstracting and indexing ==
This journal is abstracted and indexed in:

- Science Citation Index Expanded
- International Construction database
- GeoRef

According to the Journal Citation Reports, the journal has a 2012 impact factor of 0.10.

== See also ==
- List of academic journals published in Slovenia
