= Vladimir Truhlar =

Slovenian theologian and philosopher

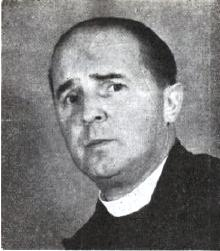
Karel Vladimir Truhlar

Karel Vladimir Truhlar (3 September 1912 – 4 January 1977) was a Slovenian theologian, philosopher, poet, and literary critic.

== Life and work ==
=== Early years ===
Karel Vladimir Truhlar was born on 3 September 1912 in Gorizia, a town in the former Austro-Hungarian Empire. His mother, Marija Malnerčič, came from Divača; his father, František Truhlař, of Czech origin, was a railway employee. During World War I, the family went to Jesenice in Upper Carniola in 1915, where they lived for some years in an attic.

In the Kingdom of Serbs, Croats and Slovenes, he attended primary school from 1918 to 1926, and was considered a clever and lively youth. Due to his excellent grades, and with the help of donors, he enrolled in a nine-year secondary school in Ljubljana, graduating in 1933.

His high school period was intense for both his spiritual formation and literary vocation. During this period, Truhlar was heavily influenced by Professor Ernest Tomc. Truhlar also joined the Catholic associations Dijaški Orel (Students’ Eagle), and Marijina Kongregacija (Marian Congregation); later, he joined Mlajci (Young People). He was a leader of the Green Ties, a students’ movement which protested against the despotism of Alexander I.

During his last year of high school, Truhlar decided to become a priest. He entered the diocesan seminary in 1933 to study philosophy, graduating after two years with the thesis Das Erkennen der Existenz (The Knowledge of Existence) at the Pontifical Gregorian University in Rome. This period is attributed to Truhlar's affirmation of Aleš Ušeničnik's philosophical theories.

Truhlar returned to Ljubljana in 1936, where he continued his study of theology. Unsatisfied with the typical structure of theological study, he turned to the theories of Romano Guardini, Maréchal, and other contemporary thinkers who promoted the existentialist aspect of philosophical research.

Even though he was a student at the seminary, he had to perform his military obligations (July–December 1938) in Osijek, Croatia, where he learned more Serbo-Croatian. In his spare moments in the town, he started to read Vladimir Solovyov's works, which opened up to him infinite possibilities of a Christian philosophy built on the metaphysics of uni-totality.

=== Theology studies ===
Truhlar was ordered priest on 29 October 1939 and received his theology degree in June 1941, with the thesis "Der Vergöttlichungeprocess bei Vladimir Solovjëv" (The process of divinization in Vladimir Solovyov ). He spent World War II in Rome alternating short periods of specialization with the activity of spiritual guide at the seminary in Ljubljana. Here, he decided to dedicate himself to spiritual theology, but he also intensely cultivated the study of dogmatic, as testified by the essay "Nauk Vladimira Solovjëva o razvoju dogme (Vladimir Solovyov’s doctrine on the evolution of dogma), published in the academic journal Bogoslovni vestnik.

In mid-1945, he followed the events of the Rožman’s faculty, first in Praglia (Padua), then in Alto Adige. On 18 November 1946, following the advice of father Augustine Bea, he entered the Society of Jesus. He spent his novitiate in Pullach from 1946 to 1948, where he met father Albert Stögger, who was entirely devoted to the connection between his human richness and Saint Ignatius' spirituality. In his school, Truhlar conceived the basis of his anthropology and of his Christology. In this environment, he took the path of experiential research, which Truhlar declined during his whole lifetime. Here, he learnt Christological humanism, known as the experience of the Absolute.

In 1949, he received the invitation from the Gregorian to go to Rome to get integrated into the teaching group of that university. With the collaboration of Stögger, he prepared research on Saint Ignatius’ interiority, published in the Revue d’ascetique et de mystique (Journal of Asceticism and Mysticism). Furthermore, an extract of this work, titled "Das Gotfunden des hl. Ignatius in sein letzen Jahren", was judged as the exact interpretation of Saint Ignatius’ spirituality. And with this, along with four other essays, he introduced himself as "professor extra-ordinarius" at the Gregorian. He was a lecturer from 1950; he became a full professor in 1956. For a short time, Truhlar occupied the Chair of Mariology, but he later manifested to rector father Dezza the wish he could devote his research and his teaching exclusively to spiritual theology.

Truhlar conceived studying as an action in the world; as for spiritual theology, he conceived it in a particular way as an initiation to the Christian experience. For five years of the 1960s, his lessons were attended by approximately 300 to 350 students from thirty national colleges. These activities also saw the participation of one hundred religious orders and congregations. Truhlar’s lessons covered a various range of topics, such as the spiritual theology of secularity and monasticism, the theology of work and of free time, the sacred and aesthetic absolute, politics, Weltanschauung, senses-spirit-experience, poetry, and spiritual life. His teaching evolved, passing from the analysis of single letters from St Paul to Christian humanism, from exquisitely religious topics to gnosology and aesthetics. In this, he always started from the distinction between a rational knowledge and an intellective, a-conceptual, and a-categorial knowledge.

=== Collaboration with Meddobje ===
For around ten years, he collaborated with the magazine Meddobje, published in Argentina. Here, he published the Christological essay "Razvijanje in križanje človeške narave" (Development and crucifixion of human nature, 1956) and the theological reflection "Preobražanje sveta in beg pred njim" (Transformation of the world and escape in front of it, 1956–57). In 1958, the collection of lyrics "Nova Zemlja" (The new land), and the essay "Krščanska doraslost" (Christian maturity) in Meddobje, was published in Buenos Aires. The following year, the reflection "Problem osebne pokorščine" (The problem of personal obedience) was published. In 1961, the poetic cycle of the Baptist followed by the essay-commentary "Revolucija, konservatorizem in življenje kulture" (Revolution, conservatism and life of the culture) was published in Meddobje. In the same year, his second poetic collection, "Rdeče bivanje" (The red existence), was published by SKA (Cultural Slovenian Action) in Buenos Aires.

In an interview on 24 May 1965, he claimed that internal events in Slovenia were misunderstood by some anti-communist writers; this caused tensions inside the SKA. Refused by Meddobje, the interview was published in Trieste by the review "Mladika" with the title "Pogovor pod Kvirinalom" (1966).

At the end of 1969, in Celje, it was printed at "Mohorjeva Družba "V dnevih šumi Ocean" (In the days the Ocean whispers), a republication of his previous collections reviewed and ordered in seven sections and two cycles. In 1971, he published the "Concetti fondamentali della teologia spirituale", where the peculiar features of his gnosology and ontology emerged. In 1973, his second lyrical collection, "Luč iz črne prsti" (The light from black silt), was published. In the same year, he published "Lessico di spiritualità", where the terms of the Catholic ethos were revisited from a modern perspective.

=== Later years and death ===
At the end of 1974, at the age of 62 – after having spent 25 years in Rome devoted to an intense didactic and research activity – Truhlar went back to his native country to Dravlje, a suburb of Ljubljana. His last years were marked by attacks from the conservative clergy, who were reluctant to the conciliar innovations, and Yugoslavian police – even though he was guaranteed free speech. He left Dravlje in June 1976 to retreat in voluntary exile to Bolzano. He suddenly died there from cerebral ischemia on the morning of 4 January 1977.

After his death, for the interest of his sister Zora and faithful student Lojze Bratina, an essay "Doživljanje absolutnega v slovenskem leposlovju" (The story of absolute in Slovenian literature), and two unpublished collections of lyrics "Motnordeči glas" (The murky red voice) and "Kri" (Blood) were published. Two other works, written with Professor G. Thils of the Catholic University in Leuven, were also published: "Laïcat et sainteté I." Laïcs et la vie chrétienne parfaite (1963), and "Laïcat et sainteté II." Sainteté et vie dans le siècle.

During his lifetime, Truhlar published around 250 articles and essays for various reviews, dictionaries, and theological encyclopedias, including Sacramentum mundi.

== Notable works ==
His theological bibliography includes:

- "De experiential mystica", Rome, 1951
- "Antinomiae vitae spiritualis" (Dialectics of Spiritual Life), Rome, 1958
- "Problemata theological de vita spirituali laicorum et religiosorum", Rome, 1960
- “Labor christianus” (For a Theology of Work), Rome, 1961
- “Christusfahrung” (Christ our Experience), Rome, 1964
- "Fuite du monde et conscience chrétienne d’aujourd’hui", Rome, 1965
- "L’ora dei laici", Torino, 1966
- "Teilhard und Solowjev". Dichtung und religiöse Erfahrung. Freiburg-München, 1966
- "Sul mondo d’oggi", Meditazioni teologiche, Brescia, 1967
- "Pokoncilski katoliški ethos" (Postconciliar Catholic Ethos), Celje, 1968
- "Katolicizem v poglobitvenem procesu" (Catholicism in Process of Deepening), Celje, 1971
- "Concetti fondamentali della teologia spirituale", Brescia, 1971
- "Lessico di spiritualità", Brescia, 1973
- "Leksikon duhovnosti", Celje, 1974

== Collections ==
- "Nova Zemlja", Buenos Aires, 1958
- "Rdeče Bivanje", Buenos Aires, 1961
- "V dnevih šumi Ocean", Celje, 1969
- "Luč iz črne prsti", Celje, 1973
- "Motnordeči glas" (posthumous), Ljubljana-Dravlje, 1979
- "Kri" (posthumous), Ljubljana-Dravlje, 1979
