= Gulfaris =

Dux Istriae Gulfaris
- Military career
- Allegiance: East Roman Empire
- Rank: magister militum

Gulfaris also Gulfari (fl. 599) was a Lombard from Istria who entered Byzantine service and became a magister militium. He was of Lombard descent, as evidenced by his name. Gulfaris is also credited as dux Istriae.

In the early Middle Ages, Lombard kings conquered and invaded Istria several times, sometimes in alliance with the Slavs, as in 601 (or 602), although the extent of their settlement of the peninsula is a matter of debate. Gulfaris was renowned for his good deeds. He might have been the same person as an Ulfari, lord of Treviso, who is known for rebelling against the Arian king Agilulf. Gulfaris is said to have opposed the Istrian supporters of the Three Chapters schism. He was called "glorious son" by Pope Gregory. Gulfaris is best known for being the subject of an epistle by Pope Gregory (Gregory to Gulfaris). In the letter the Pope compliments Gulfaris for his faith and loyalty to the apostolic church.

Gulfaris remained in Istria after the establishment of the Exarchate of Ravenna, becoming one of the several dukes of Lombard descent in the Byzantine provinces. Unlike the exarch, who was of eastern origin, the provincial commanders came from different backgrounds.
