= List of academic journals published in Slovenia =

This is a list of notable academic journals published in Slovenia.

== A ==
- Acta Chimica Slovenica
- Acta Geographica Slovenica
- Acta Geotechnica Slovenica
- Acta Histriae
- Ars Mathematica Contemporanea

== B ==
- Bogoslovni vestnik

== F ==
- Filozofski vestnik

== G ==
- Geografski Zbornik

== M ==
- Metodološki zvezki

== P ==
- Prispevki za novejšo zgodovino

== S ==
- Studia Historica Slovenica
- Studia mythologica Slavica

== T ==
- Teorija in praksa

== U ==
- Urbani izziv

== Z ==
- Zgodovinski časopis
