= Artur Gavazzi =

Artur Gavazzi (14 October 1861 – 12 March 1944) was a geographer and cartographer.

Gavazzi was born in Split (then in the Austrian Empire) and died in Zagreb (then in the Independent State of Croatia).

Gavazzi was the first professor of geography at the University of Ljubljana, where Anton Melik succeeded him. In 1928, Gavazzi went to the University of Zagreb.
