= Bogoslovni vestnik =

- Discipline: Theology
- Language: English, French, German, Italian, Latin, Slovene
- Edited by: Robert Petkovšek

Publication details
- History: 1920–1945; 1965–present
- Publisher: Faculty of Theology, University of Ljubljana (Slovenia)
- Frequency: Quarterly

Standard abbreviations
- ISO 4: Bogosl. Vestn.

Indexing
- ISSN: 0006-5722 (print); 1581-2987 (web)
- LCCN: 76525121
- OCLC no.: 439849909

Links
- Journal homepage

Bogoslovni vestnik, subtitled Theological Quarterly, Ephemerides Theologicae, is a quarterly peer-reviewed academic journal on theology published by the Faculty of Theology of the University of Ljubljana. It is the oldest Slovenian scholarly journal in the field of humanities. Articles are in English, French, German, Italian, Latin, or Slovenian. The journal is abstracted in Religious and Theological Abstracts.

== See also ==
- List of academic journals published in Slovenia
