= Urbani izziv =

- Discipline: Urban planning
- Language: English, Slovenian
- Edited by: Boštjan Kerbler

Publication details
- History: 1989-present
- Publisher: Urban Planning Institute of the Republic of Slovenia (Slovenia)
- Frequency: Biannual
- Open access: Yes

Standard abbreviations
- ISO 4: Urbani izziv

Indexing
- ISSN: 0353-6483 (print); 1855-8399 (web)
- OCLC no.: 705702640

Links
- Journal homepage; Online access; Online archive

Urbani izziv (English: Urban Challenge) is a biannual peer-reviewed academic journal published by the Urban Planning Institute of the Republic of Slovenia. It was established in December 1989 and covers all aspects of urban planning and urban studies. The journal is published in English and Slovenian.

== Structure ==
The journal is divided into two parts. The first (longer) part is titled "Articles" and includes original research, review articles, and short and technical studies. The second (shorter) part of the journal is titled "Reviews and information" and contains reviews, announcements (e.g., announcements of books, projects, events, lectures, conferences, etc.), library information, and other material. The latter part is not peer-reviewed.

== Abstracting and indexing ==
The journal is abstracted and indexed in:

- Scopus
- EBSCO databases
- ProQuest databases
- Central and Eastern European Online Library
- International Bibliography of Periodical Literature in the Humanities and Social Sciences

== See also ==
- List of academic journals published in Slovenia
