= Acta Chimica Slovenica =

- Discipline: Chemistry
- Language: English, Slovene
- Edited by: Ksenija Kogej

Publication details
- Former name(s): Vestnik Slovenskega kemijskega društva
- History: 1954–present
- Publisher: Slovenian Chemical Society (Slovenia)
- Frequency: Quarterly
- Impact factor: 1.735 (2020)

Standard abbreviations
- ISO 4: Acta Chim. Slov.

Indexing
- CODEN: ACSLE7
- ISSN: 1318-0207 (print); 1580-3155 (web)
- LCCN: 94646636
- OCLC no.: 29881395

Links
- Journal homepage; Online access

Acta Chimica Slovenica is a quarterly scientific journal of chemistry. It comprises two parts: The first part contains peer-reviewed scientific and expert articles from the various fields of chemistry, written in English and accompanied by abstracts in Slovene. The second part, written in Slovene, contains societal news: lists of newly conferred academic degrees, reports on the work of the sections of the Slovenian Chemical Society, expert articles and book reviews, and news on conferences and other meetings.

The journal and the articles published since 1998 are also available online. The journal was established in 1954 as Vestnik Slovenskega kemijskega društva and obtained its current name in 1993.

According to SCImago Journal Rank (SJR), the journal h-index is 49, ranking it to Q3 in Chemistry (miscellaneous).

== See also ==
- List of academic journals published in Slovenia
