= Zgodovinski časopis =

- Discipline: History
- Language: Slovenian, English, German
- Edited by: Peter Štih

Publication details
- History: 1947–present
- Publisher: Zveza zgodovinskih društev Slovenije (Slovenia)
- Frequency: Biannual

Standard abbreviations
- ISO 4: Zgod. Čas.

Indexing
- ISSN: 0350-5774 (print); 2536-3956 (web)

Links
- Journal homepage

Zgodovinski časopis (Historical Review) is a peer-reviewed historical academic journal. It is published by the Zveza zgodovinskih društev Slovenije, based in Ljubljana and the editor-in-chief is Peter Štih. The journal was established in 1947, with first issue published the next year.

Journal is publishing "research findings on Slovene history and articles about general and specialized questions pertaining to the history of neighboring Central European nations, general history, auxiliary historical disciplines, theory of history, and the teaching of history in schools."

== Editors-in-chief ==
Since establishing the journal, the following historians were editors-in-chief:

- Bogo Grafenauer (1947-1968),
- Ferdo Gestrin (1969-1972),
- Vasilij Melik (1973-1999) and
- Peter Štih (2000-).

== Abstracting and indexing ==
The journal is abstracted and indexed in:

- Scopus,
- International Bibliography of the Social Sciences, Historical Abstracts,
- ABC-Clio,
- America: History and Life,
- Bibliography of the History of Art,
- Ulrich's Periodicals Directory,
- Russian Academy of Sciences Bibliographies,
- European Reference Index for the Humanities (ERIH)

== See also ==
- List of academic journals published in Slovenia
- Prispevki za novejšo zgodovino
