= List of history journals =

This list of history journals presents representative notable academic journals pertaining to the field of history and historiography. It includes scholarly journals listed by journal databases and professional associations such as: JSTOR, Project MUSE, the Organization of American Historians, the American Historical Association, Goedeken (2000), or are published by national or regional historical societies, or by major scholarly publishers (such as Cambridge University Press, Oxford University Press, the University of Chicago Press and Taylor & Francis). It does not include many of the world's 5,000 journals devoted to local history or highly specialized topics. This list is a compilation and not one based on an exhaustive examination and judgment of quality.

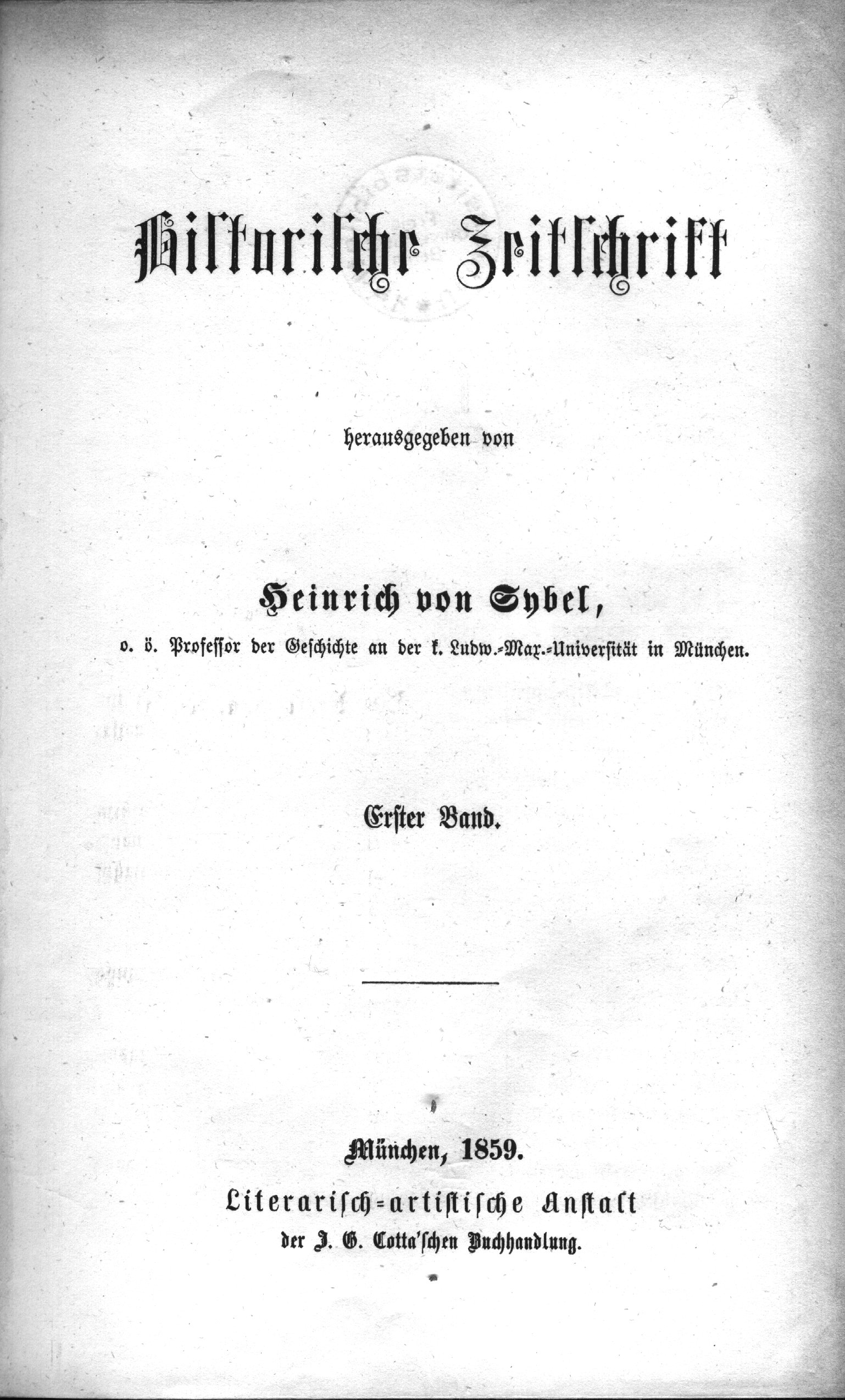
Historische Zeitschrift first issue 1859

== General history ==
- The American Historical Review
- Annales. Histoire, Sciences sociales
- Canadian Journal of History/Annales canadiennes d'histoire
- The English Historical Review
- The Historian
- The Historical Journal
- Historische Zeitschrift
- History
- History Compass
- History Today
- History Workshop Journal
- Journal of Interdisciplinary History
- Past & Present
- Radical History Review
- Revue historique
- Rivista Storica Italiana
- Studies in People's History

== By period ==
=== Classical ===
- Antiguo Oriente
- Bryn Mawr Classical Review
- Historia: Zeitschrift für Alte Geschichte – Revue d'Histoire Ancienne – Journal of Ancient History – Rivista di Storia Antica
- The Journal of Hellenic Studies
- "Semanas de Estvdios Romanos"

=== Modern and contemporary ===
- Eighteenth-Century Studies
- The Historical Journal
- Journal of Contemporary History
- The Journal of Modern History

=== Comparative and world ===
- Comparative Studies in Society and History
- Journal of World History

== By region ==
=== Africa ===
- African Archaeological Review
- African Economic History
- African Historical Review
- Afrique & Histoire
- History in Africa
- International Journal of African Historical Studies
- The Journal of African History
- Journal of Modern African Studies
- Journal of Southern African Studies
- Rhodesiana
- South African Historical Journal
- Zaïre. Revue Congolaise—Congoleesch Tijdschrift

==== Egypt ====
- Journal of the American Research Center in Egypt
- Studien zur Altägyptischen Kultur

=== Asia ===
- Asian Survey
- Central Asian Survey
- Iranian Studies
- Journal of American-East Asian Relations
- Journal of the American Oriental Society
- The Journal of Asian Studies
- Journal of the Royal Asiatic Society
- Modern Asian Studies

==== East Asia ====
- Bulletin of the National Museum of Japanese History
- Central Asian Survey
- Chinese Historical Review
- Journal of Japanese Studies
- Korean Studies
- Late Imperial China
- Monumenta Nipponica
- Chinese Studies in History
- Social Science Japan Journal
- T'oung Pao: International Journal of Chinese Studies

==== South Asia ====
- Indian Economic and Social History Review
- Indian Historical Review

==== Southeast Asia ====
- Brunei Museum Journal
- Journal of the Malaysian Branch of the Royal Asiatic Society
- Journal of Southeast Asian Studies
- SOAS Bulletin of Burma Research
- Journal of the Siam Society

=== Australasia and Oceania ===
- Aboriginal History
- Australian Economic History Review
- Australian Historical Studies
- Australian Journal of Politics and History
- Journal of the Royal Australian Historical Society
- New Zealand Journal of History
- Oceania
- Queensland History Journal
- Victorian Historical Journal

=== Europe ===
- Contemporary European History
- European History Quarterly
- European Review of History: Revue européenne d'histoire
- Historical Social Research
- Itinerario

==== Middle Ages ====
- Bibliothèque de l'École des Chartes
- Early Medieval Europe
- Journal of Medieval History
- Reti Medievali Rivista
- The Medieval Review
- Speculum: A Journal of Medieval Studies

==== Britain ====
- Albion
- Anglo-Saxon England
- Arthuriana
- British Catholic History
- The British Journal for the History of Science
- Britain and the World, formerly British Scholar
- Cambrian Medieval Celtic Studies
- Contemporary British History
- The Economic History Review
- The English Historical Review
- History Workshop Journal
- History: The Journal of the Historical Association
- Journal of British Studies
- Journal of Scottish Historical Studies, formerly Scottish Economic and Social History
- Journal of Victorian Culture
- Past and Present
- The Scottish Historical Review
- Twentieth Century British History
- Victorian Studies

===== Regional or local =====
- Oxoniensia

==== Ireland ====
- Analecta Hibernica
- Archivium Hibernicum
- Clogher Record
- Collectanea Hibernica
- Dublin Historical Record
- Eighteenth-Century Ireland
- Ériu
- The Irish Sword, formerly Journal of the Military History Society of Ireland
- Journal of the Galway Archaeological and Historical Society
- Journal of the Royal Society of Antiquaries of Ireland
- Studia Hibernica

==== Eastern Europe and Balkans ====
- Central Asian Survey
- Contemporary European History
- Harvard Ukrainian Studies
- Journal of Baltic Studies
- Journal of Modern Greek Studies
- Journal of Slavic Military Studies
- Kritika: Explorations in Russian and Eurasian History
- Kwartalnik Historyczny
- Prispevki za novejšo zgodovino
- Revolutionary Russia
- Russian History
- Slavic Review
- Slavonic and East European Review
- Soviet Studies
- The Polish Review
- The Russian Review
- The Slavic and East European Journal
- Politics, Religion & Ideology (formerly Totalitarian Movements and Political Religions)
- Zgodovinski časopis

==== Nordic Europe ====
- Historisk Tidskrift (Sweden)
- Historisk Tidskrift för Finland
- Historisk Tidsskrift (Denmark)
- Historisk Tidsskrift (Norway)
- Saga (Iceland)
- Nordic Historical Review
- Scandinavian Journal of History

==== Western Europe ====
- BMGN: Low Countries Historical Review
- Bulletin for Spanish and Portuguese Historical Studies
- Central European History
- Dutch Crossing: Journal of Low Countries Studies
- French Historical Studies
- French History
- French Studies
- German History
- German Studies Review
- Historische Zeitschrift
- Journal of Belgian History

=== Iberoamerica ===
- Revista do Instituto Histórico e Geográfico Brasileiro
- Anuario Colombiano de Historia Social y de la Cultura
- Boletín americanista
- Revista de Historia Americana y Argentina
- Hispanic American Historical Review
- Historia
- Journal of Latin American Studies
- Mexican Studies/Estudios Mexicanos
- Revista Complutense de Historia de América
- Revista Chilena de Historia y Geografía
- Boletín de la Academia Chilena de la Historia
- Semanas de Estvdios Romanos

=== Middle East ===
- Ancient Iranian Studies
- Arabic Sciences and Philosophy
- Bulletin of the American Schools of Oriental Research
- Iranian Studies
- Jerusalem Quarterly
- Journal of Near Eastern Studies
- Journal of Palestine Studies
- Palestine Exploration Quarterly

=== United States ===
- The American Genealogist
- American Quarterly
- Arkansas Historical Quarterly
- Atlanta History: A Journal of Georgia and the South
- California History
- The Chronicles of Oklahoma
- Civil War History
- Florida Historical Quarterly
- Georgia Historical Quarterly
- Harvard Law Review
- Indiana Magazine of History
- The Journal of American History (formerly Mississippi Valley Historical Review)
- Journal of American Studies
- Journal of the Early Republic
- Journal of the Gilded Age and Progressive Era
- Journal of Illinois History
- Journal of Southern History
- Journal of the Southwest
- Journal of the West
- Kansas History
- Michigan Historical Review
- Minnesota History
- Missouri Historical Review
- Montana: The Magazine of Western History
- The New England Quarterly
- Ohio History
- Oregon Historical Quarterly
- Pacific Historical Review
- Pacific Northwest Quarterly
- Pennsylvania History: A Journal of Mid-Atlantic Studies
- Pennsylvania Magazine of History and Biography
- Reviews in American History
- William and Mary Quarterly, pre-1815
- Southwestern Historical Quarterly
- Virginia Magazine of History and Biography
- Western Historical Quarterly
- Wisconsin Magazine of History
- Yale Law Journal

=== Canada ===
- Acadiensis
- Canada's History, formerly The Beaver (1920 – 2010)
- Canadian Historical Review
- Saskatchewan History

== By topic ==
=== Architectural ===
- Change Over Time

=== Archives ===
- American Archivist
- Archivaria
- Archives

=== Business, labor and economics ===
- African Economic History
- Agricultural History
- Agricultural History Review
- American Communist History
- Business History
- Business History Review
- Communisme
- Economic History Review
- Enterprise and Society
- Essays in Economic & Business History
- European Review of Economic History
- Financial History Review
- International Labor and Working Class History
- Journal of Economic History
- Labor History
- Labor: Studies in Working-Class History
- Labour/Le Travail

=== Demography and family ===
- Continuity and Change: A Journal of Social Structure, Law and Demography in Past Societies
- Journal of Family History
- Journal of the History of Childhood and Youth

=== Environment ===
- Environmental History

=== Ethnic and racial studies ===
- Amerasia Journal
- American Jewish History
- Australian Journal of Jewish Studies
- Jewish Social Studies
- Journal of African American History, formerly The Journal of Negro History (1916–2001)
- Journal of Asian American Studies

=== Food history ===
- Petits Propos Culinaires
- Food & History

=== Genocide ===
- Holocaust and Genocide Studies
- Holocaust Studies: A Journal of Culture and History
- Journal of Genocide Research
- The Journal of Holocaust Research

=== Ideas and historiography ===
- History and Theory
- History of European Ideas
- Journal of the History of Ideas
- Social Science History

=== International relations and diplomatic ===
- Diplomatic History
- Journal of American-East Asian Relations
- Cold War History
- Journal of Cold War Studies
- Journal of Conflict Resolution
- Journal of Peace Research
- Prague Papers on the History of International Relations

=== Legal ===
- American Journal of Legal History
- Revista Chilena de Historia del Derecho

=== Maritime ===
- American Neptune
- International Journal of Maritime History
- Mariner's Mirror
- Northern Mariner

=== Media and books ===
- American Literary History
- Book History
- Film & History
- The Historical Journal of Film, Radio and Television
- Huntington Library Quarterly

=== Military ===
- Journal of Military History
- The Journal of Slavic Military Studies
- Militärgeschichtliche Zeitschrift
- Journal for the Society of Army Historical Research
- War in History
- War & Society

=== Politics and public policy ===
- American Communist History
- The Journal of Legislative Studies
- Journal of Policy History
- Presidential Studies Quarterly
- The Public Historian

=== Religion ===
- American Jewish History
- Anglican & Episcopal History
- Anuario de Historia de la Iglesia
- Australian Journal of Jewish Studies
- British Catholic History
- The Catholic Historical Review
- Church History
- History of Religions
- John Whitmer Historical Association Journal
- Journal of Ecclesiastical History
- Journal of Mormon History
- Journal of Religious History
- The Mennonite Quarterly Review
- Mormon Historical Studies
- Numen
- Revue d'Histoire Ecclésiastique
- Reformation

=== Science and technology ===
- Ambix
- Annals of Science
- The British Journal for the History of Science
- Bulletin of the History of Medicine
- Centaurus
- Construction History
- Historical Studies in the Natural Sciences
- History and Technology
- IEEE Annals of the History of Computing
- Isis
- Journal for the History of Astronomy
- Journal of the History of Medicine and Allied Sciences
- Notes and Records of the Royal Society
- Osiris
- Quest: The History of Spaceflight
- The Rutherford Journal
- Technology and Culture

=== Social ===
- Historical Social Research
- History of Intellectual Culture
- History Workshop Journal
- Journal of Social History
- Social Science History

=== Teaching and methods ===
- The History Teacher
- American Educational History Journal
- Programming Historian

=== Urban ===
- Journal of Planning History
- Journal of Urban History
- Urban History

=== Women and gender studies ===
- Australian Feminist Studies
- Aspasia
- Feminist Studies
- Gender & History
- Journal of the History of Sexuality
- Journal of Women's History

== See also ==
- List of historians
- History journal
- Historiography
- List of historical societies, most of which have journals or popular magazines
- List of scientific journals
