= Papal deposing power =

Power of the pope to depose monarchs

The papal deposing power was the most powerful tool of the political authority claimed by and on behalf of the Roman Pontiff, in medieval and early modern thought, amounting to the assertion of the Pope's power to declare a Christian monarch heretical and powerless to rule.

Pope Gregory VII's Dictatus Papae (c. 1075) claimed for the Pope "that it may be permitted to him to depose emperors" (12) and asserted the papal power to "absolve subjects from their fealty to wicked men" (27).

Oaths of allegiance held together the feudal political structure of medieval Europe. The principle behind deposition was that the Pope, as the ultimate representative of God from whom all oaths draw their force, could in extreme circumstances absolve a ruler's subjects of their allegiance, thereby rendering the ruler powerless. In a medieval Europe in which all confessed the Pope as head of the visible Church, it gave concrete embodiment to the superiority of the spiritual power over the temporal—the other side, so to speak, of the role of Popes and bishops in anointing and crowning emperors and kings.

== History ==
Some prominent papal depositions:

| No. | Pope | Monarch | Monarchy | Date of deposition | Latin title of bull | Link to Latin text | English title of bull | Link to English text | Wording | Outcome | Reference |
|---|---|---|---|---|---|---|---|---|---|---|---|
| 1. | Pope Gregory VII | King Henry IV | Holy Roman Empire | February 22, 1076 | Beate Petre apostolorum princeps | | 'St. Peter, prince of the apostles' | | 'I now declare in the name of omnipotent God, the Father, Son, and Holy Spirit, that Henry, son of the emperor Henry, is deprived of his kingdom of Germany and Italy' | Excommunication lifted following the Road to Canossa. | |
| 2. | Pope Alexander III | Emperor Frederick I | Holy Roman Empire | April 4, 1160 | Pro illis tribulationibus | ^{:90–92} | 'For those tribulations' | | 'By the common counsel and will of our brethren, we absolve you all, both specially and collectively, from the fidelity which you have rendered to him, and from all debt of the empire, on the part of the Almighty God, and by the apostolic authority of the blessed apostles Peter and Paul, so that you are no longer bound to obey him in any respect' | Treaty of Venice in 1177 | |
| 3. | Pope Innocent III is said to have deposed | King John | Kingdom of England | 1212 | | | | | | | |
| 4. | Pope Gregory IX | Emperor Frederick II | Holy Roman Empire | August 20, 1228 | | | | | | | |
| 5. | Pope Innocent IV | Emperor Frederick II | Holy Roman Empire | July 17, 1245 | apostolic letter Ad Apostolicae Dignitatis Apicem | | 'Raised, though unworthy, to the highest point of the apostolic dignity' | | 'Let those whose task it is to choose an emperor in the same empire, freely choose a successor to him. With regard to the aforesaid kingdom of Sicily, we shall take care to provide, with the counsel of our brother cardinals, as we see to be expedient' | Great Interregnum | |
| 6. | Pope Innocent IV | King Sancho II | Kingdom of Portugal | July 24, 1245 | papal bull Grandi non immerito | | | | | | |
| 7. | Pope Innocent IV | King Manfred | Kingdom of Sicily | 1259 | | | | | | He was excommunicated again by Pope Urban IV in 1261 and eventually deposed and killed at the Battle of Benevento in 1266. | |
| 8. | Pope Martin IV | King Peter III | Kingdom of Aragon | March 21, 1283 | De Insurgentis | ^{:53–66} | 'The Insurgents' | | '(W)e have deprived them of all the fees, goods and rights which they may hold from the same Roman or other Churches, privileges, indulgences and grails granted to them by the same See, under any form of words, by apostolic authority; their vassals shall be bound by the oath of fidelity, by which they may be held by the same penitents.' | The crown was offered to Charles of Valois but the crusade against Aragon was unsuccessful. | |
| 8. | Pope Martin IV | Emperor Michael VIII | Byzantine Empire | March 21, 1283 | De Insurgentis | ^{:53–66} | 'The Insurgents' | | '(W)e have deprived them of all the fees, goods and rights which they may hold from the same Roman or other Churches, privileges, indulgences and grails granted to them by the same See, under any form of words, by apostolic authority; their vassals shall be bound by the oath of fidelity, by which they may be held by the same penitents.' | There had been attempts to restore the Latin Empire before but the War of the Sicilian Vespers (which triggered the bull) thwarted any plans. | |
| 9. | Pope Boniface VIII intended to depose | King Philip IV | Kingdom of France | September 8, 1303 | Super Petri solio | ^{:182–186} | 'Upon Peter alone' | | | | |
| 10. | Pope John XXII | King Louis IV | Holy Roman Empire | March 23, 1324 | Urget nos caritas sponse Christi | ^{:692–699} | | | | Louis IV would later be crowned emperor by the Roman people and install the antipope Nicholas V but Louis IV had to abandon Rome following a crusade. A second crusade failed to depose him and he stayed in power to his death. | |
| 11. | Pope Urban VI | Queen Joanna I | Kingdom of Sicily (Naples) | May 11, 1380 | Dilectis filiis, populo, et universis Civibus Sorane Civitatis. | ^{:287f.} | 'To the beloved sons, the people, and all the citizens of city Sora.' | | '(W)e deprived her of whatever dignities, and honors, and kingdoms, and lands, which she obtained from the said Romans, and from any other Churches, and from the Roman Empire, and from any others; if they had sworn to the same Joanna, fealty, or bomage, or any other duty […] we absolved and decreed absolute' | Charles of Durazzo conquered Naples but he himself got excommunicated in 1385. | |
| 12. | Pope Julius II 'drew up a bull deposing' | King Louis XII | Kingdom of France | March 20, 1512 | Dilecte fili, salutem et apostolicam benedictionem | | 'My beloved son, health and apostolic benediction' | | | | |
| 13. | Pope Pius V | Queen Elizabeth I | Kingdom of England | February 25, 1570 | Regnans in Excelsis | | 'He that reigneth on high' | | '([W]e declare) her to be deprived of her pretended title to the ... crown and of all lordship, dignity and privilege whatsoever' | | |
| 14. | Pope Sixtus V | King Henry III | Kingdom of Navarre | September 9, 1585 | Ab immensa aeterni regis | | 'The authority given to St. Peter and his successors' | Extracts from it are available at | '[W]e deprive them and their posterity for ever, of their dominions and kingdoms' | | |
| 15. | Pope Urban VIII | Duke Odoardo Farnese | Duchy of Parma | January 13, 1642 | | | | | | Odoardo was officially deprived of all his fiefs but the war continued and the pope had to lift the excommunication in 1644. | |

There are cases where the pope invested an anti-king:

| No. | Pope | Monarch | Anti-king | Monarchy | Date of coronation | Wording | Outcome | Reference |
|---|---|---|---|---|---|---|---|---|
| 1. (Note: Example before the Dictatus papae.) | Pope Formosus | Emperor Lambert | Arnulf of Carinthia | Holy Roman Empire | February 22, 896 | 'I swear by all these mysteries of God here present that, reserving only my own honor and law, and my loyalty due to the pope, Formosus, I am now, and all my life I shall be, faithful to the Emperor Arnulf. Never will I conspire against him in company of any other man; never will I aid Lambert, or Agiltrude his mother, to attain honor of this world [i.e.: imperial power]; nor will I through any device or argument deliver to either of them this city of Rome.' | Arnulf took Rome and was crowned emperor but left after suffering a stroke. Formosus died the same year and his papacy was declared invalid after the Cadaver Synod. | |
| 2. | Pope Innocent III | Emperor Otto IV | Frederick I of Sicily | Holy Roman Empire | September 1211 | | Otto IV was excommunicated on 18 November 1220 which caused princes to leave his side. His opponents elected Frederick as anti-king with papal backing. After the Battle of Bouvines in 1214, Otto's influence collapsed and Frederick was crowned king in 1215 in Aachen and crowned emperor in 1220. | |
| 3. | Pope Innocent IV | Emperor Frederick II | Henry Raspe | Holy Roman Empire | May 22, 1246 | | Great Interregnum; died in 1247 | |
| 4. | Pope Innocent IV | Emperor Frederick II | William II of Holland | Holy Roman Empire | October 3, 1247 | | Great Interregnum; undisputed king 1254–1256 | |
| 5. | Pope Innocent IV | King Conrad I | Edmund of Lancaster | Kingdom of Sicily | May 14, 1254 | | The Sicilian business was ended in 1263 when the papacy searched for a new candidate to replace the Hohenstaufen. | |
| 6. | Pope Clement IV | King Manfred | Charles I of Anjou | Kingdom of Sicily | January 5, 1266 | | Manfred was defeated and killed at the Battle of Benevento later that year. | |
| 7. | Pope Martin IV | King Peter III | Charles of Valois | Crown of Aragon | 1284 | | The Aragonese Crusade failed and Charles renounced his claims in 1295 with the Treaty of Anagni. | |
| 8. | Pope Urban VI | Queen Joanna I | Charles of Durazzo | Kingdom of Sicily (Naples) | 1381 | | Charles conquered Naples and ordered the murder of Joanna I. He himself got excommunicated in 1385. | |
| 9. | Antipope Clement VII | King Charles III | Louis I of Anjou | Kingdom of Naples | May 30, 1382 | | Originally, Louis was installed as Duke of Calabria on March 3, 1382 and the goal was to restore Joanna I of Naples. Louis died in 1384 but the war was continued for decades by their successors either ending with either the Aragonese conquest or the Italian Wars more than a century later. | |
| 10. | Pope Boniface IX | King Sigismund | Ladislaus of Naples | Kingdom of Hungary | August 5, 1403 | | With papal backing, Ladislaus was crowned in Zara but Sigismund was able to suppress the uprising. Sigismund had to abandon Bohemia allowing Wenceslaus to regain control. | |
| 11. | Pope Martin V | Queen Joanna II | Louis III of Anjou | Kingdom of Naples | December 4, 1419 | | Louis was named by the pope as the heir to Naples without the consent of Joanna II. Louis used this claim to act as a pretender to the throne against Joanna II. Joanna II was forced adopt Alfonso V of Aragon. Eventually, Louis became the undisputed heir of Joanna II but he died before her so she appointed his brother René of Anjou shortly before her own death. Alfonso V rejected this and deposed René which was followed by the Italian Wars. | |
| 12. | Pope Alexander VI | King Frederick | Louis XII of France | Kingdom of Naples | June 25, 1501 | | Apulia and Calabria was set to go to the Catholic Monarchs of Spain. The coalition collapsed starting the Third Italian War. | |
| 13. | Pope Julius II 'drew up a bull deposing' | King Louis XII | Henry VIII of England | Kingdom of France | March 20, 1512 | | Never officially confirmed. | |

== Later historical reception ==
=== Roger Widdrington ===
The Oath of Allegiance (1606) formulated for James I of England contained a specific denial of the deposing power. It triggered the Catholic Roger Widdrington's opposition to the unconditional acceptance by Catholics of the deposing power. Widdrington instead used the language of probabilism from moral theology, claiming that the deposing power was only a 'probable' doctrine, not a matter of faith.

=== Archbishop Thomas Maria Ghilini ===
In a letter to the Archbishops of Ireland dated 14 October 1768, the papal legate at Brussels, Archbishop Thomas Maria Ghilini, wrote that "the doctrine [that 'no faith or promise is to be kept with heretics, or princes excommunicated; or that Princes deprived by the Pope, may be deposed or murdered by their subjects, or by any other person whatsoever'] is defended and maintained by most Catholic nations, and has been often followed in practice by the Apostolic See. It cannot therefore upon any account be declared 'detestable and abominable' by a Catholic, without incurring, by such declaration, the imputation of a proposition, rash, false, scandalous, and injurious to the Holy See."

In a meeting at Thurles in 1776, the bishops of Munster "with the exception of Dr. MacMahon of Killaloe, who absented himself, passed sentence on the Hibernia Dominicana and its supplement [in which Ghilini's letter of 1768 had been printed], giving our entire disapprobation of them, because they tend to weaken and subvert that allegiance, fidelity, and submission, which we acknowledge ourselves we owe from duty and from gratitude to his Majesty King George III., because they are likely to disturb the public peace and tranquillity, by raising unnecessary scruples in the minds of our people, and sowing the seeds of dissensions amongst them, in points in which they ought, both from their religion and their interest, to be firmly united; and because they manifestly tend to give a handle to those who differ in religious principles with us, to impute to us maxims that we utterly reject, and which are by no means founded in the doctrines of the Roman Catholic Church."

=== Contestation by the bishops of Munster ===
In 1774 "[t]he Munster bishops drew up a declaration repudiating the papal deposing power and denying that the Pope had any civil or temporal authority in Ireland. This was accepted by most of the Catholic clergy and was made into an oath set out in Act of Parliament in 1774. It is significant that the bishops did not consult the Pope." "[W]hile deploring the terms of the oath, the Congregation of Propaganda considered it prudent not to condemn it lest it increase the hatred of Protestants and the difficulties of Catholics. But the faithful were to be privately warned against it."

An English translation of the text of the letter from the Propaganda dated 6 January 1776 appeared in Collectanea Hibernica in 1968. The translator refers to the recipient as Bishop Troy of Ossory. However, Bishop Troy was not appointed until 16 December 1776. His predecessor Bishop Thomas Burke had died on 25 September 1776. The translation is entitled "Copy of an Instruction sent to Bishop Troy of Ossory by Stefano Borgia, secretary of the Congregation of Propaganda, 6 Jan. 1776". After noting the letter from the Bishop of Ossory, the letter states: "the views put forward by Troy deserve the highest commendation of the Holy See [...] whoever takes the oath in its present form affirms, with God as his witness, that he denounces and rejects the opinion that the pope has power to free subjects from an oath of loyalty taken by them to their rulers, despite the fact that almost all the old theologians [...] and general councils supported this teaching [...] such an opinion infringes greatly on the rights of the Holy See". The letter continues "[N]evertheless, if the present formula were declared impious and inadmissable by the Holy See and if the pope issued letters to that effect, as did Paul V, it is feared that such a mode of action would [...] be fraught with danger and do more harm than good to the catholics [...] in the present circumstances the approach used by the Holy See for the past century or so must be continued; in other places, and particularly in Holland, certain forms of oaths have been prescribed by the civil authorities [...]; the Holy See has not formally approved of such forms, nor has it condemned them publicly; the same approach is advisable in the case of the Irish catholics; although the former hostility shown by the protestants towards the catholics [...] appears to have died down somewhat, there is a danger that a public declaration concerning the oath would arouse old hatreds and draw down the displeasure of the civil authorities on the Holy See, [...] consequently, the circumstances and the time must be taken into consideration" The letter concludes: "[N]evertheless, although the Holy See may refrain from issuing a formal public decree against the oath, it does not automatically follow that the formula is to be accepted; nor does it mean that it is not right for the bishops [...] to dissuade their subjects from taking such a dangerous and obnoxious oath; indeed, it is their duty to admonish the faithful, especially in private conversations with them [...]; these arc the directions which the Congregation considers it opportune to send you in accordance with the intentions of the pope."

The original Latin text was printed in Analecta Hibernica in 1946. It states that the letter was signed by Giuseppe Maria Castelli, Cardinal Prefect and by Stephanus Borgia, Secretary. "When Archbishop Butler of Cashel had too hastily renounced the deposing power, and his example was followed so hastily by others, that it was too late to retract, he received from the sacred congregation of Propaganda a letter of Rebuke, because he had presumed to transact a business so momentous, without previously advising with the Court of Rome" The letter stated: "Your duty and the usual respect due to His Holiness seemed to require that you should not have determined anything in a business of such magnitude, without first consulting the sovereign pontiff [...] It was this that gave no small pain to his Holiness and this sacred congregation"

=== Cardinal Leonardo Antonelli ===
In a rescript dated 23 June 1791, addressed to the Catholic archbishops and bishops of Ireland by Cardinal Leonardo Antonelli by the authority and command of Pope Pius VI, it was stated: "The See of Rome never taught that Faith is not to be kept with the Heterodox: that an Oath to Kings separated from Catholic Communion can be violated: that it is lawful for the Bishop of Rome to invade their temporal rights and dominions. We do consider an attempt or design against the life of Kings and Princes, even under the pretext of Religion, as a horrid and detestable crime."

=== Pope Pius VII ===
In 1805, Pope Pius VII stated in a letter to the Papal Nuncio at Vienna that "[T]he Church […] had moreover established, as the penalty of the crime of heresy, the confiscation and loss of all property possessed by heretics. This penalty […] as far as concerns sovereignties and fiefs […] is a rule of the canon law (Note: Decretals of Gregory IX, commissioned in the year 1230) cap. Absolutus XVI de Haereticis, that the subjects of a Prince manifestly heretical are released from all obligation to him, dispensed from all allegiance and all homage. To be sure we are fallen into such calamitous times, that it is not possible for the spouse of Jesus Christ to practice, nor even expedient for her to recall, her holy maxims of just rigour against the enemies of the faith. But, although she cannot exercise her right of deposing heretics from their principalities"

=== Henry Edward Manning ===
In 1860 Henry Edward Manning, who later became Archbishop of Westminster and a Cardinal, wrote, "That vast chimera at which the English people especially stand in awe, the deposing power of the Pope, what was it but that supreme arbitration whereby the highest power in the world, the Vicar of the Incarnate Son of God, anointed to be high priest, to be the supreme temporal ruler, sat in his tribunal, impartially to judge between nation and nation, between people and prince, between sovereign and subject; and that deposing power grew up by the providential action of God in the world, and it taught subjects obedience, and princes clemency." In The Vatican Decrees in their bearing on Civil Allegiance, published in 1874, Cardinal Manning wrote: "I affirm that the deposition of Henry IV. and Frederic II. of Germany were legitimate, right, and lawful; and I affirm that a deposition of Queen Victoria would not be legitimate, nor right, nor lawful, because the moral conditions which were present to justify the deposition of the Emperors of Germany are absent in the case of Queen Victoria; and therefore such an act could not be done."

=== The Tablet, December 1874 ===
The issue of The Tablet (owned by the future Cardinal Vaughan) for 5 December 1874 stated: "It is true that St. PETER never used the deposing power, but that was because Christendom had not yet begun to exist; it is equally true that neither Pius IX., nor any of his successors, are ever likely to use it, but that is because Christendom has ceased to exist [...] But if Christendom should ever be restored, which does not seem likely, we profess our unhesitating conviction that the deposing power of GOD'S Vicar would revive with it." The issue of the same publication for 12 December 1874 contained a letter from Charles Langdale (born 1822) stating: "In common with many of my contemporaries I have, more than once, taken the Catholic oath, a portion of which runs as follows :—'And I do further declare that it is not an article of my Faith [...] that Princes excommunicated or deprived by the Pope, or any other authority of the See of Rome, may be deposed or murdered by their subjects, or by any person whatsoever; and I do declare that I do not believe the Pope of Rome [...] hath, or ought to have, any temporal or civil jurisdiction, power, superiority, or preeminence, directly or indirectly, within this realm. [...]' I cannot, therefore, agree with the writer of the article in question, when he says, "we (Catholics) firmly believe that the Deposing Power [...] is manifestly included among the gifts of Peter." In the issue of the same publication for 19 December 1874, the writer of the article' wrote: "Mr. Langdale 'regrets' my observations on the Deposing Power because he and others have taken an oath that they do not believe it. We have, therefore, on one side, the Popes who actually used this power, the Christian nations who obeyed, and the great theologians who justified it; and, on the other, Mr. Langdale's oath. This hardly seems to constitute an equation. It is all on one side, and nothing on the other."

=== 1910 New Catholic Dictionary ===
In the words of the 1910 New Catholic Dictionary: "Present day popes have no mind to resuscitate their deposing power. As Pius IX said to the deputation of the Academia of the Catholic Religion on 21 July 1871: 'Although certain Popes have at times exercised their deposing power in extreme cases, they did so according to the public law then in force and by the agreement of the Christian nations who reverenced in the Pope the Supreme Judge of Christ extended to passing judgment even civiliter on princes and individual states. But altogether different is the present condition of affairs and only malice can confound things and times so different.'" Pius IX had excommunicated King Victor Emmanuel II of Italy in 1860 when Victor Emmanuel accepted the annexation of Romagna, and Victor Emmanuel had captured Rome from Pius in 1870.

=== 1913 Catholic Encyclopedia ===
The 1913 Catholic Encyclopedia's article on English Post-Reformation Oaths states: "In later days some people might think [the deposing power] out of date, inapplicable, extinct, perhaps even a mistake" and that by the time of James I of England, "the discipline of papal deposition for extreme case of misgovernment [...] would never be in vogue again, even in Catholic countries."

== See also ==
- Caesaropapism
- Civil allegiance
- Crusade against the Hohenstaufen
- Divine right of kings
- Hierocracy (medieval)
- Investiture Controversy
- Roman question
