= Astrid Friis =

Danish historian

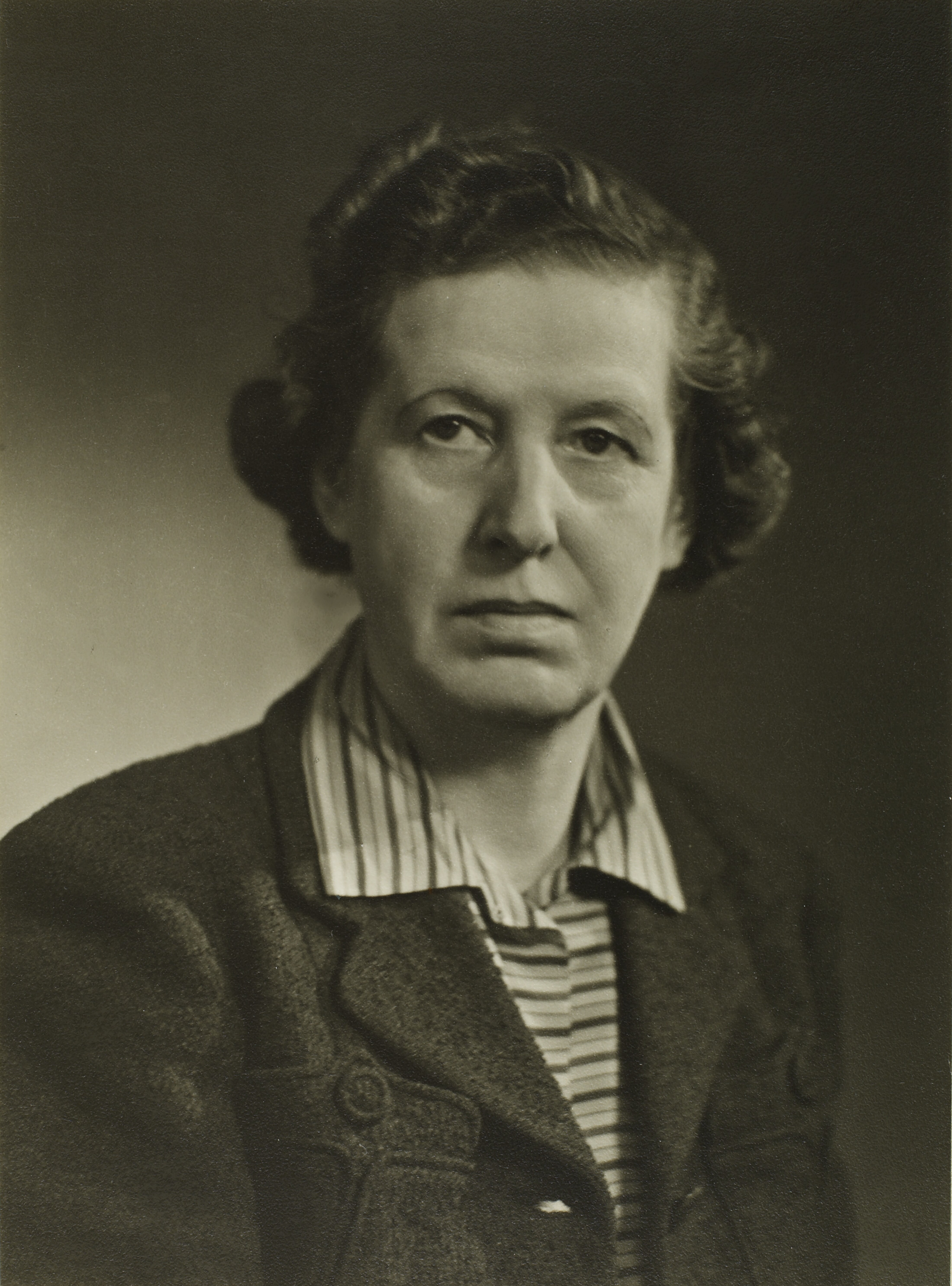
Astrid Friis

Astrid Friis (1893–1966) was a Danish historian. In 1945, she was appointed professor of history at the University of Copenhagen, so becoming the first female professor in a Danish university. She was immediately recognized as an outstanding researcher with the publication in 1927 of her seminal work on Alderman Cockayne's project and the cloth trade which examined the history of trade and commerce in 17th-century Britain. She later turned to Danish history writing biographies of officials and merchants from the 16th and 17th centuries. From 1942, she edited the Danish Journal of History.

== Early life and education ==
Born in Lemvig on 1 August 1893, Astrid Friis was the daughter of the engineer Ludvig Christian Friis (1864–1932) and his wife Ane née Fuglsang (1870–94). Her mother died while she was an infant and her father emigrated to Australia a few years later, leaving his two daughters to be brought up by their paternal grandmother and two unmarried aunts. Thanks to an inheritance left by her maternal grandfather, a successful brick factory owner, Friis was able to complete her education at Karen Kjær's School in 1913 and study history at the University of Copenhagen where she earned a master's degree in 1920.

After first studying under Kristian Erslev, under the guidance of Erik Arup, she decided to become a historian. It was thanks to Arup that she developed interest in British economic history, carrying out extensive research in London. In September 1927, she earned a Ph.D. with her thesis Alderman Cockayne's Project and the Cloth Trad: The Commercial Policy of England in Its Main Aspects, 1603–1625. As a result, her reputation was immediately established among British historians, as all the reviews of her book were positive. Writing in the Economic History Review in 1929, the historian R. H. Tawney commented: "Alderman Cockayne's Project and the Cloth Trade, by Miss Astrid Friis, is one of the most important books which have appeared in English on the economic history of the 17th century."

== Career ==
After her Ph.D., Friis was able to earn a living from the articles she wrote for the Danish National Biography on 16th- and 17th-century merchants and officials as well as the articles she wrote for the Encyclopaedia Britannica. From 1942, she served as an editor of the Danish Journal of History.

Her application in 1939 for a professorship in history at Aarhus University was not accepted, no doubt because the institution was not ready to admit a woman to the post. It was not until 1946 that she was finally appointed professor of history at the University of Copenhagen, so becoming Denmark's first female professor. There she carried out research on prices and wages in Denmark, publishing her findings in Volume I of A History of Prices and Wages in Denmark (1660–1800) in collaboration with Kristof Glamann.

Astrid Friis died in Copenhagen on 31 July 1966.
