= Ellen Jørgensen =

Danish historian and librarian (1877–1948)

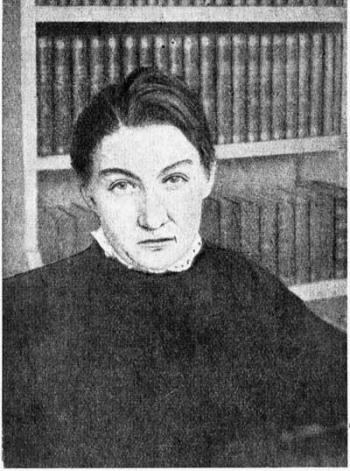
Ellen Jørgensen (1915)

Ellen Sophie Rasmine Jørgensen (1877–1948) was a Danish historian and librarian. She is remembered internationally for her authoritative books on Danish historiography, including Historieforskning og Historieskrivning i Danmark intil Aar 1800 (1931). Her earlier doctorate thesis Helgendyrkelse i Danmark i Middelalderens senere Tid provides a detailed, well-sourced account of the church and scholarly history of Denmark and Europe in the Late Middle Ages. In addition to heading the Manuscript Department of the Royal Danish Library, from 1924 to 1931 Jørgensen was the first woman to serve as editor of the journal Historisk Tidsskrift.

== Biography ==
Born in Copenhagen on 6 March 1877, Ellen Sophie Rasmine Jørgensen was the daughter of the carpenter Hans Christian Jørgensen (1847–82) and his wife Catherine Cecilie Marie née Quortrop (1853–1928). After her father's death when she was five, she developed a close relationship with her mother who helped her to develop her interest in history. While at N. Zahle's School, her teachers stimulated her interest even further. After matriculating, from 1896 she studied history at the University of Copenhagen where she was influenced by Kristian Erslev's interest in meticulous sourcing and Johannes Steenstrup's wide international experience of various fields of history.

After first specializing in modern English history, she turned to Denmark in the middle ages with Helgendyrkelse i Danmark i middelalderens senere lid which earned her the university's gold medal in 1905. In 1908, with Fremmed Indflydelse under den danske Kirkes tidligste Udvikling which covered foreign influences on the early Danish church, she earned a second gold medal which allowed her to travel and visit a number of foreign libraries. This led to her extension of Helgendyrkelse i Danmark to cover the entire middle ages which she defended as her thesis for a Ph.D. As a result, in 1909 she became the second Danish woman to earn a doctorate in history, following in the footsteps of Anna Hude.

As she was unable to obtain a permanent post at the university, she became a librarian at the Royal Library in 1915 where she headed the Manuscripts Department until her retirement in 1941. She published a number of historiographical works, the most important of which are Historieforskning og Historieskrivning i Danmark intil Aar 1800 (1931) and Historiens Studium i Danmark i det 19. Aarhundrede (1943), still considered to be Denmark's most authoritative works in the field.

Ellen Jørgensen died in Copenhagen on 14 June 1948 and was buried in the city's Assistens Cemetery.
