= The Historian (journal) =

- Discipline: History
- Language: English
- Edited by: Kees Boterbloem

Publication details
- History: 1938–present
- Publisher: Taylor & Francis on behalf of Phi Alpha Theta (United States)
- Frequency: Quarterly

Standard abbreviations
- ISO 4: Historian

Indexing
- ISSN: 0018-2370 (print); 1540-6563 (web)
- OCLC no.: 1713899

Links
- Journal homepage; The Historian at Phi Alpha Theta

The Historian is a history journal published quarterly by Taylor & Francis on behalf of the history honor society, Phi Alpha Theta. The journal was established in 1938. The Historian publishes original articles and book reviews in all areas of historical scholarship.

== Abstracting and indexing ==
The journal is abstracted and indexed in EBSCO, Arts and Humanities Citation Index, ATLA Religion Database, Current Contents/Arts & Humanities, Historical Abstracts, InfoTrac, ProQuest, Worldwide Political Sciences Abstracts.

== See also ==
- List of history journals
