= Michael J Hannafin =

American professor and academic (died 2020)

Michael J. Hannafin
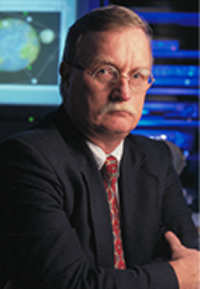
- Hannafin in 2007
- Died: 2020
- Known for: Work in educational technology

Michael J. Hannafin (died 2020) was an American professor and academic known for his work in educational technology. He was a professor at the University of Georgia in the educational psychology department and director of the Learning and Performance Support Lab. He was once editor-in-chief of the journal Educational Technology Research and Development.

After starting his career working as a school psychologist, he received a Ph.D. in educational technology from Arizona State University in 1981. He went on to work at the University of Colorado, Pennsylvania State University, and Florida State University, before moving to the University of Georgia in 1995. Along with Kyle Peck, he developed the field of computer-aided instruction as distinguished from computer-based instruction.

== Early life and education ==
Hannafin obtained a Bachelor of Science in psychology with a minor in education from the Fort Hays State University in May 1972. Two years later in August 1974 he further obtained a Master's of Science in educational/school psychology from the same university. Seven years later, in August 1981, he completed his Ph.D. in educational technology.

== Career and research ==
In 1989, Hannafin became a professor at Florida State University. In 1992 and 1993, Hannafin was a visiting professor at the United States Air Force Academy. In 1995, Hannafin moved to the University of Georgia. He received the AERA SIG- IT Best Paper Award in 2007.

== Bibliography ==
=== Selected journal publications ===
- Lee, E., & Hannafin, M. J. (2016). A design framework for enhancing engagement in student-centered learning: Own it, learn it, and share it. Educational Technology Research and Development, 64(4), 707-734.
- Shen, Y,. & Hannafin, M.J. (2013) Scaffolding preservice teachers’ higher-order reasoning during technology integration. Journal of Technology & Teacher Education , 21(4), 433–459.
- West, R., & Hannafin, M.J. (2011). Learning to design collaboratively: Participation of students designers in a community of innovation. Instructional Science, 39(6), 821–841.
- Kim, H., & Hannafin, M.J. (2011) Scaffolding problem solving in technology –enhanced learning environments: Bridging research and theory with practice. Computers & Education. 56(2) 403–417.
- Kim, M. C., & Hannafin, M. J. (2011). Scaffolding problem solving in technology-enhanced learning environments (TELEs): Bridging research and theory with practice. Computers & Education, 56(2), 403–417.
- Kim, M. C., & Hannafin, M. J. (2011). Scaffolding 6th graders' problem solving in technology-enhanced science classrooms: A qualitative case study. Instructional Science, 39(3), 255–282.
- Polly, D., & Hannafin, M.J. (2010). Reexamining technology's role in learner-centred professional development. Educational Technology Research & Development, 58(5) 557–572
- Hannafin, M.J., Shepherd, C., & Polly, D. (2010). Video assessment of classroom teaching practices: Lessons learned, problems & issues. Educational Technology, 50(1), 32–37.
- Glazer, E.., Hannafin, M.J., Polly, A., & Rich, P . (2009) Factors and interactions influencing technology integration during situated professional development in elementary schools. Computers in schools 26, 21–39.
- Kim, M. C., Hannafin, M. J., & Bryan, L. A. (2007). Technology-enhanced inquiry tools in science education: An emerging pedagogical framework for classroom practice. Science Education, 91(6), 1010–1030.
- Hannafin, M. J., Orrill, C. H., Kim, H., & Kim, M. C. (2005). Educational technology research in postsecondary settings: Promise, problems, and prospect. Journal of Computing in Higher Education, 16(2), 3–22.
- Iiyoshi, T., Hannafin, M. J., & Wang, F. (2005). Cognitive Tools and Student- Centered Learning: Rethinking Tools, Functions and Applications, Educational Media International, 42(4), 281–296.
- Kim, M. C., & Hannafin, M. J. (2004). Designing online learning environments to support scientific inquiry. Quarterly Review of Distance Education, 5(1), 1–10.
- Hannafin, M. J., Kim, M. C., & Kim, H. (2004). Reconciling research, theory, and practice in Web-based teaching and learning: The case for grounded design. Journal of Computing in Higher Education, 15(2), 3–20.
- Hannafin, M. J., & Kim, M. C. (2003). In search of a future: A critical analysis of research on Web-based teaching and learning. Instructional Science, 31, 347–351.
- Hannafin, M.J. (1997). The technology Paradox: Or, can your horse to the moon? Access, Fall, 2,5
- Hannafin, M.J., (1989) The death of educational technology has been greatly exaggerated. Canadian Journal of Educational Communication, 18, 140–142
- Dalton, D., Hannafin, M.J., & Hooper, S. (1989). The effects of cooperative versus individualized instructional strategies on learning from based instruction. Educational Technology Research and Development, 37, 15–24
- Hannafin, M.J. (1988). Review of interactive media: Working methods and practical applications. Instructional Science, 17, 189–190
- Hannafin, M. J. (1987). The effects of orienting activities, cueing, and practice on learning from computer-based instruction. Journal of Educational Research, 81, 48–53.

=== Selected published books ===
During the period 1974 to 2016 Hannafin wrote and co-authored over 84 books, chapters and monographs including the award-winning text book The Design, Development, and Evaluation of Instructional Software. Some of his co-authors include Peck, Polly, Barrett, Cole and Wisemen. Some of his selected books are:

- Hannafin, M. J., Hill, J. R., Land, S. M., & Lee, E. (2013). Student-centered, open learning environments: Research, theory, and practice. In Handbook of research on educational communications and technology (pp. 641–651). New York, NY: Springer New York.
- Hannafin, M.J., Kim, H., & Chang, Y. (2014). The role of video in Web-enhanced case-based learning: Promises, Challenges and potential in teacher learning research. In Q. Lang & W. Qiyun (Eds) Designing Technology- Mediated Case Learning in Higher Education: A Global Perspective. New York: Springer.
- Hannafin, M.J. (2012). Student-centered learning. In N. Seel(Ed), Encyclopedia of the sciences of learning (Part 19, 3211-3214) New York: Springer.
- Hill, J. R., Domizi, D. P., Kim, M. C., & Kim, H., Hannafin, M. J. (2007). Teaching and learning in negotiated and informal environments. In M. Moore (Ed.), Handbook of distance education (2nd ed., pp. 271–284). Mahwah, NJ: Erlbaum (now Routledge).
- Kim, M. C., & Hannafin, M. J. (2007). Foundations and practice for Web-enhanced science inquiry: Grounded design perspectives. In R. Luppicini (Ed.), Online learning communities: A volume in perspectives in instructional technology and distance education (pp. 53–72). Greenwich, CT: Information Age Publishing.
- Hannafin, M.J. & Hannafin K. M. (1995). The status and future of research in instructional design and technology revisited. In G. Anglin (Ed.) Readings in Instructional Technology (2nd Ed, pp. 314–321) Littleton, CO: Libraries Unlimited.
- Hill, J., Domzi, D., Kim, M., Kim, H.,& Hannafin, M.J. (2007). Teaching and learning in negotiated and informal environments. In M.Moore(Ed.), Handbook of Distance Education (2nd ED) (pp. 271–284) Mahwah, NJ: Erlbaum.
- Choi, J-I., & Hannafin, M.J. (1995). Situated cognition and learning environments: Roles, structures, and implications for design. Educational Technology Research and Development.
- Hannafin, M.J., Hall, C., Land, S., & Hill, J. (1994). Learning in open-ended environments: Assumptions, methods, and implications. Educational Technology, 34(8), 48–55.
- Hannafin, M.J. (1992). Emerging technologies, ISD, and learning environments: Critical perspectives. Educational Technology Research and Development, 40(1), 49–63.
- Hooper, S., & Hannafin, M.J. (1991). Psychological perspectives on emerging instructional technologies: A critical analysis. Educational Psychologist, 26, 69–95.
- Hannafin, M.J., & Peck, K.L. (1988). The design, development, and evaluation of instructional software. New York: Macmillan.
- Hannafin, M.J.(1985). Review of Mathematics Anxiety Rating Scale. In J. Mitchell (ED.), The Ninth Mental Measurements Yearbook (pp. 909–911) Buros Institute of Mental Measurements.
- Peck, K.L., & Hannafin, M.J. (1987). Reconsidering technology in the classroom: Some immodest proposals. In M. Dupuis (Eds.) Issues in Teacher Education monograph series (pp. 37–61). (Division of Curriculum Instruction, College of Education, The Pennsylvania State University).
- Hannafin, M.J. (1986). Special education assessment: A systems approach. In D. Wodrich and J. Joy (Eds.), Multidisciplinary Assessment (pp. 77–108).New York: Brookes Publishing Co.
