= Historisk Tidsskrift (Denmark) =

History magazine in Denmark

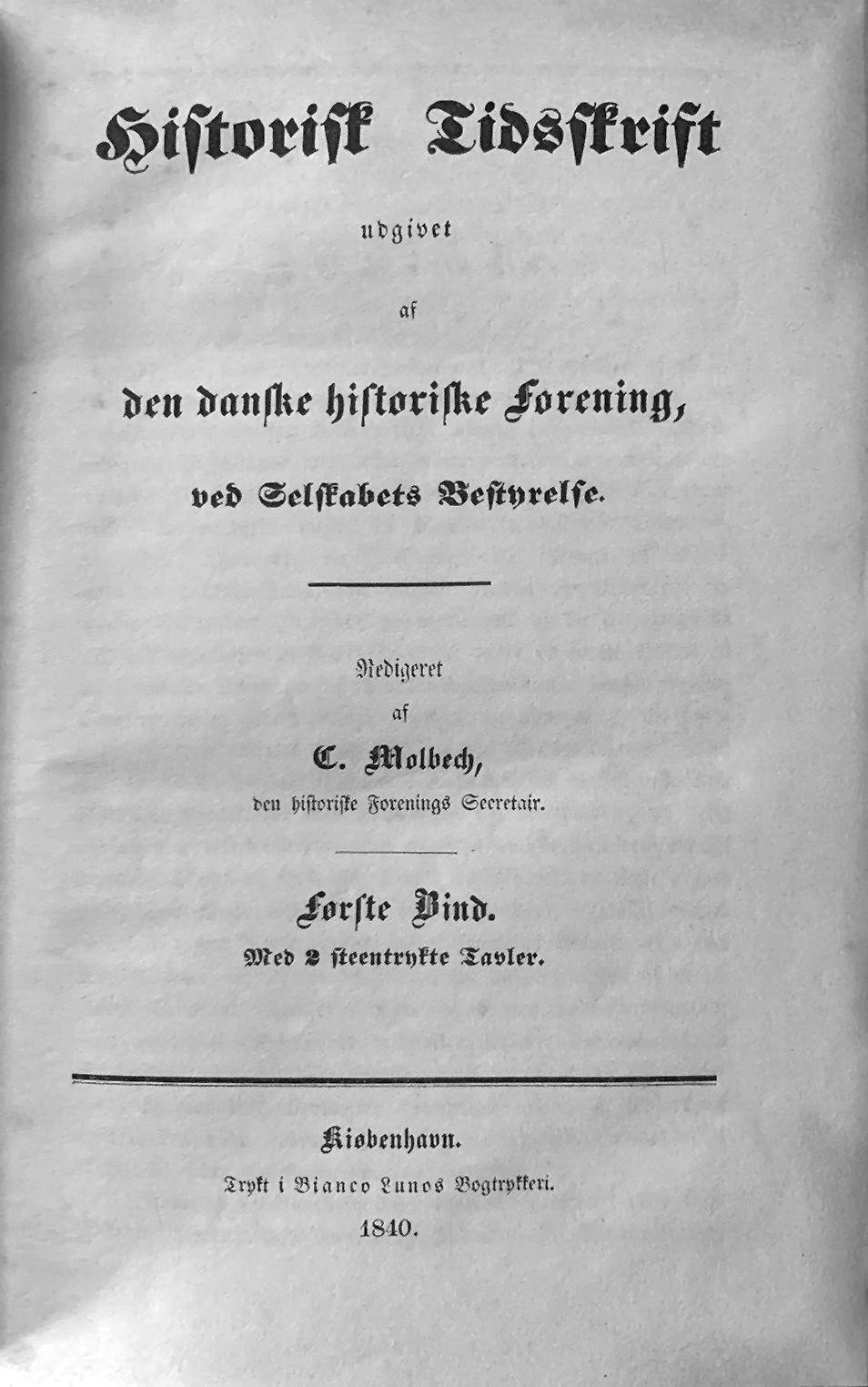
- Title page of the first issue of "Historisk Tidsskrift", 1840
- Categories: History magazine
- Frequency: Biannual
- Founded: 1840; 186 years ago
- Company: Danish Historical Association
- Country: Denmark
- Based in: Copenhagen
- Language: Danish
- Website: http://www.historisktidsskrift.dk/
- ISSN: 0106-4991
- OCLC: 175313559

Historisk Tidsskrift is a Danish history journal established in 1840 with the founding of the Danish Historical Society in the same year. It is the oldest extant national journal for history.

== History and profile ==
Historisk Tidsskrift was first published in 1840. The Danish Historical Association is the owner of the magazine.

The magazine is published in two fascicles each year. The first editor was Christian Molbech. Since 1973, it has always had two editors.

== List of editors ==
- 1839–1853: Christian Molbech
- 1853–1865: Niels Ludvig Westergaard
- 1865–1878: Edvard Holm
- 1878–1897: Carl Frederik Bricka
- 1897–1912: Julius Albert Fridericia
- 1912–1917: Kristian Erslev
- 1917–1924: Erik Arup
- 1924–1932: Ellen Jørgensen
- 1932–1942: Axel Lindvald
- 1942–1965: Povl Bagge and Astrid Friis
- 1965–1973: Svend Ellehøj
- 1973–1982: Inga Floto and Erling Ladewig Petersen
- 1982–1988: Hans Kirchhoff
- 1982–1989: Esben Albrectsen
- 1988–2006: Carsten Due-Nielsen
- 1989–2003: Anders Monrad Møller
- 2004–2013: Jan Pedersen
- 2006–2013: Regin Schmidt
- 2014-2023: Jes Fabricius Møller
- 2014- : Sebastian Olden-Jørgensen
- 2023- : Joachim Lund

== See also ==
List of magazines in Denmark
