= Philip Norton, Baron Norton of Louth =

English author, academic and life peer (born 1951)

The Right Honourable The Lord Norton of Louth FRSA FAcSS FRHistS
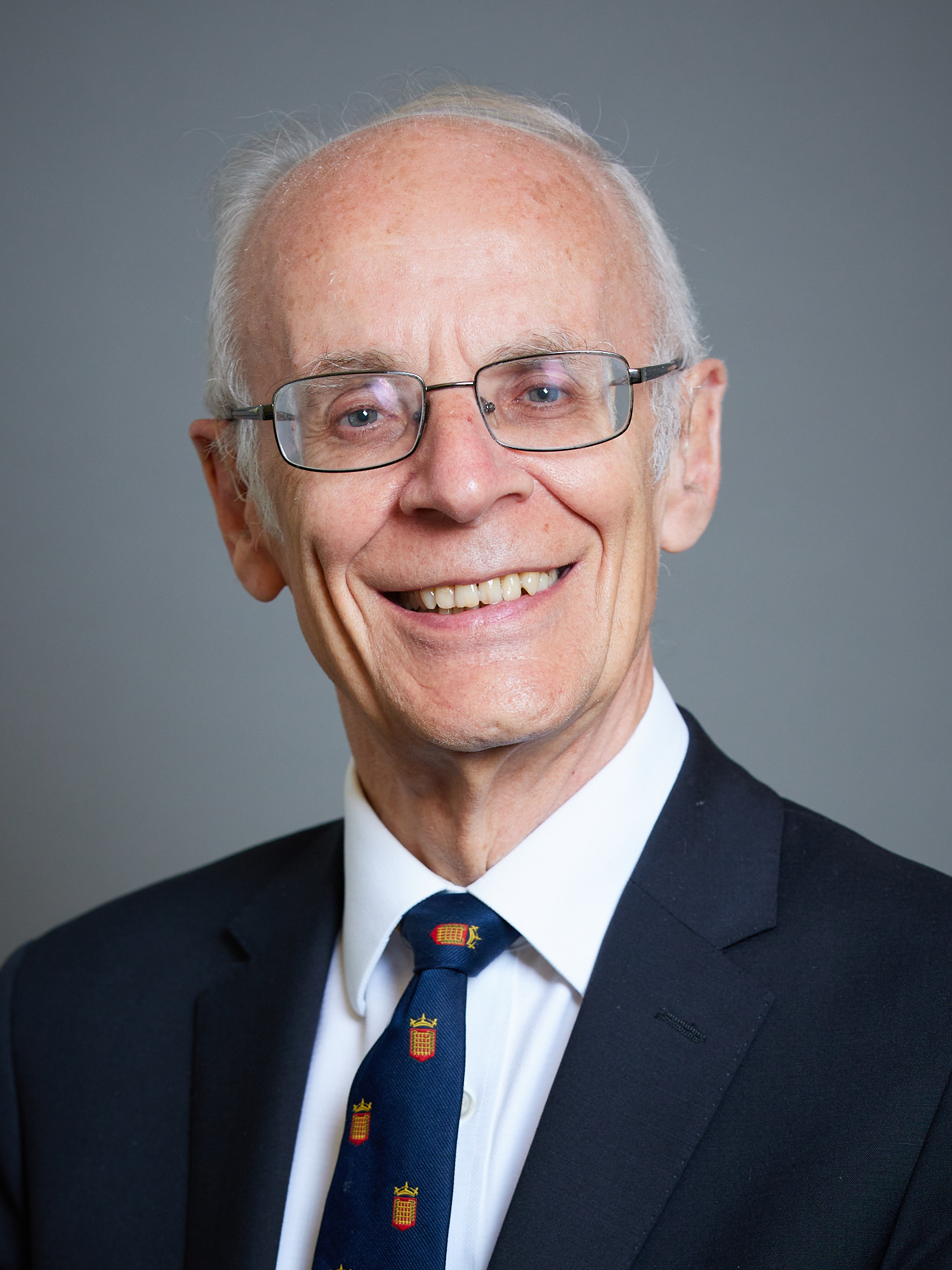
- Official portrait, 2022

Member of the House of Lords
- Lord Temporal
- Life peerage 1 August 1998

Personal details
- Born: Philip Norton; 5 March 1951 (age 75) Louth, England
- Party: Conservative
- Education: University of Sheffield (BA, PhD); University of Pennsylvania (MA)
- Occupation: Academic

Philip Norton, Baron Norton of Louth, FRSA, FAcSS, FRHistS (born 5 March 1951), is an English author, academic and Conservative life peer. He has sat in the House of Lords since 1998. He has been described as "the United Kingdom's greatest living expert on Parliament" and "a world authority on constitutional issues".

== Education ==
The son of George Ernest Norton, Philip Norton was educated at King Edward VI Grammar School in Louth, where he now sits as a governor and Warden of the School. He graduated from the University of Sheffield with the degree of Bachelor of Arts and later as a Doctor of Philosophy, and, after winning a Thouron Award, from the University of Pennsylvania with a Master of Arts degree.

== Career ==
Norton is a professor of government in the Department of Politics and International Studies at the University of Hull, and was head of the department from 2002 to 2007. Norton's early work is notable for having spearheaded the academic discussion on dissidence in the House of Commons with the publication of his first book in 1975. He was made a professor at the university in 1986, making him the UK's youngest professor of politics at the time at the age of 36.

Since 1992, he has been the director of the Centre for Legislative Studies. Since 1988, Norton has been responsible for the university's "Westminster-Hull Internship Programme" (WHIP), a placement scheme which pairs students with some of the UK's top politicians. Norton is the founder and editor of The Journal of Legislative Studies, most recently editing its 25th anniversary publication: The Impact of Legislatures: A Quarter-Century of The Journal of Legislative Studies. He has also been the chair of the Conservative Academic Group since 2000. Norton has also previously served as president of the British Politics Group in the US, and the Politics Association.

Norton chaired the Standards Committee of the City of Hull from 1999 to 2003. In 2016, he was made an Honorary Freeman of the City of Kingston-Upon-Hull.

He was created a life peer with the title Baron Norton of Louth, of Louth in the County of Lincolnshire on 1 August 1998. In 2000, he chaired a commission for Leader of the Opposition William Hague to design ideas for the strengthening of the institution of Parliament, and from 2001 to 2004 he served as the first Conservative chairman of the House of Lords Constitution Committee. Since 2013, Norton has chaired the Higher Education Commission.

In 2007, The Daily Telegraph named him the 59th most influential person on the right of British politics.

Norton has contributed to Lords of the Blog, a collaborative blog by members of the House of Lords for the purposes of public engagement. The Guardian has described him as "a new star of the blogosphere." He has been a Fellow of the Royal Society of Arts since 1995 and the Royal Historical Society since 2018. Lord Norton also has a personal blog in which he often cites some of the many evolving responsibilities he undertakes in political and academic circles. For example, Norton has served as co-chair of the Committee on Higher Education since 2012. He is convenor and co-founder of the Campaign for an Effective Second Chamber: a group which reinforces the utility of the House of Lords as a democratic institution. The campaign argues in favour of the experience and expertise of peers in delivering legislative amendments, scrutiny and effective debate, with recognition that such functions are, at present, fulfilled. The campaign disputes the creation of an elected House of Lords, due to the absence of basic accountability such a format would enable. Since 2020, Norton has served as the chair of The History of Parliament Trust and since 2019 has served as president of the Study of Parliament group. Norton founded and organises the biennial Workshop of Parliamentary Scholars and Parliamentarians, which draws scholars and parliamentarians from around the world.

Norton has a quiz on the Lords of the Blog and also often has caption competitions on his personal blog. The Norton View attracts readership from around the world.

Norton is an Ambassador for Akt, a charity that supports LGBTQ+ individuals aged 16–25 who are rendered homeless.

== Arms ==
Norton was granted a coat of arms in 1998 upon his ennoblement.

Coat of arms of Philip Norton, Baron Norton of Louth
Coronet A Coronet of a Baron. Crest A church tower argent with a spire azure set thereon a bee or the wings displayed argent veined azure. Escutcheon Paly of four argent and or issuing in base a pile throughout the sides embowed inwards azure over all three fleurs-de-lis those in chief azure and that in base per pale argent and or. Supporters On either side an owl azure armed or in the beak a quill the nib outwards argent spined or.

== Fellowships ==
- Fellow of the Royal Society of Arts (FRSA), 1995
- Fellow of the Academy of Social Sciences (FAcSS; previously Academician, AcSS), 2001
- Fellow of the Royal Historical Society (FRHistS), 2018

== Honorary academic degrees ==
- Hon LLD, Lincoln University, 2011
- Honorary Senior Fellow, Regent's University, 2019

== Bibliography ==
- Dissension in the House of Commons: Intra-party Dissent in the House of Commons' Division Lobbies, 1945–1974, Macmillan, 1975, ISBN 978-1-3490-2561-9
- Conservative Dissidents: Dissent within the Parliamentary Conservative Party, 1970–1974, Temple Smith, 1978, ISBN 978-0-8511-7163-0
- Dissension in the House of Commons 1974–1979, Oxford University Press, 1980, ISBN 978-0-19-827430-8
- The Commons in Perspective, Longman, 1981, ISBN 978-0-582-28294-0
- The Constitution in Flux, Martin Robertson, 1982, ISBN 978-0-85520-521-8
- The Political Science of British Politics, (with Jack Hayward) Wheatsheaf Books, 1986, ISBN 0-7450-0367-2
- Politics UK, (with Bill Jones) Taylor & Francis (Routledge), 1991 (1st ed.), 2018 (8th ed. with Bill Jones & Oliver Daddow), ISBN 978-1-1386-8508-6
- The British Polity, Longman, 2000 (1st ed.), 2010 (5th ed.), ISBN 978-0-8013-1844-3
- Parliament in British Politics, Palgrave Macmillan, 2005 (1st ed.), 2013 (2nd ed.) ISBN 978-1-4039-0667-0
- The Voice of the Backbenchers: The 1922 Committee: The first 90 years, 1923–2013, Conservative History Group, 2013, ISBN 978-1-9051-1611-9
- Reform of the House of Lords, Manchester University Press, 2017, ISBN 978-1-5261-1923-0
- Governing Britain: Parliament, ministers and our ambiguous constitution, Manchester University Press, 2020, ISBN 978-1-5261-4545-1

Orders of precedence in the United Kingdom
Preceded by The Lord Clarke of Hampstead	Gentlemen; Baron Norton of Louth	Followed by The Lord Ahmed
