= Martha Saxton =

American historian (1945–2023)

- Born: Martha Porter Saxton; September 3, 1945; New York City, U.S.
- Died: July 18, 2023 (aged 77); Norfolk, Connecticut, U.S.

Academic background
- Education: Columbia University, University of Chicago

Academic work
- Discipline: History
- Sub-discipline: Women's studies, gender studies
- Institutions: Amherst College

Martha Porter Saxton (September 3, 1945 – July 18, 2023) was an American professor of history and women's and gender studies at Amherst College who authored several prominent historical biographies.

== Life ==
Martha Porter Saxton was born in Manhattan on September 3, 1945. Her parents worked in the publishing industry. She graduated from Columbia University, and University of Chicago.

Saxton taught at Amherst College, and Hampshire County Jail and House of Correction.

In 2003, she wrote Being Good: Women's Moral Values in Early America. The TV film The Jayne Mansfield Story featuring Loni Anderson and Arnold Schwarzenegger was based on her book Jayne Mansfield and the American Fifties.

Saxton also published findings of a classroom experiment on Wikipedia's inclusion of women in historical articles. In her course, "Women's History 1865-Present," Saxton guided students as they identified Wikipedia articles that would benefit from additional information regarding women's involvement in a given topic (e.g. the Shaker movement). Students conducted academic research on the topic of their choosing and then revised Wikipedia pages accordingly. She was a recipient of the PEN New England Award.

Martha Saxton died of lung cancer at her home in Norfolk, Connecticut, on July 18, 2023, at the age of 77.

== Publications ==
=== Books ===
- The Widow Washington: The Life of Mary Washington (Farrar, Straus and Giroux, 2019). ISBN 9780809097012, OCLC 1081339249
- Editor, Amherst in the World (Amherst College, 2020). ISBN 9780943184203 Open Source, ISBN 9780943184210 Print.
- Being Good: Women's Moral Values in Early America (Hill and Wang, 2003). ISBN 9780374110116, OCLC 50645380
- Interpretations of American History (seventh edition) with Frank Couvares (previously edited by Gerald Grob and George Billias), Free Press, Spring 2000.
- Louisa May Alcott: A Modern Biography (Houghton Mifflin, 1977) (Avon, 1978; Farrar Straus & Giroux, 1995). ISBN 9780374524609, OCLC 928246371
- Jayne Mansfield and the American Fifties (Houghton Mifflin, 1976) (Bantam, 1976). ISBN 9780553025569, OCLC 74376010

=== Essays, reviews, and other ===
- "Lives of Missouri Slave Women: A Critique of true Womanhood," in eds. Manisha Sinha and Penny Von Eschen, Contested Democracy: Freedom, Race and Power in American History, Columbia U. Press, 2007.
- "Curing Gender Amnesia," Women's Review of Books 24.1 (Jan Feb 2007): 24.
- "Masquerade: the Life and Times of Deborah Sampson, Continental Soldier," by Alfred Young, in The William and Mary Quarterly, forthcoming.
- "River Gods-and Goddesses. Women's Review of Books 21.9 (June 2004): 10.
- "Neither Lady Nor Slave," The S.C. Historical Magazinheae, October 2004.
- "La Formazione degli Stati Uniti," Journal of American History, February, 2004.
- "Sexism and the City," Journal of Urban History, January, 2003.
- "Examining our Revolutionary Baggage," Reviews in American History, December, 2000
- "The Moral Minority, Prescriptive Literature in Early St. Louis," Gateway-Heritage, The Quarterly Magazine of the Missouri Historical Society (Fall 2000): 18–31.
- "Women Without Rights," in Not for Ourselves Alone, ed. by Geoffrey C. Ward and Ken Burns (New York: A. A. Knopf, Inc., 1999), 52–57.
- "Puritan Women: The Seeds of a Critical Tradition," History Today, 44.10 (Sept./Oct. 1994): 28–33.
- "Civil War Nurses," in The Face of Mercy, A Photographic History of Medicine at War, ed. by Matthew Naythons, and William Styron (San Francisco: Epicenter, 1993).

== Awards and honors ==
- Whiting Travel Fellowship, 2012
- Cullman Fellow, New York Public Library, 2007–2008
- Doshisha Lecturer, Doshisha University, Kyoto, Japan (2006)
- Miner D. Crary Award, Amherst College (2000-2001)
- Bunting Fellow, Radcliffe College (1995-1996)
- Mellon Fellow, Society of Fellows in the Humanities, Columbia (1988-1990)
- Lane Cooper Award, Columbia (1987-1988)
- Mary Ellen Shimke Award, Wellesley College (1986-1987)
- Presidential Fellow, Columbia (1985–88)
- Boston Globe Annual Award for Louisa May Alcott (1977)

== Scholarly and professional activities ==
- Member, Authors' Guild
- Member, PEN, Secretary of PEN Executive Board, 1986-1989
- Member, PEN/Martha Albrand Award Committee, 1992
- Member, Willie Lee Rose Prize Committee, 1996 (Southern Association for Women's Historians)
- Member, Julia Spruill Prize Committee, 1999 (Southern Association for Women's Historians)
- Member, Louis Pelzer Memorial Award Committee, AHA, 2005-6
- Co-founder and co-editor of The Journal of the History of Childhood and Youth, with Laura Lovett
