= Minnesota History (journal) =

American journal of history

- Discipline: Minnesota history
- Language: English
- Edited by: Amy Boxrud

Publication details
- Former name: Minnesota History Bulletin
- History: 1915–present
- Publisher: Minnesota Historical Society Press (United States)
- Frequency: Quarterly

Standard abbreviations
- ISO 4: Minn. Hist.

Indexing
- ISSN: 0026-5497 (print); 2327-9230 (web)
- LCCN: 85652033
- JSTOR: 00265497
- OCLC no.: 977573215

Links
- Journal homepage; Online archive

Minnesota History (formerly Minnesota History Bulletin and sometimes called Minnesota History Magazine) is a quarterly peer-reviewed academic journal published by the Minnesota Historical Society Press focusing on the history of the US state of Minnesota and the adjacent area. Published since 1915, the journal is edited by Amy Boxrud and written for a non-specialist audience, with free distribution to all members of the state historical society. Among US state historical journals, Minnesota History has been regarded throughout its run for the quality of its scholarship and the caliber of the authors publishing in it.

== Overview and history ==
The journal is published quarterly by the Minnesota Historical Society (MNHS). The journal covers topics related to various facets of Minnesota history, as well as the history of adjoining areas. Articles in the journal are intended to be understandable by lay audiences, may vary between 1,500 and 5,000 words, and undergo a double-blind peer-review process before publication. In addition to articles, the journal features book reviews, biographies, and information on the MNHS's collections. The journal's current editor-in-chief is Amy Boxrud, who moved to MNHS after serving 15 years at Norwegian-American Historical Association. The journal's editor-in-chief was previously Laura Weber, who took over from Anne R. Kaplan in 2016. The MNHS occasionally refers to the journal as the Minnesota History Magazine.

The first issue of the journal was published in February 1915 under the title Minnesota History Bulletin, authorized by MNHS superintendent Solon J. Buck. The Bulletin was intended to disseminate information presented at MNHS meetings or submitted to the society in a more timely manner than the previous method of collecting papers and notes for several years at a time, then publishing them in a larger single volume. Beginning with its March 1925 issue, the journal changed its name to Minnesota History, which the MNHS felt reflected the journal's shifting aims: to include more popularly accessible content and to provide materials for teachers of Minnesota history. The journal is also illustrated.

Among state historical journals, Minnesota History has been well-regarded throughout its print run. The Bulletin was noted in The Mississippi Valley Historical Review shortly after its founding for being among the best local and state historical journals in terms of the quality of its news and notes. In 1932, the publication was described by the Review of Reviews and World's Work as being an "able and important" US state historical periodical. Upon its fiftieth anniversary, a review in the Journal of the Illinois State Historical Society described the "high level of historical quality" within Minnesota History. Another in the Wisconsin Magazine of History described the journal as an exemplar to other state historical societies, for the caliber of its scholarship and of the scholars who contributed to the journal, suggesting that a similar journal should have been established in neighboring Wisconsin much sooner.

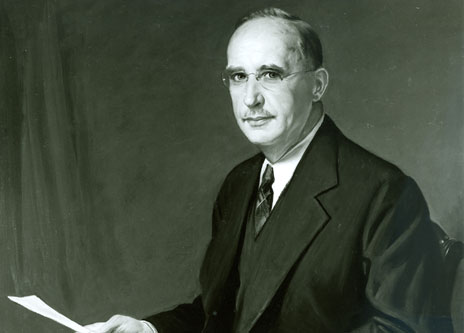
Solon J. Buck, namesake of one of the journal's two annual prizes

Each year, Minnesota History presents the Solon J. Buck Award for the best article published in the journal in the preceding 12 months. The award was first given in 1955 and is open to all contributors to the journal who are not MNHS staff. A second award, the Theodore C. Blegen Award, was established in 1971 and is open to all contributors to the journal who are MNHS employees. As of 2019, the value of the cash prize for both awards was $600.

== Distribution and availability ==
Issues of Minnesota History are distributed for free to members of the MNHS. Beginning in 2009, the MNHS began publishing full issues of Minnesota History on its website, initially with a five-year delay and, beginning in 2017, concurrent with their print publications. The journal is also available through JSTOR.

== Abstracting and indexing ==
The journal is abstracted and indexed in America: History and Life, Historical Abstracts, and the Modern Language Association Database.

== Topics ==
The journal articles cover a range of topics of Minnesota history, including the Sioux people and the Dakota War of 1862, the historical importance of the Saint Anthony Falls, the history of cholera in the state, the historic Near v. Minnesota Supreme Court case, and root beer stands in the Upper Midwest.

== See also ==
- List of history journals § United States
