= Persica Antiqua =

Academic journal on ancient Iran

- Discipline: Archaeology, History, Iranian Studies
- Language: English
- Edited by: Shahin Aryamanesh

Publication details
- History: 2021–present
- Publisher: Tissaphernes Archaeological Research Group (Iran)
- Frequency: Semiannual
- ISO 4: Find out here

Indexing
- ISSN: 2783-2732 (print); 2783-2295 (web)

Links
- Journal homepage

Persica Antiqua is a scholarly journal publishing papers on ancient Iran.

The journal was established by Shahin Aryamanesh, faculty member of Institute for Humanities and Cultural Studies in 2021. The journal covers studies on the culture and civilization of pre-Islamic Persia in its broadest sense. Persica Antiqua publishes on Persian Studies, including archaeology, ancient history, linguistics, religion, epigraphy, numismatics, and the history of art of ancient Iran, as well as on cultural exchanges and relations between Persia and its neighbours.

This journal is published in English by Tissaphernes Archaeological Research Group. The journal is edited by Shahin Aryamanesh.

Persica Antiqua is an open access journal and was indexed in Scopus on 30 March 2023. CiteScore of this journal is 1.0 on scopus in 2024. The journal achieved Q1 rank in the latest Scimago rankings in 2025.
