= American Educational History Journal =

- Discipline: History of education
- Language: English
- Edited by: Donna M. Davis

Publication details
- Former name(s): Annual Proceedings of the Midwest History of Education Society
- History: 1973-present
- Publisher: Information Age Publishing on behalf of the Organization of Educational Historians (United States)
- Frequency: Biannually

Standard abbreviations
- ISO 4: Am. Educ. Hist. J.

Indexing
- ISSN: 1535-0584 (print); 1535-0584 (web)
- LCCN: 2001213789
- OCLC no.: 891381828, 961063772 747411390, 891381828, 961063772

Links
- Journal homepage; ERIC (ED474155); ProQuest Lib Central

The American Educational History Journal is a biannual peer-reviewed academic journal covering the history of education in the United States. It is published by Information Age Publishing on behalf of the Organization of Educational Historians. Authors are scholars in areas closely related to the educational field, such as curriculum, history, philosophy, teacher education, and educational leadership. The editor-in-chief is Donna M. Davis.

From 1973 to 2001 it was published as the Annual Proceedings of the Midwest History of Education Society, which was replaced by the peer-reviewed American Educational History Journal in 2002. Also, From 1999 to 2003 it was published annually. Since 2004, it has been published biannually.

== Abstracting and indexing ==
The journal is abstracted and indexed in the following bibliographic databases: Historical Abstracts, America: History and Life, Education Research Complete, and the Education Resources Information Center.
