= Persian World (journal) =

- Discipline: Archaeology, History, Iranian Studies
- Language: English, Persian
- Edited by: Shahin Aryamanesh

Publication details
- History: 2024–present
- Publisher: Tissaphernes Archaeological Research Group (Iran)
- Frequency: Semiannual

Standard abbreviations
- ISO 4: Persian World

Indexing
- ISSN: 3092-7102 (print); 3092-7110 (web)

Links
- Journal homepage

Persian World is a scholarly journal publishing papers on Iran.

Persian World scope includes all areas of the world with an Iranian or Persian legacy, Iran, Tajikistan, Afghanistan, the Indian Subcontinent, Transoxiana, the Caucasus, and Asia Minor.

Persian World is an open access journal and was indexed in Scopus on 5 March 2026.

This journal is published in English, and Persian, by Tissaphernes Archaeological Research Group.
