= Laura L. Lovett =

American historian (1963–2025)

- Born: February 2, 1963; Pensacola, FL
- Died: March 4, 2025 (aged 62); Pittsburgh, PA
- Education: University of California, Berkeley
- Occupation: Professor
- Known for: Women's History, History of Childhood and Youth
- Spouse: Michael R. Dietrich

Laura L. Lovett was an American historian, and Professor of History at the University of Pittsburgh, where she was also the Director of the Gender, Sexuality, and Women's Studies Program. From 2008 until 2013 she served as the co-editor-in-chief for the Journal of the History of Childhood and Youth.

== Education and career ==
Lovett graduated from the University of California, Los Angeles in 1986 with degrees in English literature and history. She then earned an M.A. from the University of California, San Diego in 1990. She earned her PhD at University of California, Berkeley in 1998 where she studied agrarianism and reform among women in late 19th century and early 20th century for her dissertation.

She was a faculty member at the University of Tennessee, Chattanooga, Dartmouth College, and the University of Massachusetts before moving to the University of Pittsburgh in 2018. Lovett has been a fellowship committee member of the American Historical Association who spoke out against government censorship of historical debate.

== Work ==
Lovett's scholarship addressed different dimensions of women's political action in the twentieth century. Lovett's early work concerned the histories of eugenics, pronatalism, and ideals of American home and family. She had produced historical studies of the transformative power of Black women's activism in the 1960s and 1970s at the local, national, and transnational level. Her 2021 book, With Her Fist Raised: Dorothy Pitman Hughes and the Transformative Power of Community Activism, is a biography of Dorothy Pitman Hughes, an influential activist and organizer in New York City beginning in the 1960s. Although she is best known now for speaking with Gloria Steinem, Hughes created a community child care center that became a model for community based organizing in the 1970s, among many other causes that she has championed.

Lovett was also the founding co-editor of the Journal of the History of Childhood and Youth, which she started with Martha Saxton, Karen Sanchez-Eppler, and Brian Bunk in 2008; she remained as editor until 2013. In 2012, she co-edited with Lori Rotskoff a collection of essays appraising the impact of the children's book, record, and TV show, Free to Be... You and Me. This set of essays features essays from the book's creators, the children who grew up with it; historians and sociologists of childhood; and social activists, cultural critics, and producers of children's media today.

== Selected publications ==
- With Her Fist Raised: Dorothy Pitman Hughes and the Transformative Power of Community Activism. Boston, MA: Beacon Press. 2021. ISBN 978-080700889-8.
- Conceiving the Future: Pronatalism, Reproduction, and the Family in the United States, 1890–1930. Chapel Hill, NC: University of North Carolina Press. 2007. ISBN 978-0-8078-5803-5.
- Laura L. Lovett; Lori Rotskoff, eds. (2012). When We Were Free to Be: Looking Back at a Children's Classic and the Difference It Made. Chapel Hill, NC: University of North Carolina Press. ISBN 978-0-918393-18-0.
- Laura L. Lovett; Rachel Jessica Daniel; Kelly N. Giles, eds. (2022). "It's Our Movement Now": Black Women's Politics and the 1977 National Women's Conference. Gainesville, FL: University Press of Florida. ISBN 9780813069487.
- "Eugenic Housing: Redlining, Reproductive Regulation, and Suburban Development in the United States," Women's Studies Quarterly 48 (2020), 76–83.
- "The Popeye Principle: Selling Child Health in the First Nutrition Crisis," Journal of Health Politics, Policy, and Law 30 (2005) 803–838.
- "'African and Cherokee By Choice': Race and Resistance Under Legalized Segregation," American Indian Quarterly 22 (1998), 203–229.
