= Tissaphernes Archaeological Research Group =

Tissaphernes Archaeological Research Group is a research group focused on the archaeology of Iran. The group, which is based in Tehran, Iran, was established by Iranian archaeologist Shahin Aryamanesh.

== Publications ==
A full list of the publications of the institute (journals, series, monographs) is accessible online.

Tissaphernes Archaeological Research Group produces some of the most important Iranian Studies journals.

- Persica Antiqua
- Ancient Iranian Studies
- Sinus Persicus
- Caspian
- Persian World

== Events ==
The group organized several conference on the iranian studies.

1. National Conference of the Persian World in Median & Achaemenid Period, 11 July 2024.
2. National Conference of the Persian World in Seleucid & Parthian Period, 16 February 2025.
3. National Conference of the Persian World in Sasanian & Post-Sasanain Period, 12 October 2025.
4. National Conference of the Persian World: Persian Gulf, and Gulf of Oman (Makran)
