= Irish Manuscripts Commission =

Commission of the government of Ireland

- Parent company: Government of Ireland
- Founded: 1928
- Country of origin: Ireland
- Headquarters location: Dublin
- Distribution: Gill
- Publication types: Books, journals
- Nonfiction topics: manuscripts
- Official website: www.irishmanuscripts.ie

The Irish Manuscripts Commission was established in 1928 by the newly founded Irish Free State with the intention of furthering the study of Ireland's manuscript collections and archives. Its foundation was primarily motivated by the loss of many historical documents when the Irish Public Record Office was destroyed during the Battle of Dublin in the Irish Civil War, and by the destruction of most Irish family records by the IRA at the Burning of the Custom House in 1920.

The Commission catalogues and publishes editions of such documents. It also publishes the journal Analecta Hibernica, which provides information on the commission's work and editions of shorter manuscripts. Since 1930 it has overseen the publication of over 140 titles.

The commission is run by a chairman and a board appointed by the Irish government. The commission's works were published by the Irish Stationery Office (now the Government Supplies Agency) until 1990. Since 1991 it has published its own works.

The Irish Manuscripts Commission is based at 45 Merrion Square, Dublin 2. It shares a building with the Irish Architectural Archive.

The commission's first chairman on its foundation was Eoin MacNeill. Among its first board members was Richard Irvine Best. The current chair is James McGuire of University College Dublin.

In 2008, the Government of Ireland announced its intention to amalgamate the commission, the National Archives of Ireland and National Library of Ireland as part of a wide-ranging programme of cut-backs. The announcement proved highly controversial, with Fintan O'Toole and Donnchadh Ó Corráin among the most vocal opponents of the measure. This merger, in the end, did not go ahead.
