= Phi Alpha Theta =

American history honor society

- ΦΑΘ
- Founded: March 17, 1921; 105 years ago University of Arkansas
- Type: Honor
- Affiliation: ACHS
- Status: Active
- Emphasis: History
- Scope: National
- Motto: "Seek Truth"
- Colors: Madonna Blue; Madonna Red; Gold
- Flower: Red rose
- Publication: The Historian
- Chapters: 970
- Members: 9,000 active 400,000+ lifetime
- Headquarters: 134 Whitaker Road, Suite A Lutz, Florida 33549; United States
- Website: www.phialphatheta.org

Phi Alpha Theta (ΦΑΘ) is an American honor society for undergraduate and graduate students and professors of history. It was created in 1921 at the University of Arkansas in Fayetteville, Arkansas. It has more than 400,000 members, with new members numbering about 9,000 a year through its 970 chapters.

== History ==
Nels Andrew N. Cleven, a professor of history at the University of Arkansas, played an active role in fraternity and sorority social affairs and became inspired by the structure of those groups to create a society for historical study. Cleven invited students to a meeting to form what was then called the University Historical Society on March 14, 1921, establishing the society on March 17, 1921. In April, the decision was made for the society to be known by the Greek letters Phi Alpha Theta.

== Symbols ==
The description of the society's emblem is precise: The emblem of the Society is a gold disc, "with the edge milled to represent a serpent's body, the forepart of the serpent's body being on the right side of the badge, and the eye shall be represented by a red jewel." On the face is a raised six-pointed star faced with black, "and bearing in gold the Greek letters Phi Alpha Theta horizontally across the middle, and the points bearing the Greek letters "Ψ, Π, Α, Λ, Υ, and Ψ" in clockwise rotation beginning at the uppermost point." The emblem can be jeweled.

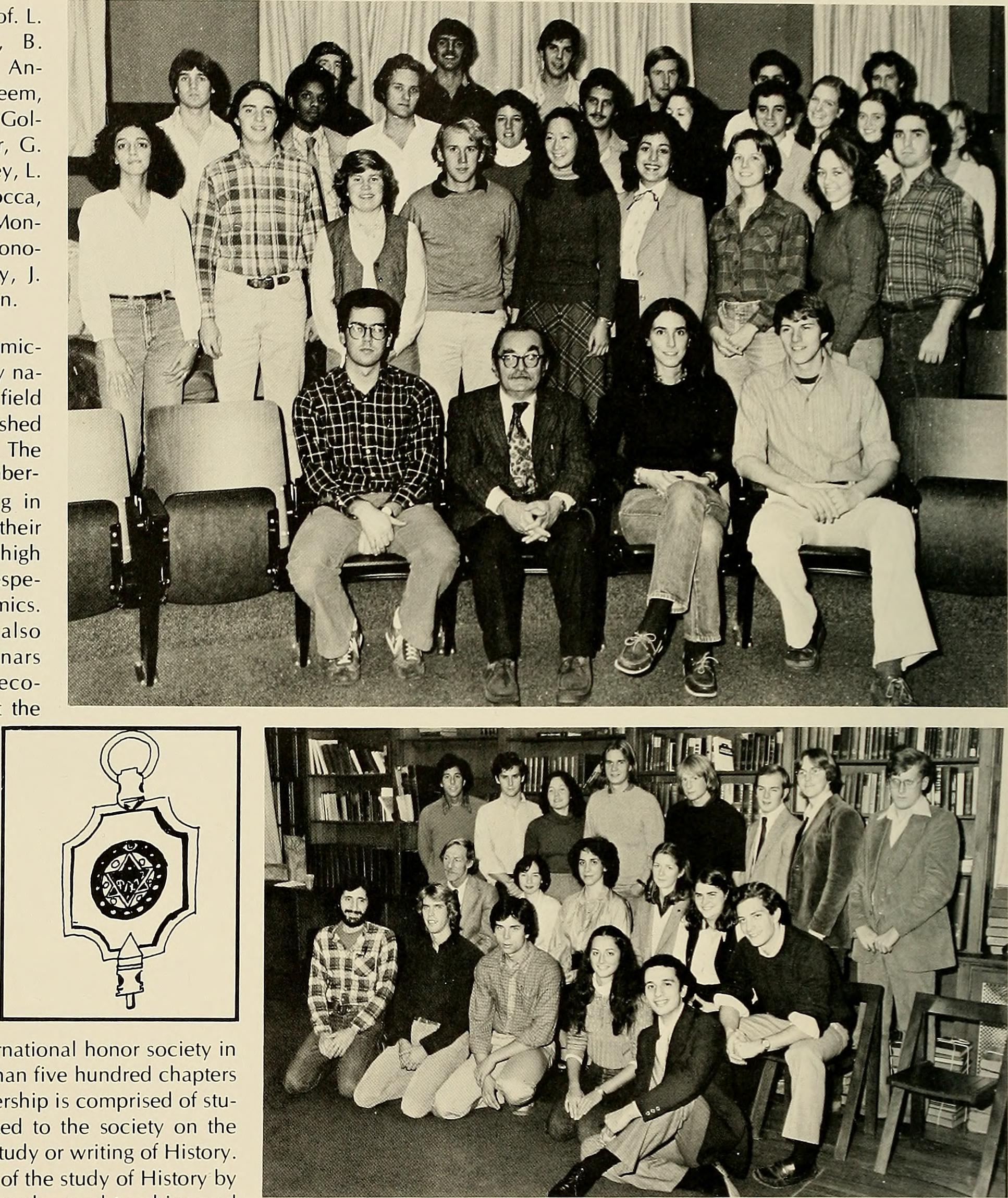
1973 members of Phi Alpha Theta at Boston College (bottom)

Its emblem may be mounted upon a gold key, "which shall be in the form of a rectangle nineteen by twenty-one millimeters, and the corners of which shall be cut along the arcs of circles having a radius of four millimeters, the centers of said circles being at the corners of the key, and the edges of the key shall be [beveled] to a distance not to exceed one millimeter from the edge." A cylindrical stem projects from the top of the emblem finished with a ring. The cylinder projects from the lower edge of the key, similarly.

Phi Alpha Theta's motto is "Seek Truth: The society's colors are "Madonna red" and "Madonna blue". Members may wear a deep red and light blue honor cord at graduation. Its flower is the red rose.

The society's quarterly publication is The Historian, which includes articles and book reviews. Voces Novae: Chapman University Historical Review was founded in the Spring of 2009 by the Alpha Mu Gamma chapter of Phi Alpha Theta at Chapman University.

== Governance ==
The society's national headquarters and the journal's editorial offices are located at the University of South Florida.

Hosok O of Utah Tech University the current president, and Kyriakos Nalmpantis of Baldwin Wallace University is the vice president of Phi Alpha Theta National History Honor Society. Debra A. Mulligan is chair of the Advisory Board. Kees Boterbloem of the University of South Florida is the managing editor of The Historian, and Jonathan Scott Perry also of USF is the journal's book review editor.

== Membership ==
Undergraduate students must have a 3.0 overall grade point average, and at least a 3.1 average in their history courses. Undergraduate candidates must also be in the top 35% of their class. Students need not be majoring in history but must have taken at least four history courses at the university level. Specific universities may develop higher qualifications. For example, the College of Staten Island's PAT chapter requires undergraduate students to have a GPA of or better than 3.25, a History GPA of or better than 3.5, and at least 16 hours completed in History classes. Graduate students must have a GPA of better than 3.5 and have completed approximately 30% of the residence requirements for the master's degree.

== Chapters ==
Phi Alpha Theta has established more than 970 chapters.

== See also ==
- Professional fraternities and sororities
