= Ad apostolicae dignitatis apicem =

Medieval apostolic letter

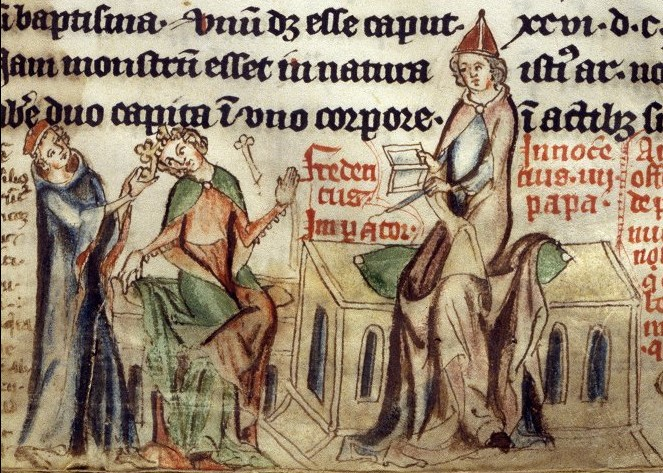
14th century miniature depicting the excommunication of Emperor Frederick II by Pope Innocent IV

Ad apostolicae dignitatis apicem was an apostolic letter issued against Holy Roman Emperor Frederick II by Pope Innocent IV (1243–54), during the Council of Lyon, 17 July 1245, the third year of his pontificate.

The letter sets forth that Innocent, desiring to have peace restored to those parts which were then distracted by dissensions, sent for that purpose three legates to Frederick as the chief author of those evils, pointed out the way to peace, and promised that he would do his own part to restore it. Frederick agreed to terms of peace, which he swore to observe, but which he at once violated. The letter then sets forth the crimes of which Frederick was guilty. It accuses him of perjury; of contempt for the spiritual authority of the Roman Pontiff, by disregarding the excommunication pronounced against him and by compelling others to do so; of invading pontifical territory; of having broken the terms of peace made with Pope Gregory, and which he swore to keep; of oppressing the Church in Sicily; of having taken, persecuted, and done to death bishops and others who were on their way to Rome for a council which he himself had asked to be convoked; of having incurred suspicion of heresy for treating a papal excommunication with contempt; of having conspired with the Saracens and other enemies of Christianity; of being guilty of the death of Louis I, Duke of Bavaria, and of giving his daughter in marriage to a schismatic; of not paying tribute for Sicily, which is the patrimony of St. Peter. For these and for other crimes, Innocent IV, by this apostolic letter, declares Frederick unworthy to rule, and his subjects freed from their duty of obedience to him as sovereign.

== See also ==
- Papal deposing power
- Interregnum (Holy Roman Empire)
