= Scandinavian Journal of History =

Academic journal

- Categories: History journals
- Publisher: Routledge, Taylor & Francis Group
- First issue: 1976; 50 years ago
- Language: English
- Website: http://www.tandfonline.com/loi/shis20
- ISSN: 0346-8755
- OCLC: 49709144

The Scandinavian Journal of History is a peer-reviewed journal in English, published since 1976 under the auspices of the historical associations of Denmark, Finland, Iceland, Norway and Sweden. It aims to survey themes in recent Scandinavian historical research, concentrating on national particularities and developments.

According to the publisher, it strives to give priority to efforts of placing Scandinavian developments into a larger context, that is studies explicitly comparing Scandinavian processes and phenomena to those in other parts of the world. The journal was created because historians in the Nordic states felt that there was a need for a general history journal on the Nordic region in the English language.

The journal appears printed and on the Internet. All peer review is double blind.
