= Sinus Persicus (journal) =

- Discipline: Archaeology, History, Iranian Studies
- Language: English, Persian, Arabic
- Edited by: Shahin Aryamanesh

Publication details
- History: 2024–present
- Publisher: Tissaphernes Archaeological Research Group (Iran)
- Frequency: Semiannual

Standard abbreviations
- ISO 4: Sinus Persicus

Indexing
- ISSN: 3041-993X (print); 3041-9948 (web)

Links
- Journal homepage

Sinus Persicus is a scholarly journal publishing papers on Persian Gulf and Gulf of Oman. The journal was established by Shahin Aryamanesh, faculty member of Institute for Humanities and Cultural Studies.

The journal covers studies on the culture and civilization of the Persian Gulf and Gulf of Oman in its broadest sense. Sinus Persicus publishes on Persian studies, including archaeology, ancient history, linguistics, religion, epigraphy, numismatics, and the history of art of the Persian Gulf, Gulf of Oman, Strait of Hormuz, and Persian Gulf islands, as well as on cultural exchanges and relations between Iran and its neighbours.

This journal is published in English, Persian, and Arabic by Tissaphernes Archaeological Research Group.

Sinus Persicus is an open access journal and was indexed in Scopus. This journal ranked first among Iranian journals in the SCImago ranking.
