= Erik Arup =

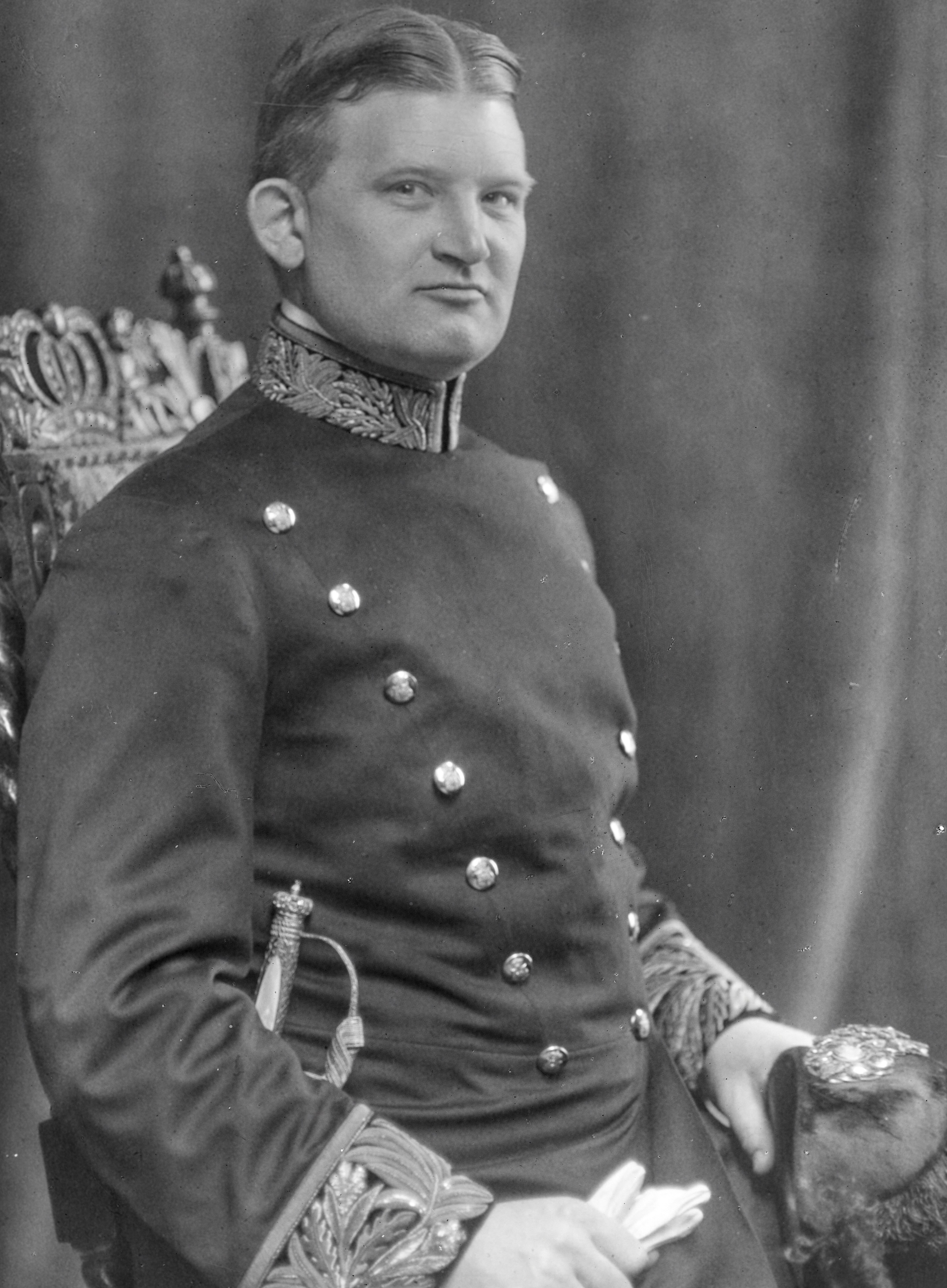
Image of Erik Arup

Erik Ipsen Arup (November 22, 1876 – September 23, 1951) was a Danish historian and educator. He was most known as the pioneer of radical-liberal history writing in Denmark.

== Biography ==
Arup was born at Slangerup in Frederikssund Municipality, Denmark. He was the son of the physician Peter Michael Christian Arup (1845–1915) and Malvina Cathrine Ipsen (1852–1934). He was raised in a cultured home and was the cousin of Danish-English structural engineer Ove Arup (1895–1988). He was educated as both a theologian and a historian. Arup attended the University of Copenhagen and was awarded his dr.phil. in 1907.

As a young man he was deeply impressed by Viggo Hørup and his political anti-militarist line. During World War I, Arup was connected to the cabinet of social-liberal Carl Theodor Zahle as a permanent under-secretary. From 1908 to 1914 he was archivist in the Ministry of Foreign Affairs. From 1914 to 1916, he was the first Permanent Secretary at the Prime Minister's Office. In 1916, Arup replaced Kristian Erslev as professor of history at the University of Copenhagen, a position he held until 31 January 1947.

Arup was also the editor of Historisk Tidsskrift from 1917 to 1924, involved in editing Danish medieval sources from 1931 to 1937, and for some years collaborator to the pioneering Danish-Swedish periodical Scandia. He took a particular interest in Iceland and, as member of several organisations dealing with Danish-Icelandic relations, he generally showed himself compliant with Icelandic views.

== Works ==
His breakthrough came with his dissertation Studier i engelsk og tysk Handels Historie (1907), a pioneering work stressing the geographic and economic, instead of the national or ethnic, background behind the development of trade. In addition to this work, he notably wrote on economic history in Schleswig-Holstein, on medieval economy, and on 18th Century foreign policy - besides producing a quick and popular biography of his inspirational figure Hørup (1941).

Arup's main work was his unfinished Danmarks Historie (published 1925–32) covering Danish history until 1624 (a posthumous volume, published in 1955, deals with the period until 1665). It was conceived as a textbook for the university but was, because of the considerable debate attending the publication of its first parts, never completed. What is innovative in this work is Arup's coverage of his country's evolution mainly from the angle of material development, of agriculture, of trade, and to some extent of public health. Political or international relations are not ignored, but are somewhat relegated to the background. The work is strongly influenced by the author's political views: his favourite aversions are war policy and militarism, arbitrary royal power, a number of national-patriotic myths, and in general everything he interprets as nationalist views. Among the author's ”victims” are thus Saxo Grammaticus, Absalon, King Christian IV, while men such as Christian II or some medieval opposition figures are given more approval. Arup concentrated on period documents rather than chronicles or other secondary narratives, and more generally introduces strict demands regarding source criticism. He did not mention any sources in his work.

The book provoked embittered attacks from many Danish historians. Arup was accused of non-patriotic views and of superficiality. Much of this may have been a more or less predictable conservative reaction against social-liberal views that were far from broadly accepted or understood at the time. More relevant today perhaps, is the critique of Arup as lacking historical feel and holding anachronistic views (such as his attempt to find “parliamentarian” traces in medieval government). Also, it has been argued that his work is more a reevaluation of existing values than a set of new discoveries. Nonetheless, Danmarks Historie is in its own country still regarded as the most consistent break with traditional historical writing, and has offered much inspiration to later social-liberal and Marxist historians. Thus if Arup was on collision course with many colleagues of his age, he did acquire many faithful followers among younger historians.

== Influences ==
In many ways Arup considered himself a modern heir to 16th century Danish historian Arild Huitfeldt (1546–1609).

Among congenial contemporaries historians, Curt Weibull (1886–1991), founder of Scandia, should be highlighted. Arup's methodological views also appear inspired by French historians such as Charles Seignobos (1854-1942) and Charles-Victor Langlois (1863–1929).

== Other sources ==
- Dansk Biografisk Leksikon, vol. 1. Copenhagen: Gyldendal, 1979–84.
- Christensen, Aksel E. "Erik Ipsen Arup. 22. november 1876 - 23. september 1951", in Festskrift, udgivet af Københavns Universitet i anledning af universitetets årsfest november 1952, pp. 115–33. Copenhagen: University of Copenhagen, 1952. (Detailed obituary.)
- Svenstrup, Thyge. Arup. Copenhagen: Museum Tusculanum, 2006. (Recent, full-length biography, with 13 pp. English Summary.)
