= Grandi non immerito =

1245 papal bull by Pope Innocent IV

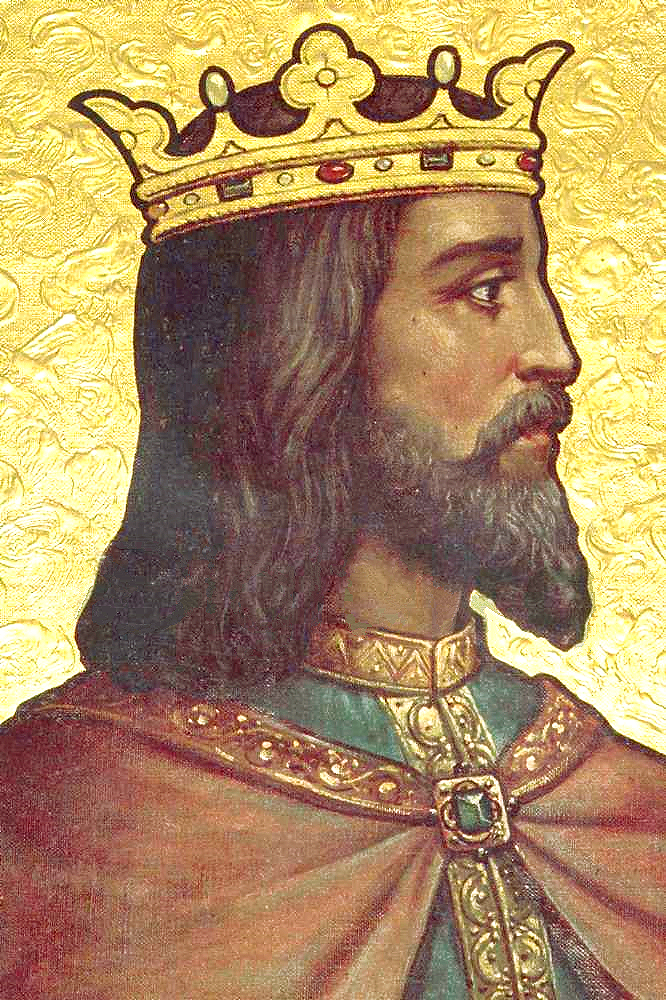
Sancho II of Portugal

Grandi non immerito was a papal bull issued by Pope Innocent IV on 24 July 1245, that effectively removed Sancho II of Portugal from the throne, replacing him with his brother and heir Afonso, Count of Boulogne, in the capacity of regent.

The King's administrative negligence and frequent conflicts with the clergy (which had gotten him excommunicated already by that point), along with his unwillingness to listen to the Roman Curia, led to Pope Innocent IV issuing the bull Inter alia desiderabilia in March 1245, which severely crippled Sancho's authority by charging him with the responsibility for the kingdom's near-anarchical state. Following the First Council of Lyon, that same year, Innocent IV issued Grandi non immerito urging the people and nobility of Portugal to receive the Count of Boulogne and to pay him "fidelity, homage, allegiance, and accordance", under threat of ecclesiastical censure. The bull did not, however, nominally depose King Sancho or remove any descendants he would beget from the succession (though he would go on to die with no legitimate children).

The Count of Boulogne ruled the kingdom using the styles of Visitador, Curador e Defensor do Reino ("Visitor, Caretaker and Defender of the Realm") until his brother's death and his own eventual acclamation as Afonso III of Portugal.

== See also ==
- Papal deposing power
