= Internationales Archiv für Sozialgeschichte der deutschen Literatur =

German literary academic journal

The Internationales Archiv für Sozialgeschichte der deutschen Literatur (IASL) (ISSN 1865-9128) is an academic journal devoted to German studies, medieval through contemporary. Founded in 1976, it focuses on the relationship between literature and social history and on intersections of literary theory, history and the social sciences. Articles are published in German and English.
