= War & Society =

Scholarly journal

- Discipline: Military History
- Language: English
- Edited by: Eleanor Hancock

Publication details
- History: 1983–present
- Publisher: Taylor & Francis on behalf of the School of Humanities and Social Sciences, University of New South Wales, Canberra (Australia)
- Frequency: Quarterly
- Impact factor: 0.5 (2025)

Standard abbreviations
- ISO 4: War Soc.

Indexing
- ISSN: 0729-2473 (print); 2042-4345 (web)
- OCLC no.: 86222250

Links
- Journal homepage; Online access

War & Society is an international scholarly journal focused on warfare and society. It is published quarterly in England by Taylor & Francis since 1984. It is edited by the School of Humanities and Social Sciences at the University of New South Wales, Canberra by Associate Professor Eleanor Hancock. Seven historians from the United States and the United Kingdom make up the editorial board. It is indexed by major services. Its "impact factor" in 2025 was 0.5.

== See also ==
- Armed Forces & Society
- International Security
- Journal of Peace Research
- Journal of Conflict Resolution
- Military Review
- Naval War College Review
- Parameters
- Security Studies
- The Journal of Military History
