= Boletín americanista =

- Discipline: History
- Language: Spanish
- Edited by: Pilar García Jordán

Publication details
- History: 1959-present
- Publisher: Sección de Historia de América, Facultad de Geografía e Historia, University of Barcelona (Spain)
- Frequency: Biannual

Standard abbreviations
- ISO 4: Bol. Am.

Indexing
- ISSN: 0520-4100

Links
- Site at Dialnet of University of La Rioja

Boletín americanista is a peer-reviewed academic journal specialising in the history of the Americas. It was established in 1959 and is published since 2010 on a biannual (semestral) basis. The journal is published by Sección de Historia de América, Facultad de Geografía e Historia of the University of Barcelona. Its current editor is Pilar García Jordán.

Boletín americanista is indexed in the University of La Rioja's bibliographic database Dialnet.
