= Revista de Historia Americana y Argentina =

- Discipline: History
- Language: Spanish
- Edited by: Patricia Barrio

Publication details
- History: 1956–present
- Publisher: Instituto de Historia Americana y Argentina /Editorial de la Facultad de Filosofía y Letras, Universidad Nacional de Cuyo (Argentina)
- Frequency: Biannually (until 1998), Annually (2002-2010), Semestrally (since 2011)

Standard abbreviations
- ISO 4: Rev. Hist. Am. Argent.

Indexing
- ISSN: 0556-5960 (print); 2314-1549 (web)
- LCCN: 62033624
- OCLC no.: 225763439

Links
- Journal homepage; Journal page at SciELO

Revista de Historia Americana y Argentina is a semestral peer-reviewed academic journal specialising in the history of the Americas and Argentina in particular. The journal is indexed in Latindex, Núcleo Básico de Revistas Científicas Argentinas (CAICYT/CONICET), SciELO and others (Europub, Malena, Miar). The journal is also part of LatinRev.
