= The Journal of Legislative Studies =

- Discipline: Legislatures
- Language: English
- Edited by: Philip Norton

Publication details
- History: 1995–present
- Publisher: Routledge
- Frequency: Quarterly

Standard abbreviations
- ISO 4: J. Legis. Stud.

Indexing
- ISSN: 1357-2334 (print); 1743-9337 (web)
- LCCN: 97661050
- OCLC no.: 52079186

Links
- Journal homepage; Online access; Online archive

The Journal of Legislative Studies is a quarterly peer-reviewed academic journal covering research on legislatures. It was established in 1995 and is published by Routledge. The editor-in-chief is Philip Norton (University of Hull).
