= History journal =

Academic serial publication

A history journal is an academic serial publication designed to present new scholarship on a historical subject, usually a subfield of history, with articles generally being subjected to peer review.

== History and development ==
The historical journal, a forum where academic historians could exchange ideas and publish newly discovered information, came into being in the 19th century. The early journals were similar to those for the physical sciences, and were seen as a means for history to become more professional. Journals also helped historians to establish various historiographical approaches, the most notable example of which was Annales. Économies. Sociétés. Civilisations., a publication instrumental in establishing the Annales School.

Some historical journals are as follows:

- 1839 Messager des sciences historiques (Belgium)
- 1840 Historisk Tidsskrift (Denmark)
- 1859 Historische Zeitschrift (Germany)
- 1866 Archivum historicum, later Historiallinen arkisto (Finland, published in Finnish)
- 1866 Revue des questions historiques (France)
- 1867 Századok (Hungary)
- 1871 Historisk Tidsskrift (Norway)
- 1876 Revue Historique (France)
- 1881 Historisk tidskrift (Sweden)
- 1886 English Historical Review (UK)
- 1895 American Historical Review (USA)
- 1912 History
- 1914 Mississippi Valley Historical Review (renamed in 1964 the Journal of American History) (USA)
- 1916 The Journal of Negro History
- 1916 Historisk Tidskrift för Finland (Finland, published in Swedish)
- 1918 Hispanic American historical review
- 1928 Scandia (Sweden)
- 1929 Annales. Économies. Sociétés. Civilisations
- 1952 Past & present: a journal of historical studies (Great Britain)
- 1953 Vierteljahrshefte für Zeitgeschichte (Germany)
- 1956 Journal of the Historical Society of Nigeria (Nigeria)
- 1960 Journal of African History (Cambridge)
- 1960 Technology and culture: the international quarterly of the Society for the History of Technology (USA)
- 1975 Geschichte und Gesellschaft. Zeitschrift für historische Sozialwissenschaft (Germany)
- 1976 Internationales Archiv für Sozialgeschichte der deutschen Literatur (Germany)
- 1976 Journal of Family History
- 1982 Storia della Storiografia — History of Historiography — Histoire de l'Historiographie — Geschichte der Geschichtsschreibung
- 1982 Subaltern Studies (Oxford University Press)
- 1986 Zeitschrift für Sozialgeschichte des 20. und 21. Jahrhunderts, new title since 2003: Sozial.Geschichte. Zeitschrift für historische Analyse des 20. und 21. Jahrhunderts (Germany)
- 1990 Gender and history
- 1990 L'Homme. Zeitschrift für feministische Geschichtswissenschaft (Austria)
- 1990 Österreichische Zeitschrift für Geschichtswissenschaften (ÖZG)
- 1992 Women's History Review
- 1993 Historische Anthropologie

== See also ==
- List of history journals
- List of historical societies, most of which publish journals or magazines
- Historiography
- History
