= Journal of the History of Childhood and Youth =

- Discipline: Youth studies
- Language: English
- Edited by: Julia M. Gossard and Holly N.S. White

Publication details
- History: 2008-present
- Publisher: Johns Hopkins University Press (United States)
- Frequency: Triannually

Standard abbreviations
- ISO 4: J. Hist. Child. Youth

Indexing
- ISSN: 1939-6724 (print); 1941-3599 (web)
- OCLC no.: 191902303

Links
- Journal homepage; Online access

The Journal of the History of Childhood and Youth is an international peer-reviewed academic journal that publishes original academic articles that engage with, and contribute to, the history of childhood and youth.

Articles foreground the experiences of children and youth in the past and employ age, childhood, and youth as essential analytical categories in studying the past. JHCY is the official journal of the Society for the History of Children and Youth. It is indexed in Historical Abstracts and America: History and Life, the two principal historical indexing services.

The journal was founded in 2008 by Martha Saxton and Laura L. Lovett. The journal is published three times per year by the Johns Hopkins University Press.

== See also ==
- Childhood studies
- Youth
