= Revista Complutense de Historia de América =

- Discipline: History
- Language: Spanish
- Edited by: Pilar Ponce Leiva

Publication details
- History: 1975-present
- Publisher: Complutense University of Madrid (Spain)
- Frequency: Annually
- Open access: Yes

Standard abbreviations
- ISO 4: Rev. Complut. Hist. Am.

Indexing
- ISSN: 1132-8312 (print); 1988-270X (web)
- LCCN: 93656243
- OCLC no.: 769231972

Links
- Journal homepage; Online access; Online archive

The Revista Complutense de Historia de América is a peer-reviewed academic journal covering the history of the Americas. It is published annually by the Complutense University of Madrid and is abstracted and indexed in Scopus. The editor-in-chief is Pilar Ponce Leiva (Universidad Complutense de Madrid).
