= Revista Chilena de Historia del Derecho =

- Discipline: Legal history
- Language: Spanish
- Edited by: Felipe Vicencio Eyzaguirre

Publication details
- History: 1959–present
- Publisher: University of Chile (Chile)
- Frequency: Annual
- Open access: Yes

Standard abbreviations
- ISO 4: Rev. Chil. Hist. Derecho

Indexing
- ISSN: 0716-5447
- LCCN: 60040162
- OCLC no.: 1587179

Links
- Journal homepage; Online access; Online archive

The Revista Chilena de Historia del Derecho is a peer-reviewed academic journal covering legal history that is published by the University of Chile. It was established in 1959 and its subject matter are legal affairs which have become history; the editor-in-chief is Felipe Vicencio Eyzaguirre (University of Chile).

The Revista's first editor was Alamiro de Ávila. The predecessor to the Revista is the Boletín de Derecho Público, a specialist legal journal created by Aníbal Bascuñán Valdés, who taught history of law at the university from 1931. As of 2012, the Revista was the second oldest then-currently published Chilean law journal. In 2014, Claudio Barahona Gallardo wrote that the Revista was now "the oldest journal of its type in Hispanic America."

In May 1960, Lewis Hanke reviewed on The Hispanic American Historical Review the very first issue of the Revista Chilena de Historia del Derecho, and pronounced it "A valuable new review in a relatively undeveloped field." Prestige-wise, Antonio Dougnac Rodríguez in 2021 qualified it as the predecessor of Revista de Estudios Histórico-Jurídicos, founded in 1976.
