= Reti Medievali Rivista =

- Language: English

Standard abbreviations
- ISO 4: Reti Mediev. Riv.

Indexing
- ISSN: 1593-2214

Reti Medievali Rivista is an online-only open-access double-blind peer-reviewed academic journal, published twice a year, devoted to the study of the European Middle Ages. The journal was founded in 2000. It is listed in the Directory of Open Access Journals, and has an H Index of 5. It has been classed as an A-class journal by the Italian National Agency for the Evaluation of Universities and Research Institutes.
