= Collectanea Hibernica =

- Discipline: History
- Language: English

Publication details
- History: 1958–2006
- Publisher: Franciscan Province of Ireland (Republic of Ireland)
- Frequency: Annually

Standard abbreviations
- ISO 4: Collect. Hibernica

Indexing
- ISSN: 0530-7058
- LCCN: 2008-235308
- JSTOR: 05307058
- OCLC no.: 248557020

Collectanea Hibernica was a history journal published annually by the Franciscan Province of Ireland between 1958 and 2006. It published sources on Irish history and guides to manuscript materials.
