= Ancient Iranian Studies =

- Discipline: Archaeology, history, Iranian studies
- Language: English, Persian
- Edited by: Shahin Aryamanesh

Publication details
- History: 2022–present
- Publisher: Tissaphernes Archaeological Research Group (Iran)
- Frequency: Quarterly

Standard abbreviations
- ISO 4: Anc. Iran. Stud.

Indexing
- ISSN: 2821-2215 (print); 2821-2223 (web)

Links
- Journal homepage

Ancient Iranian Studies is a peer-reviewed open access academic journal covering research on ancient Iran.

== Background ==
The journal was established in 2022 by Shahin Aryamanesh (Institute for Humanities and Cultural Studies. Articles are in English and Persian and cover studies on the culture and civilization of pre-Islamic Persia in its broadest sense, including archaeology, ancient history, linguistics, religion, epigraphy, numismatics, and the history of art of ancient Iran, as well as on cultural exchanges and relations between Persia and its neighbours. The journal is published by the Tissaphernes Archaeological Research Group.

The journal is abstracted and indexed in Scopus.
