= Anuario de Historia de la Iglesia =

The Anuario de Historia de la Iglesia (Yearbook of the History of the Church) is an annual open access academic journal published by the Institute of the History of the Church (Faculty of Theology, University of Navarra). It was established in 1992 and covers ecclesiastical history, religious history, theological history, and the history of art. Its founding editor-in-chief was Josep-Ignasi Saranyana, the current editor is Álvaro Fernández de Córdova. Publishing formats are Studies, Historiography and bibliography, Conversations, Chronicles, and Reviews.

== Abstracting and indexing ==
The journal is abstracted and indexed in:

- Latindex
- Arts & Humanities Citation Index
- Catholic Periodical and Literature Index
- Academic Search Complete
- L'Année Philologique
- Redalyc
- Scopus
