= Studies in People's History =

- Discipline: History
- Language: English
- Edited by: Irfan Habib and Shireen Moosvi

Publication details
- History: 2014
- Publisher: SAGE Publications (India)
- Frequency: Biannual

Standard abbreviations
- ISO 4: Stud. People's Hist.

Indexing
- ISSN: 2348-4489 (print); 2349-7718 (web)

Links
- Journal homepage; Online access; Online archive

Studies in People's History is a peer reviewed journal. It is a forum that embraces all aspects of History under the broadest of definitions, but always bearing in mind their relationship with society at large.

It is published twice a year by SAGE Publications in association with Aligarh Historians Society.

This journal is a member of the Committee on Publication Ethics (COPE).

== Abstracting and indexing ==
Studies in People’s History is abstracted and indexed in:

- J-Gate
- SCOPUS
- UGC-CARE
