= Change Over Time =

- Discipline: History of architecture
- Language: English
- Edited by: Frank Matero

Publication details
- History: 2011–present
- Publisher: University of Pennsylvania Press (United States)
- Frequency: Semiannual

Standard abbreviations
- ISO 4: Change Time

Indexing
- ISSN: 2153-053X (print); 2153-0548 (web)
- LCCN: 2010202756
- OCLC no.: 501020174

Links
- Journal homepage; Journal page at publisher's website; Online access at Project MUSE

Change Over Time is a semiannual peer-reviewed academic journal covering the history, theory, and practice of conservation and the built environment. Each issue is devoted to a particular theme. The journal was established in 2011 and is published by the University of Pennsylvania Press and available online through Project MUSE. The editor-in-chief is Frank Matero (University of Pennsylvania). The journal received the 2012 Association of American University Presses' Design Award for Best Journal Design.

== Abstracting and indexing ==
The journal is abstracted and indexed in the Arts & Humanities Citation Index and Current Contents/Arts & Humanities.
