= Programming Historian =

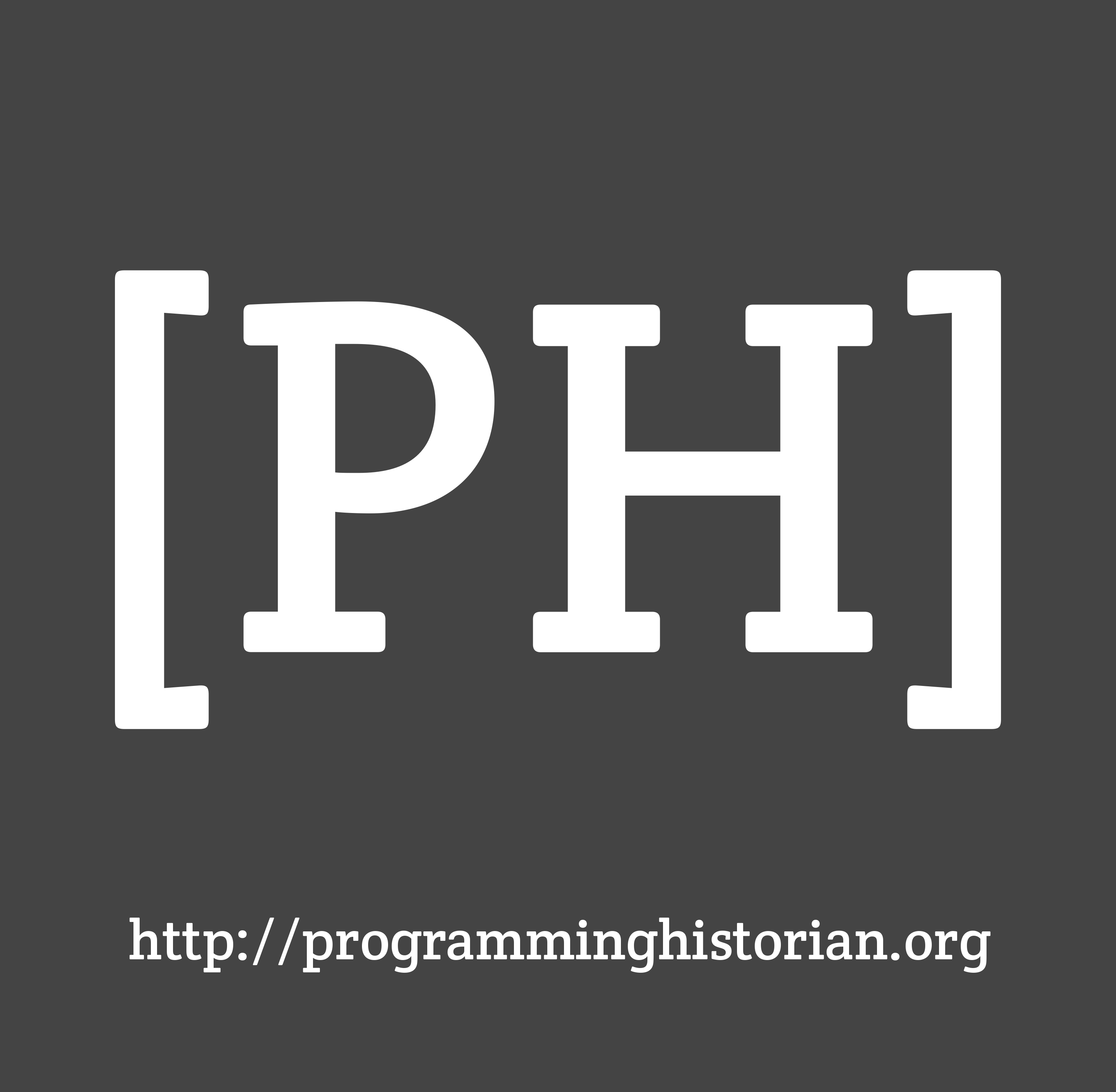
- Discipline: Digital Humanities
- Language: English, Spanish, French, Portuguese
- Edited by: Laura Alice Chapot (English), Jennifer Isasi (Spanish), Daphné Mathelier (French), Eric Brasil (Portuguese)

Publication details
- History: 2012–present
- Publisher: ProgHist Ltd (United Kingdom)
- Open access: Yes
- License: CC BY

Standard abbreviations
- ISO 4: Program. Hist.

Indexing
- English
- ISSN: 2397-2068
- Spanish
- ISSN: 2517-5769
- French
- ISSN: 2631-9462
- Portuguese
- ISSN: 2753-9296

Links
- Journal homepage

The Programming Historian is a peer-reviewed open-access academic journal of digital humanities and digital history methodology. It covers digital humanities research methods and also publishes tutorials that help humanities scholars learn a wide range of digital tools, techniques, and workflows to facilitate research and teaching. The original project was based upon a series of lessons written by William J. Turkel and Alan MacEachern of the University of Western Ontario in 2008. The project launched as an academic journal during the Digital Humanities 2012 conference in Hamburg. The journal publishes in English, Spanish, French, and Portuguese.

The project has twice won a "Digital Humanities Award". In 2016 it won "Best Series of Posts" for its English-language content. In 2017 it won "Best Series of Posts" for its Spanish-language content. In 2018, The Spanish version, was the winner of the "Mejor iniciativa formativa desarrollada durante el año 2018" of the Humanidades Digitales Hispánicas Association. It also won the Canadian Social Knowledge Institute's Open Scholarship Award 2020 and in 2021 it was awarded the Coko Foundation's Open Publishing Award in the Open Content category. Programming Historian has also been involved in social issues in digital humanities, conducting a self-reflection and survey into gender biases in the project in 2015 in an attempt to encourage more participation from female authors and reviewers.

The journal is indexed by the Directory of Open Access Journals.
