= History of Intellectual Culture =

- Discipline: History of knowledge
- Language: English
- Edited by: Charlotte A. Lerg, Johan Östling & Jana Weiß

Publication details
- History: 1999–2021 as a journal; since 2021 as a yearbook
- Publisher: De Gruyter (Germany)
- Frequency: Annual
- Open access: yes

Standard abbreviations
- ISO 4: Hist. Intellect. Cult.

Indexing
- ISSN: 2747-6766 (print); 2747-6774 (web)

Links
- Journal homepage; Issues

History of Intellectual Culture (HIC) is an international yearbook devoted to the history of knowledge. It was founded in 2021 and is published by De Gruyter. Its editors-in-chief are Charlotte A. Lerg (Munich), Johan Östling (Lund), and Jana Weiß (Münster). The yearbook is the successor of the journal of the same name, founded in 1999.

== History ==
The journal History of Intellectual Culture was conceived in 1999 by University of Calgary professors Dr. Paul Stortz and Dr. E. Lisa Panayotidis. Its first issue was in 2001 and it published original research on intellectual history, cultural history, history of education, etc.

The first issue of the yearbook will be published in 2022 and comprises three sections: articles (an open section); the theme "Participatory Knowledge"; and engaging the field.

== Advisory board ==
- Peter Burke, University of Cambridge
- Heather Ellis, University of Sheffield
- Tiffany N. Florvil, University of New Mexico
- Adam Kola, Nicolaus Copernicus University
- Suzanne L. Marchand, Louisiana State University
- Pierre-Héli Monot, LMU Munich
- João Ohara, Federal University of Rio de Janeiro
- Eugenia Roldán Vera, Center for Research and Advanced Studies (CINVESTAV), Mexico
- Christa Wirth, University of Agder
