= Anuario Colombiano de Historia Social y de la Cultura =

Annual Colombian history academic journal

- Discipline: Latin American studies, History, Technology
- Language: Spanish
- Edited by: Max S. Hering Torres

Publication details
- History: 1963–present
- Publisher: Department of History, National University of Colombia (Colombia)
- Frequency: biannual

Standard abbreviations
- ISO 4: Anu. Colomb. Hist. Soc. Cult.

Indexing
- ISSN: 0120-2456 (print); 2256-5647 (web)

Links
- Journal homepage

The Anuario Colombiano de Historia Social y de la Cultura (transl. Colombian Yearbook of Social History and Culture), founded in 1963 by Jaime Jaramillo Uribe, is the academic journal of the Department of History of the National University of Colombia. (Note: "El Anuario Colombiano de Historia Social y de la Cultura es la publicación del Departamento de Historia de la Universidad Nacional de Colombia, sede Bogotá. Fue fundada en 1963 por Jaime Jaramillo Uribe" ["The Colombian Yearbook of Social History and Culture is the publication of the Department of History of the National University of Colombia, Bogotá headquarters. It was founded in 1963 by Jaime Jaramillo Uribe"]) It is funded by the Faculty of Human Sciences at the university's headquarters in Bogotá. (Note: "La revista está adscrita al Departamento de Historia y es financiada por la Facultad de Ciencias Humanas de la Universidad Nacional de Colombia, sede Bogotá." ["The magazine is attached to the Department of History and is funded by the Faculty of Human Sciences of the National University of Colombia, Bogotá headquarters."]) Although it mainly publishes research on Colombian history, it also accepts research on Latin American and world history, as well as historiography. (Note: "Su objetivo principal es divulgar investigaciones sobre la historia de Colombia, sin embargo, acepta también trabajos sobre América Latina y el mundo, así como análisis de carácter historiográfico o teórico." ["Its main objective is to disseminate research on the history of Colombia, however, it also accepts works on Latin America and the world, as well as historiographic or theoretical analysis."]) It has been recognised as the main publication of Colombian historical studies. Authors are national and international scholars. (Note: "Después de más de cincuenta años de existencia, el Anuario Colombiano de Historia Social y de la Cultura se ha constituido en un espacio fundamental para historiadores, científicos sociales, docentes, estudiantes de posgrado y especialistas, tanto nacionales como extranjeros, interesados en la producción y difusión de conocimiento histórico." ["After more than fifty years of existence, the Colombian Yearbook of Social History and Culture has become a fundamental space for historians, social scientists, teachers, graduate students and specialists, both national and foreign, interested in the production and dissemination of historical knowledge."])

The journal currently publishes two issues annually. (Note: "El Anuario publica dos (2) números por año." ["The Yearbook publishes two (2) numbers per year."]) Its editor is Max S. Hering Torres. (Note: "Max S. Hering Torres (actual director)" ["Max S. Hering Torres (current director)"])
