= Information Age Publishing =

American book publisher

- Founded: 1999
- Founder: George Johnson
- Country of origin: United States
- Headquarters location: Charlotte, North Carolina
- Distribution: Multiple companies (US); Login Brothers Canada (Canada); Co Info (Australia); Taylor & Francis (Asia); The Eurospan Group (Europe); Maruzen (Japan); Sara Books (India)
- Publication types: Books, academic journals
- Official website: www.infoagepub.com

Information Age Publishing Inc. (IAP) is a publisher of academic books, primarily in the fields of education and management. Founded in 1999 by George F. Johnson, it is located in Charlotte, North Carolina.

IAP was purchased by an academic publisher, Emerald Publishing of the UK (Leeds), in November 2024.
