= Analecta Hibernica =

- Discipline: History
- Language: English
- Edited by: James Kelly

Publication details
- History: 1930–present
- Publisher: Irish Manuscripts Commission (Republic of Ireland)
- Frequency: Annually

Standard abbreviations
- ISO 4: Analecta Hibernica

Indexing
- ISSN: 0791-6167
- LCCN: 2009-235704
- JSTOR: 07916167
- OCLC no.: 448038414

Links
- Journal homepage

Analecta Hibernica is the official academic journal of the Irish Manuscripts Commission, carrying reports on the commission's work and publishing shorter manuscripts. It was established in 1930 and is edited by James Kelly.
