= Kristian Erslev =

Danish historian (1852–1930)

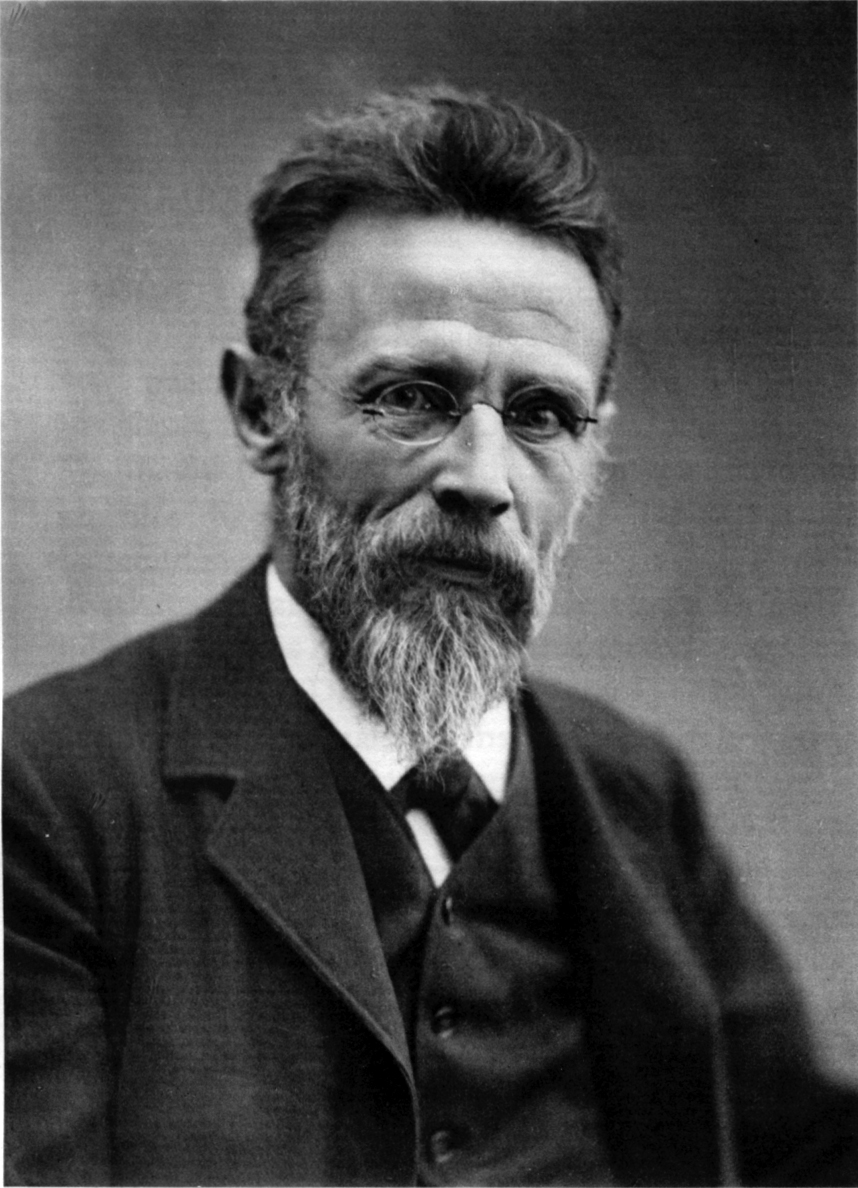
- Kristian Erslev c1922

Kristian Sophus August Erslev (December 28, 1852 – June 20, 1930) was a Danish historian and professor.

== Biography ==
Kristian Erslev was born in Copenhagen, Denmark. In 1870, Erslev graduated from Mariboes School in Copenhagen, and began studying at the University of Copenhagen, graduating with a magister degree in 1876. After a study trip to Germany, Italy, Greece and France, he return in 1879 to graduate as Dr.Phil. From 1881, Erslev became a research fellow at the Gehejme Archives and in 1883 he became professor of history at the University of Copenhagen.

His work involved a variety of subjects, including historiography. Erslev's influence on the Danish academic community was great and he was considered "the master" Danish historian. As editor of the Danish Historisk Tidsskrift he also set the standards for solid, factual historical writing. He looked to other European scientists for inspiration, but never fully solved the problems of objectivity and the influence of "the person behind the pen". He was openly attacked by later generations of Danish historians for his strong belief in "the truth".

Erslev was inspired in his early days by the idea that historians should strive to create "true science". However, in his older days he became disillusioned by his previous ideas. He died at Frederiksberg during 1930 was buried at Frederiksberg Ældre Cemetery.
