= Weibull =

Weibull is a Swedish locational surname. The Weibull family share the same roots as the Danish / Norwegian noble family of Falsen. They originated from and were named after the village of Weiböl in Widstedts parish, Jutland, but settled in Skåne, Sweden in the 17th century. The surname Weibull may refer to:

- Curt Weibull (1886–1991), Swedish historian
- Lauritz Weibull (1873–1960), Swedish historian
- Marie Weibull Kornias (born 1954), Swedish politician
- Waloddi Weibull (1887–1979), Swedish scientist and mathematician

== Other uses ==
A number of statistical concepts are named after Waloddi Weibull:

- Exponentiated Weibull distribution
- Poly-Weibull distribution
- Q-Weibull distribution
- Weibull distribution
- Weibull fading
- Weibull modulus
