= Scandia (journal) =

- Discipline: History
- Language: Swedish
- Edited by: Wiebke Kolbe

Publication details
- History: 1928–present
- Publisher: Stiftelsen Scandia (Sweden)
- Frequency: Biannual
- Impact factor: 0.083 (2011)

Standard abbreviations
- ISO 4: Scandia

Indexing
- ISSN: 0036-5483
- LCCN: 49055440
- OCLC no.: 263596110

Links
- Journal homepage; Online archive

Scandia: Tidskrift för historisk forskning is an academic journal for history which has been published since 1928, when it was established by the Swedish historians Lauritz Weibull (1873-1960) and Curt Weibull (1886-1991) in Lund, together with the Danish historian Erik Arup (1876-1951) in Copenhagen. The journal, which has a Scandinavian scope, is, and has always been, affiliated with the Department of History at Lund University.

The first volumes of the journal, which have come into the public domain, are available online as scans and OCR text at Projekt Runeberg. All current and back-issues of the journal are also available via OJS at Lund University Library.
