= Benktander type II distribution =

Distribution introduced by Gunnar Benktander

- Probability density function

- Cumulative distribution function
- Parameters: $a>0$ (real) $0<b\leq1$ (real)
- Support: $x \geq 1$
- PDF: $e^{\frac{a}{b}(1 - x^b)}x^{b-2}\left(ax^b - b + 1\right)$
- CDF: $1 - x^{b-1}e^{\frac{a}{b}(1 - x^b)}$
- Mean: $1+\frac{1}{a}$
- Median: $$\begin{cases} \frac{\log(2)}{a}+1 & \text{if}\ b=1    \\ \left( \left(\frac{1-b}{a}\right)\mathbf{W}\left(\frac{ 2^{\frac{b}{1-b}} a e^{\frac{a}{1-b}} }{1-b} \right) \right)^{\tfrac{1}{b}} & \text{otherwise}\ \end{cases}$$ Where $\mathbf{W}(x)$ is the Lambert W function (Note: From Wolfram Alpha)
- Mode: $1$
- Variance: $\frac{-b + 2ae^{\frac{a}{b}}\mathbf{E}_{1-\frac{1}{b}}\left(\frac{a}{b}\right)}{a^2 b}$ Where $\mathbf{E}_n(x)$ is the generalized Exponential integral

The Benktander type II distribution, also called the Benktander distribution of the second kind, is one of two distributions introduced by Gunnar Benktander (1970) to model heavy-tailed losses commonly found in non-life/casualty actuarial science, using various forms of mean excess functions (Benktander & Segerdahl 1960). This distribution is "close" to the Weibull distribution (Kleiber & Kotz 2003).

== See also ==
- Weibull distribution
- Benktander type I distribution
