= Weibull fading =

Weibull fading, named after Waloddi Weibull, is a simple statistical model of fading used in Wireless communications and based on the Weibull distribution. Empirical studies have shown it to be an effective model in both indoor and outdoor environments.

In 2005, a theoretical model for a particular class of Weibull distributions was described by Sagias and Karagiannidis, who also analyzed channel capacity of a wireless channel in the presence of Weibull fading.
