= Discrete Weibull distribution =

Probability distribution

Discrete Weibull
- Parameters: $\alpha> 0$ scale $\beta >0$ shape
- Support: $x \in \{0, 1,2,\ldots\}$
- PMF: $\exp\left[-\left(\frac{x }{\alpha}\right)^\beta \right]- \exp\left[-\left(\frac{x+1}{\alpha}\right)^\beta \right]$
- CDF: $1-\exp\left[-\left(\frac{x+1}{\alpha}\right)^\beta \right]$

In probability theory and statistics, the discrete Weibull distribution is the discrete variant of the Weibull distribution. Introduced by Toshio Nakagawa and Shunji Osaki in 1975, it is a discrete analog of the continuous Weibull distribution. It models primarily random variables concerning time to failure or time between events, particularly when that time is measured in discrete units. The discrete Weibull distribution is infinitely divisible only for $0<\beta \leq 1$.

== Alternative parametrizations ==
The original paper by Nakagawa and Osaki used the parametrization $p = q^{k^{-\beta}}$ making the cumulative distribution function $1-q^{(x+1)^\beta}$with $q \in (0,1)$ and the probability mass function $q^{k^{\beta}}- q^{(k+1)^\beta}$. Setting $\beta=1$ makes the relationship with the geometric distribution apparent.

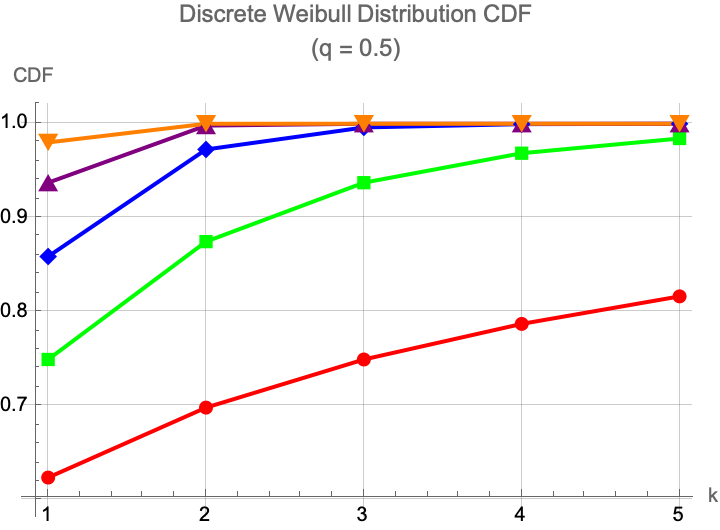
The CDF of the Discrete Weibull Distribution with a q value of 0.5 and k values of 1 through 5. The B values are as follows: Red = 0.5, Green = 1.0, Blue = 1.5, Purple = 2.0, Orange = 2.5.

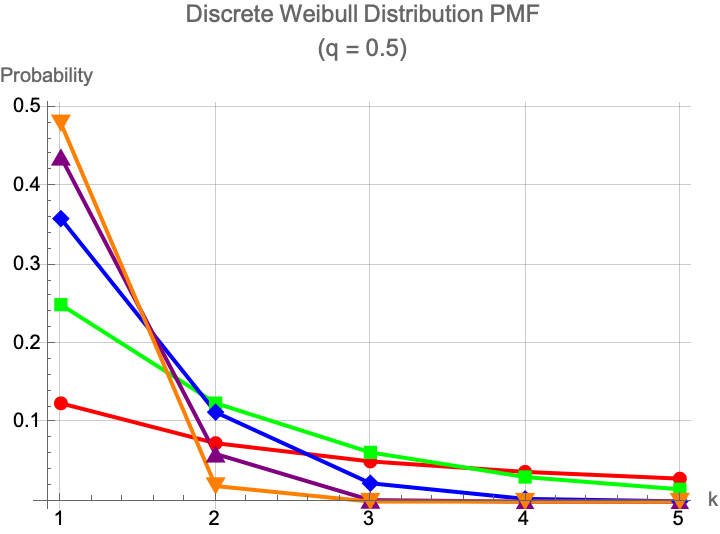
The PMF of the Discrete Weibull Distribution with a q value of 0.5 and k values of 1 through 5. The B values are as follows: Red = 0.5, Green = 1.0, Blue = 1.5, Purple = 2.0, Orange = 2.5.

An alternative parametrization — related to the Pareto distribution — has been used to estimate parameters in infectious disease modelling. This parametrization introduces a parameter $\kappa=\frac{\beta}{\alpha^\beta}$, meaning that the term $\left(\frac{1}{\alpha}\right)^\beta$ can be replaced with $\frac{\kappa}{\beta}$. Therefore, the probability mass function can be expressed as

$$\exp\left[-\frac{\kappa x^\beta}{\beta} \right] - \exp\left[-\frac{\kappa \left(x+1 \right)^\beta}{\beta} \right]$$,

and the cumulative mass function can be expressed as

$$1-\exp\left[-\frac{\kappa \left(x+1 \right)^\beta}{\beta} \right]$$.

== Location-scale transformation ==
The continuous Weibull distribution has a close relationship with the Gumbel distribution which is easy to see when log-transforming the variable. A similar transformation can be made on the discrete Weibull.

Define $e^Y-1 = X$ where (unconventionally) $Y =\log(X+1)\in \{ \log(1), \log(2), \ldots \}$ and define parameters $\mu = \log(\alpha)$ and $\sigma = \frac{1}{\beta}$. By replacing $x$ in the cumulative mass function:

$$\Pr(X\leq x) = \Pr(X\leq e^y-1).$$

We see that we get a location-scale parametrization:

$$= 1-\exp\left[-\left(\frac{x+1}{\alpha}\right)^\beta			\right]
= 1-\exp\left[-\left(\frac{e^y}{e^\mu} \right)^\frac{1}{\sigma}	\right]
= 1-\exp\left[-\exp\left[\frac{y-\mu}{\sigma}\right]			\right]$$

which in estimation settings makes a lot of sense. This opens up the possibility of regression with frameworks developed for Weibull regression and extreme-value-theory.

== Applications ==
Examples of applications of the discrete Weibull distribution include:

- Modeling time to failure over discrete time units
- Modeling count data
- Modeling infectious disease

== See also ==
- Weibull distribution
- Geometric distribution
- q-Weibull distribution
