= Falsen (noble family) =

Noble Family

- Nobility
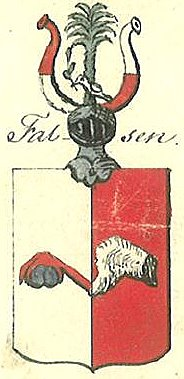
- The coat of arms of Falsen. drawn circa 1820
- Country: Denmark; Norway
- Origin: Zealand
- Founded: 1758 (noble status)
- Founder: Falle Pedersen
- Connected families: Weibull

The Falsen family, also de Falsen, is a Danish and Norwegian noble family.

== History ==
The family descends from Falle Pedersen (1625–1702), who lived on the farm Østrup on Sealand, Denmark. The Falsen family share the same roots as the famous Scanian family Weibull.

Falle Pedersen's son Enevold Falsen (1686–1769) was Mayor of Copenhagen. He was in 1758 ennobled under the name de Falsen. His son Christian Magnus de Falsen (1719–1799) became a justitiarius in Akershus, Norway. He was the father of the author and the official Enevold de Falsen (1755–1808). Enevold was the father of the statesman Christian Magnus Falsen (‘Father of the Constitution’), County Governor Carl Valentin Falsen, and Rear Admiral Jørgen Conrad de Falsen.

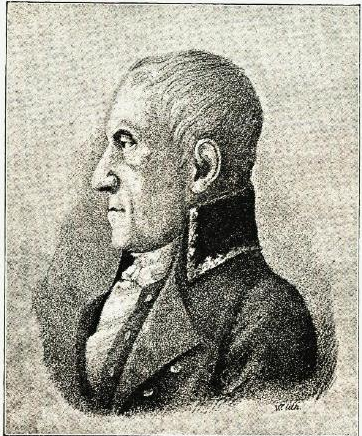
Enevold de Falsen

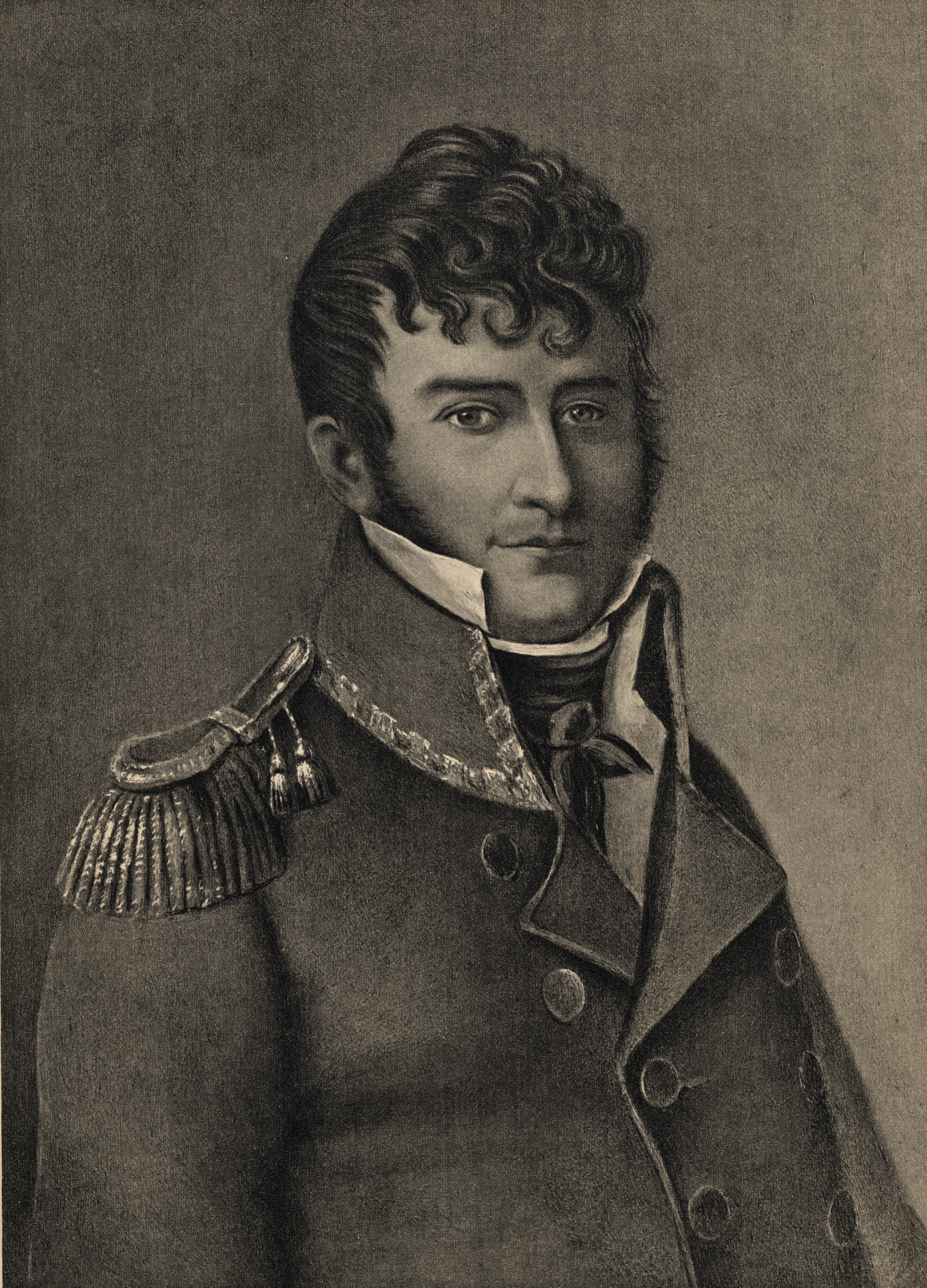
Christian Magnus Falsen

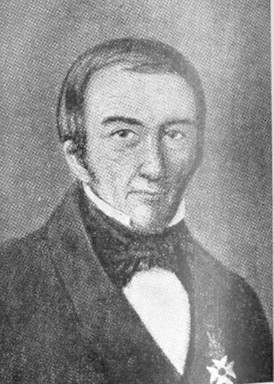
Carl Valentin Falsen

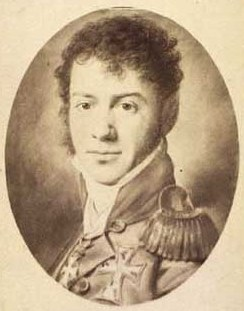
Jørgen Conrad de Falsen

== Curiosa ==
Upon Norway's constitutional independence in 1814, Christian Magnus Falsen presented several proposals for the country's new flag.

Proposal 8

Proposal 15

== Literature ==
- Achen, Sven Tito (1973): Danske adelsvåbener
- Cappelen, Hans (1969): Norske slektsvåpen
- Løvenskiold, Herman Leopoldus (1978): Heraldisk nøkkel
- Munthe, C.M. (1928): Norske slegtsmerker
- Nissen, Harald, and Aase, Monica (1990): Segl i Universitetsbiblioteket i Trondheim
- Steffens, Haagen Krog (1911): Norske Slægter 1912
- Storck, H. (1910): Dansk Vaabenbog
- Thiset, A. Thiset, and Wittrup, P.L. (1904): Nyt dansk Adelslexikon
