= Unit Weibull distribution =

Continuous probability distribution

Unit Weibull
- Probability density function

- Cumulative distribution function
- Parameters: $\alpha >0\,$ (real) $\beta >0\,$ (real)
- Support: $x \in (0,1)\,$
- PDF: $\frac{1}{x} \, \alpha \, \beta \, (-\log x)^{\beta - 1} \exp \left[ -\alpha \, (-\log x)^{\beta} \right]$
- CDF: $\exp \left[ -\alpha \, (-\log x)^{\beta} \right]$
- Quantile: $\exp \left[ -\left( \frac{-\log p}{\alpha} \right)^{\frac{1}{\beta}} \right], \quad 0 < p < 1$
- Skewness: $\frac{\mu'_3 - 3\mu'_2 \mu + \mu^3}{\sigma^3}$
- Excess kurtosis: $\frac{\mu'_4 - 4\mu'_3 \mu + 6\mu'_2 \mu^2 - 3\mu^4}{\sigma^4}$
- MGF: $\sum_{n=0}^{\infty} \frac{(-1)^n}{n! \, \alpha^{n/\beta}} \, \Gamma\left( \frac{n}{\beta} + 1 \right)$

The unit-Weibull distribution (UW) is a continuous probability distribution with domain on $(0,1)$. Useful for indices and rates, or bounded variables with a $(0,1)$ domain. It was originally proposed by Mazucheli et al using a transformation of the Weibull distribution.

== Definitions ==
=== Probability density function ===
Its probability density function is defined as:

$$f(x; \alpha, \beta) = \frac{1}{x} \, \alpha \, \beta \, (-\log x)^{\beta - 1} \exp \left[ -\alpha \, (-\log x)^{\beta} \right]$$

=== Cumulative distribution function ===
And its cumulative distribution function is:

$$F(x; \alpha, \beta) = \exp \left[ -\alpha \, (-\log x)^{\beta} \right]$$

=== Quantile function ===
The quantile function of the UW distribution is given by:

$$Q(p) = \exp \left[ -\left( \frac{-\log p}{\alpha} \right)^{\frac{1}{\beta}} \right], \quad 0 < p < 1.$$

Having a closed form expression for the quantile function, may make it a more flexible alternative for a quantile regression model against the classical Beta regression model.

== Properties ==
=== Moments ===
The $r$th raw moment of the UW distribution can be obtained through:

$$\mu'_r = \mathbb{E}(X^r) = \mathbb{E}(e^{-rY}) = M_Y(-r) = \sum_{n=0}^{\infty} \frac{(-1)^n}{n! \, \alpha^{n/\beta}} \, \Gamma\left( \frac{n}{\beta} + 1 \right).$$

=== Skewness and kurtosis ===
The skewness and kurtosis measures can be obtained upon substituting the raw moments from the expressions:

$$\mathit{skewness} = \frac{\mu'_3 - 3\mu'_2 \mu + \mu^3}{\sigma^3},
\mathit{kurtosis} = \frac{\mu'_4 - 4\mu'_3 \mu + 6\mu'_2 \mu^2 - 3\mu^4}{\sigma^4}$$

=== Hazard rate ===
The hazard rate function of the UW distribution is given by:

$$h(x; \alpha, \beta) = \frac{f(x; \alpha, \beta)}{1 - F(x; \alpha, \beta)}
= \frac{\alpha \beta \, (-\log x)^{\beta - 1} \exp \left[ -\alpha (-\log x)^{\beta} \right]}{x \left( 1 - \exp \left[ -\alpha (-\log x)^{\beta} \right] \right)},
\quad 0 < x < 1.$$

== Parameter estimation ==
Let $\mathbf{x} = (x_1, \ldots, x_n)$ be a random sample of size $n$ from the UW distribution with probability density function defined before. Then, the log-likelihood function of $\boldsymbol{\theta} = (\alpha, \beta)$ is:

$$\begin{align}
\ell(\boldsymbol{\theta}; \mathbf{x})
&= n(\log \alpha + \log \beta) - \sum_{i=1}^{n} \log x_i
+ (\beta - 1) \sum_{i=1}^{n} \log(-\log x_i)
- \alpha \sum_{i=1}^{n} (-\log x_i)^{\beta}
\end{align}$$

The likelihood estimate $\hat{\boldsymbol{\theta}}$ of $\boldsymbol{\theta}$ is obtained by solving the non-linear equations

$$\frac{\partial \ell}{\partial \alpha} = \frac{n}{\alpha} - \sum_{i=1}^{n} (-\log x_i)^{\beta} = 0,$$

and

$$\frac{\partial \ell}{\partial \beta} = \frac{n}{\beta} + \sum_{i=1}^{n} \log(-\log x_i)
- \alpha \sum_{i=1}^{n} (-\log x_i)^{\beta} \log(-\log x_i) = 0.$$

The expected Fisher information matrix of $\boldsymbol{\theta} = (\alpha, \beta)$ based on a single observation is given by

$$\mathbf{I}(\boldsymbol{\theta}) = [I_{ij}] =
\begin{pmatrix}
\frac{1}{\alpha} & \frac{1}{\alpha \beta}(1 - \gamma - \log \alpha) \\
\frac{1}{\alpha \beta}(1 - \gamma - \log \alpha) & \frac{1}{\beta^2} \left[ \frac{\pi^2}{6} + (1 - \gamma - \log \alpha)^2 \right]
\end{pmatrix},$$

where $\pi \simeq 3.141593$ and $\gamma \simeq 0.577216$ is the Euler’s constant.

== Special cases and related distributions ==
When $\beta = 1$, $x$ follows the power function distribution and the $r$th raw moment of the UW distribution becomes:

$$\mu'_r = \mathbb{E}(X^r) = \frac{\alpha}{r + \alpha}, \quad r = 1, 2, \ldots.$$

In this case, the mean, variance, skewness and kurtosis, are:

$$\mu = \frac{\alpha}{1 + \alpha}, \qquad
\sigma^2 = \frac{\alpha}{(1 + \alpha)^2 (2 + \alpha)},$$

$$\textit{skewness} = \frac{2(1 - \alpha)}{(2 + \alpha)} \sqrt{1 + \frac{2}{\alpha}}, \qquad
\textit{kurtosis} = \frac{3(2 + \alpha)(2 - \alpha + 3\alpha^2)}{\alpha (3 + \alpha)(4 + \alpha)}.$$

The skewness can be negative, zero, or positive when $\alpha < 1, \alpha = 1, \alpha > 1$. And if $\alpha = 1$, with $\beta = 1$, $x$ follows the standard uniform distribution, and the measures becomes:

$$\mu = \frac{1}{2}, \qquad
\sigma^2 = \frac{1}{12}, \qquad
\textit{skewness} = 0, \quad \textit{kurtosis} = \frac{9}{5}.$$

For the case of $\beta = 2$, $x$ follows the unit-Rayleigh distribution, and:

$$\mu'_r = \mathbb{E}(X^r) = 1 - \frac{\sqrt{\pi}}{2\sqrt{\alpha}} \, r \, e^{r^2 / (4\alpha)} \,
\mathrm{erfc} \left( \frac{r}{2\sqrt{\alpha}} \right), \qquad r = 1, 2, \ldots,$$

where

$$\mathrm{erfc}(z) = \frac{2}{\sqrt{\pi}} \int_z^{\infty} e^{-x^2} \, dx, \qquad z > 0,$$

Is the complementary error function. In this case, the measures of the distribution are:

$$\mu = 1 - \frac{\sqrt{\pi}}{2\sqrt{\alpha}} \, e^{1/\alpha} \,
\mathrm{erfc} \left( \frac{1}{2\sqrt{\alpha}} \right),
\sigma^2 = 1 - \frac{\sqrt{\pi}}{\sqrt{\alpha}} \, e^{1/\alpha} \,
\mathrm{erfc} \left( \frac{1}{\sqrt{\alpha}} \right)
- \left[ 1 - \frac{\sqrt{\pi}}{2\sqrt{\alpha}} \, e^{1/\alpha} \,
\mathrm{erfc} \left( \frac{1}{2\sqrt{\alpha}} \right) \right]^2.$$

== Applications ==
It was shown to outperform, against other distributions, like the Beta and Kumaraswamy distributions, in: maximum flood level, petroleum reservoirs, risk management cost effectiveness, and recovery rate of CD34+cells data.

== See also ==
- Weibull distribution
