= Benktander type I distribution =

Probability distribution in actuarial science

Benktander distribution of the first kind
- Parameters: $a>0$ (real) $0 < b \leq \frac{a(a+1)}{2}$ (real)
- Support: $x\geq 1$
- PDF: $\left(\left[\left(1+\frac{2b\log x}{a}\right)\left(1+a+2b\log x\right)\right]-\frac{2b}{a}\right)x^{-\left(2+a+b\log x\right)}$
- CDF: $1 - \left(1+\frac{2b\log x}{a}\right)x^{-\left(a + 1 + b\log x\right)}$
- Mean: $1+\tfrac{1}{a}$
- Variance: $\frac{-\sqrt{b}+ae^{\frac{(a-1)^2}{4b}}\sqrt{\pi}\;\textrm{erfc}\left(\frac{a-1}{2\sqrt{b}}\right)}{a^2\sqrt{b}}$ (Note: From Wolfram Alpha)

The Benktander type I distribution is one of two distributions introduced by Gunnar Benktander (1970) to model heavy-tailed losses commonly found in non-life/casualty actuarial science, using various forms of mean excess functions (Benktander & Segerdahl 1960). The distribution of the first type is "close" to the log-normal distribution (Kleiber & Kotz 2003).

== See also ==
- log-normal distribution
- Benktander type II distribution
