= Vittskövle =

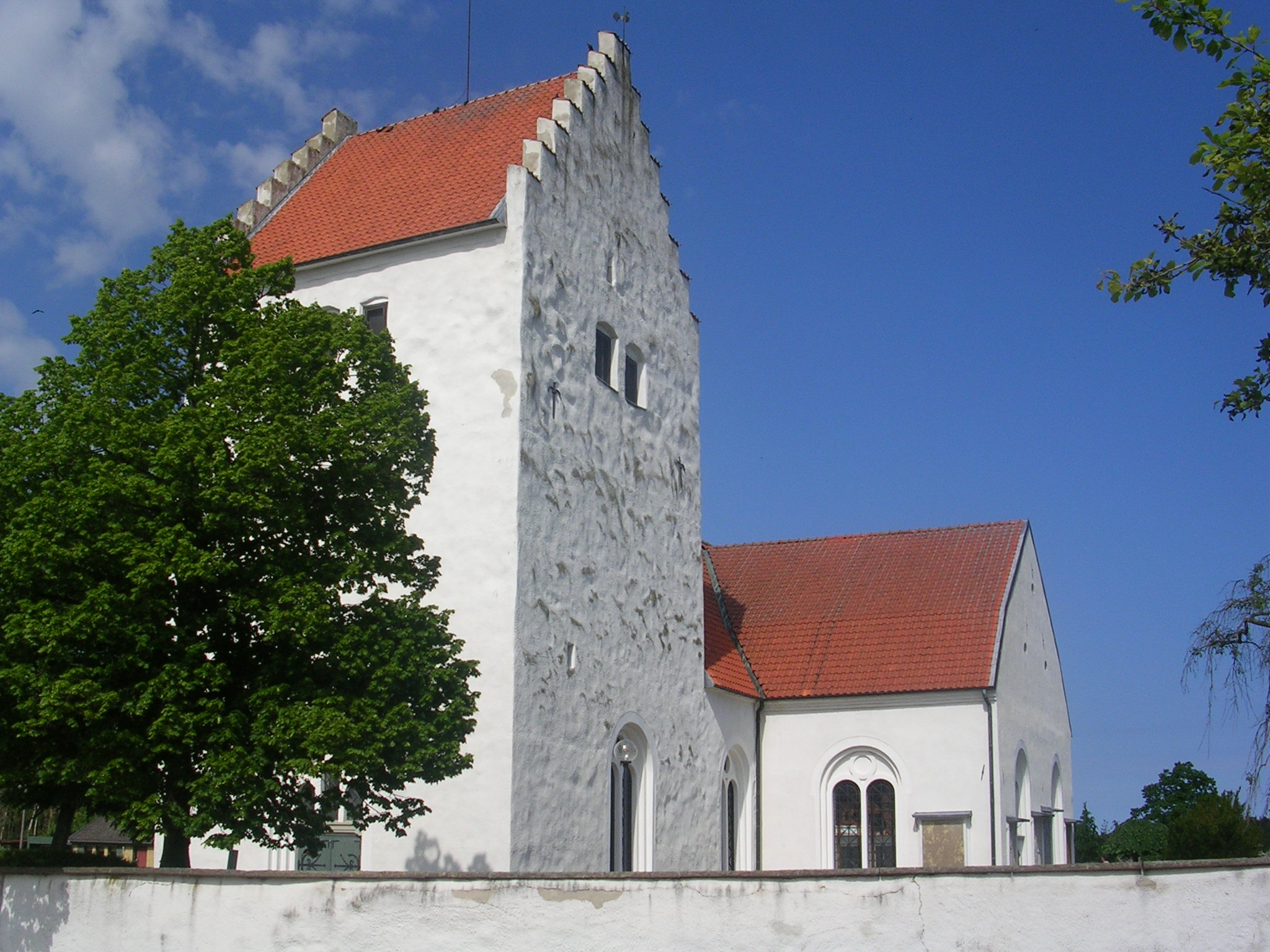
- Vittskövle church

- Location within Skåne Location within Sweden
- Coordinates: 55°52′N 14°09′E
- Country: Sweden
- Province: Skåne
- County: Skåne County
- Municipality: Kristianstad Municipality

Area
  - Total: 0.40 km^{2} (0.15 sq mi)

Population (31 December 2010)
  - Total: 235
  - Density: 582/km^{2} (1,510/sq mi)
- Time zone: UTC+1 (CET)
  - Summer (DST): UTC+2 (CEST)

Vittskövle is a locality situated in Kristianstad Municipality, Skåne County, Sweden with 235 inhabitants in 2010.

== Notable people ==
Waloddi Weibull
