= Waloddi Weibull =

Swedish mathematician (1887–1979)

Ernst Hjalmar Waloddi Weibull
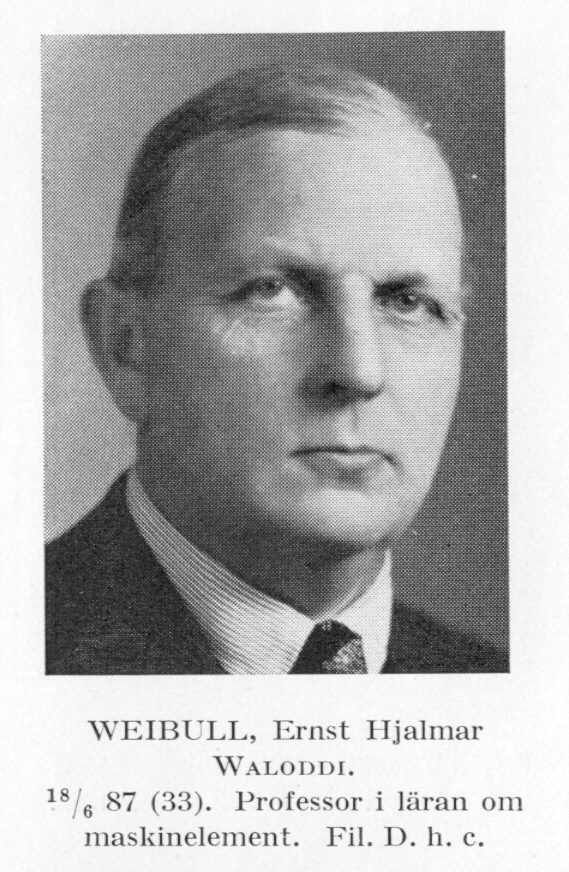
- Born: 18 June 1887; Vittskövle, Sweden
- Died: 12 October 1979 (aged 92); Annecy, France
- Education: Royal Institute of Technology (1924), University of Uppsala (1932)
- Known for: Weibull distribution Fracture mechanics
- Awards: American Society of Mechanical Engineers gold medal (1972); Royal Swedish Academy of Engineering Sciences Great Gold medal (1978).
- Scientific career
- Fields: Engineering, mathematics
- Workplaces: Royal Institute of Technology

Ernst Hjalmar Waloddi Weibull (18 June 1887 – 12 October 1979) was a Swedish engineer, materials scientist, and applied mathematician. The Weibull distribution is named after him.

== Education and career ==
Weibull was born 18 June 1887 in the town of Vittskövle in Sweden. (The family originated from the village "Weibøl/Vedbøl" in Haderslev, Denmark.) He joined the Swedish Coast Guard in 1905 as a midshipman. He moved up the ranks with promotion to sublieutenant in 1907, Captain in 1916 and Major in 1940. While in the coast guard he took courses at the Royal Institute of Technology. In 1924 he graduated and became a full professor. He obtained his doctorate from the University of Uppsala in 1932. He was employed in Swedish and German industry as a consulting engineer.

In 1914, while on expeditions to the Mediterranean, the Caribbean and the Pacific Ocean on the research ship Albatross, Weibull wrote his first paper on the propagation of explosive waves. He developed the technique of using explosive charges to determine the type of ocean bottom sediments and their thickness. The same technique is still used today in offshore oil exploration.

== Research contributions ==
In 1939 he published his paper on the Weibull distribution in probability theory and statistics. In 1941 he received a personal research professorship in Engineering Physics at the Royal Institute of Technology in Stockholm from the arms producer Bofors.

Weibull published many papers on strength of materials, fatigue, rupture in solids, bearings, and of course, the Weibull distribution, as well as one book on fatigue analysis in 1961. 27 of these papers were reports to the US Air Force at Wilbur Wright Field on Weibull analysis.

In 1951 he presented his paper on the Weibull distribution to the American Society of Mechanical Engineers (ASME), using seven case studies.

== Legacy ==
The American Society of Mechanical Engineers awarded Weibull their gold medal in 1972. The Great Gold Medal from the Royal Swedish Academy of Engineering Sciences was personally presented to him by King Carl XVI Gustaf of Sweden in 1978.

== Personal life ==
Weibull came from a family that had strong ties to Scania. He was a cousin of the historian brothers Lauritz, Carl Gustaf and Curt Weibull. Weibull died on 12 October 1979 in Annecy, France.
