= Weibull modulus =

Dimensionless parameter of the Weibull distribution

The Weibull modulus is a dimensionless parameter of the Weibull distribution. It represents the width of a probability density function (PDF) in which a higher modulus is a characteristic of a narrower distribution of values. Use case examples include biological and brittle material failure analysis, where modulus is used to describe the variability of failure strength for materials.

== Definition ==
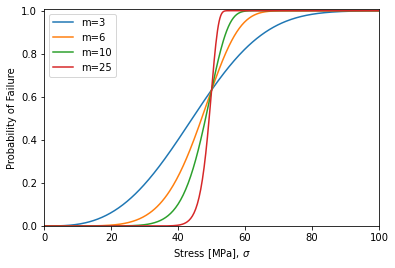
CDF of Weibull distribution for the example of predicting failure in materials, σ_{0}= 50 MPa

The Weibull distribution, represented as a cumulative distribution function (CDF), is defined by:

$F(x)=1-\exp\left(-\left(\frac{x-x_u}{x_0}\right)^m\right)$

in which m is the Weibull modulus. $x_0$ is a parameter found during the fit of data to the Weibull distribution and represents an input value for which ~67% of the data is encompassed. As m increases, the CDF distribution more closely resembles a step function at $x_0$, which correlates with a sharper peak in the probability density function (PDF) defined by:

$f(x)=\left(\frac{m}{x_0}\right)\left(\frac{x-x_u}{x_0}\right)^{m-1}\exp\left(-\left(\frac{x-x_u}{x_0}\right)^m\right)$

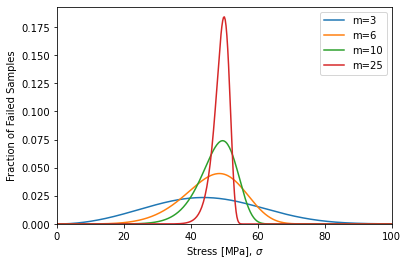
PDF of Weibull distribution for the example of predicting failure in materials, σ_{0}= 50 MPa

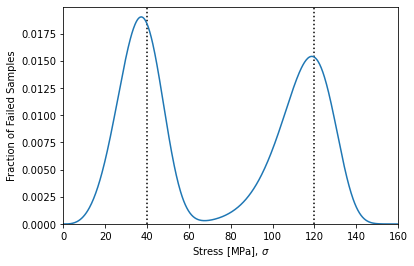
PDF of a bimodal Weibull distribution with Weibull Moduli of 4 and 10 and characteristic strengths of 40 and 120 MPa

Failure analysis often uses this distribution, as a CDF of the probability of failure F of a sample, as a function of applied stress σ, in the form:

$F(\sigma)=1-\exp\left[-\left(\frac{\sigma}{\sigma_0}\right)^m\right]$

Failure stress of the sample, σ, is substituted for the $x$ property in the above equation. The initial property $x_u$ is assumed to be 0, an unstressed, equilibrium state of the material.

In the plotted figure of the Weibull CDF, it is worth noting that the plotted functions all intersect at a stress value of 50 MPa, the characteristic strength for the distributions, even though the value of the Weibull moduli vary. It is also worth noting in the plotted figure of the Weibull PDF that a higher Weibull modulus results in a steeper slope within the plot.

The Weibull distribution can also be multi-modal, in which there would be multiple reported $x_0$ values and multiple reported moduli, m. The CDF for a bimodal Weibull distribution has the following form, when applied to materials failure analysis:

$F(\sigma)=1-\phi\exp\left[-\left(\frac{\sigma}{\sigma_{01}}\right)^{m_1}\right] -(1-\phi)\exp\left[-\left(\frac{\sigma}{\sigma_{02}}\right)^{m_2}\right]$

This represents a material which fails by two different modes. In this equation m_{1} is the modulus for the first mode, and m_{2} is the modulus for the second mode. Φ is the fraction of the sample set which fail by the first mode. The corresponding PDF is defined by:$f(\sigma)=\phi\left(\frac{m_1}{\sigma_{01}}\right)\left(\frac{\sigma}{\sigma_{01}}\right)^{m_1-1}\exp\left[-\left(\frac{\sigma}{\sigma_{01}}\right)^{m_1}\right]+(1-\phi)\left(\frac{m_2}{\sigma_{02}}\right)\left(\frac{\sigma}{\sigma_{02}}\right)^{m_2-1}\exp\left[-\left(\frac{\sigma}{\sigma_{02}}\right)^{m_2}\right]$

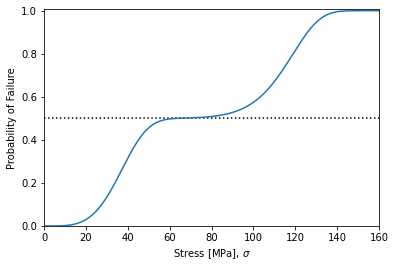
CDF of a bimodal Weibull distribution with Weibull Moduli of 4 and 10 and characteristic strengths of 40 and 120 MPa

Examples of a bimodal Weibull PDF and CDF are plotted in the figures of this article with values of the characteristic strength being 40 and 120 MPa, the Weibull moduli being 4 and 10, and the value of Φ is 0.5, corresponding to 50% of the specimens failing by each failure mode.

== Linearization of the CDF ==
The complement of the cumulative Weibull distribution function can be expressed as:

$P=1-F$

Where P corresponds to the probability of survival of a specimen for a given stress value. Thus, it follows that:

$P(\sigma)=1 - \left[ 1 - \exp\left[-(\frac{\sigma}{\sigma_0})^m\right]\right]=\exp\left[-(\frac{\sigma}{\sigma_0})^m\right]$

where m is the Weibull modulus. If the probability is plotted vs the stress, we find that the graph is sigmoidal, as shown in the figure above. Taking advantage of the fact that the exponential is the base of the natural logarithm, the above equation can be rearranged to:

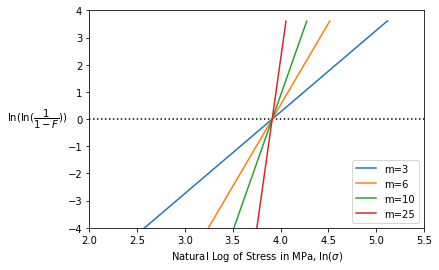
The linearization of the Weibull CDFs shown above.

$\ln \left[\ln\left (\frac{1}{1-F} \right)\right]= \ln \left[\left (\frac{\sigma}{\sigma_0} \right)^m\right]$

Which, using the properties of logarithms, can also be expressed as:

$\ln \left[\ln\left (\frac{1}{1-F} \right)\right]= m\ln(\sigma)-m\ln(\sigma_0)$

When the left side of this equation is plotted as a function of the natural logarithm of stress, a linear plot can be created which has a slope of the Weibull modulus, m, and an x-intercept of $\ln(\sigma_0)$.

Looking at the plotted linearization of the CDFs from above it can be seen that all of the lines intersect the x-axis at the same point because all of the functions have the same value of the characteristic strength. The slopes vary because of the differing values of the Weibull moduli.

== Measurement ==
Standards organizations have created multiple standards for measuring and reporting values of Weibull parameters, along with other statistical analyses of strength data:

- ASTM C1239-13: Standard Practice for Reporting Uniaxial Strength Data and Estimating Weibull Distribution Parameters for Advanced Ceramics
- ASTM D7846-21: Standard Practice for Reporting Uniaxial Strength Data and Estimating Weibull Distribution Parameters for Advanced Graphites
- ISO 20501:2019 Fine Ceramics (Advanced Ceramics, Advanced Technical Ceramics) - Weibull Statistics for Strength Data
- ANSI DIN EN 843-5:2007 Advanced Technical Ceramics - Mechanical Properties of Monolithic Ceramics at Room Temperature - Part 5: Statistical Analysis

When applying a Weibull distribution to a set of data the data points must first be put in ranked order. For the use case of failure analysis specimens' failure strengths are ranked in ascending order, i.e. from lowest to greatest strength. A probability of failure is then assigned to each failure strength measured, ASTM C1239-13 uses the following formula:

$F(\sigma)=\frac{i-0.5}{N}$

where $i$ is the specimen number as ranked and $N$ is the total number of specimens in the sample. From there $F$ can be plotted against failure strength to obtain a Weibull CDF. The Weibull parameters, modulus and characteristic strength, can be obtained from fitting or using the linearization method detailed above.

== Example uses from published work ==
Weibull statistics are often used for ceramics and other brittle materials. In materials engineering, Weibull modulus serves as an important indicator of reliability and its value has been compiled for over 370 materials. For example, in structural glass fibers, Weibull modulus was reported to range from 2.3 to 7. They have also been applied to other fields as well such as meteorology where wind speeds are often described using Weibull statistics.

=== Ceramics and brittle materials ===
For ceramics and other brittle materials, the maximum stress that a sample can be measured to withstand before failure may vary from specimen to specimen, even under identical testing conditions. This is related to the distribution of physical flaws present in the surface or body of the brittle specimen, since brittle failure processes originate at these weak points. Much work has been done to describe brittle failure with the field of linear elastic fracture mechanics and specifically with the development of the ideas of the stress intensity factor and Griffith Criterion. When flaws are consistent and evenly distributed, samples will behave more uniformly than when flaws are clustered inconsistently. This must be taken into account when describing the strength of the material, so strength is best represented as a distribution of values rather than as one specific value.

Consider strength measurements made on many small samples of a brittle ceramic material. If the measurements show little variation from sample to sample, the calculated Weibull modulus will be high, and a single strength value would serve as a good description of the sample-to-sample performance. It may be concluded that its physical flaws, whether inherent to the material itself or resulting from the manufacturing process, are distributed uniformly throughout the material. If the measurements show high variation, the calculated Weibull modulus will be low; this reveals that flaws are clustered inconsistently, and the measured strength will be generally weak and variable. Products made from components of low Weibull modulus will exhibit low reliability and their strengths will be broadly distributed. With careful manufacturing processes Weibull moduli of up to 98 have been seen for 25-mm long optical fibers tested in tension.

A table is provided with the Weibull moduli for several common materials. The Weibull modulus is a fitting parameter from strength data, and therefore the reported value may vary from source to source. It also is specific to the sample preparation and testing method, and subject to change if the analysis or manufacturing process changes.

Table of Weibull Moduli for Common Materials
Material	Weibull Modulus
Silicon Nitride	20
Silicon Carbide	18
Aluminum Nitride	10
Aluminum Oxide (98%)	10
Aluminum Oxide (99%)	10
Zirconia Toughened Alumina (ZTA)	13
Boron Carbide	12
Titanium Diboride	11
Zirconia	15

=== Organic materials ===
Studies examining organic brittle materials highlight the consistency and variability of the Weibull modulus within naturally occurring ceramics such as human dentin and abalone nacre. Research on human dentin samples indicates that the Weibull modulus remains stable across different depths or locations within the tooth, with an average value of approximately 4.5 and a range between 3 and 6. Variations in the modulus suggest differences in flaw populations between individual teeth, thought to be caused by random defects introduced during specimen preparation. Speculation exists regarding a potential decrease in the Weibull modulus with age due to changes in flaw distribution and stress sensitivity. Failure in dentin typically initiates at these flaws, which can be intrinsic or extrinsic in origin, arising from factors such as cavity preparation, wear, damage, or cyclic loading.

Studies on the abalone shell illustrate its unique structural adaptations, sacrificing tensile strength perpendicular to its structure to enhance strength parallel to the tile arrangement. The Weibull modulus of abalone nacre samples is determined to be 1.8, indicating a moderate degree of variability in strength among specimens.

=== Quasi-brittle materials ===
The Weibull modulus of quasi-brittle materials correlates with the decline in the slope of the energy barrier spectrum, as established in fracture mechanics models. This relationship allows for the determination of both the fracture energy barrier spectrum decline slope and the Weibull modulus, while keeping factors like crack interaction and defect-induced degradation in consideration. Temperature dependence and variations due to crack interactions or stress field interactions are observed in the Weibull modulus of quasi-brittle materials. Damage accumulation leads to a rapid decrease in the Weibull modulus, resulting in a right-shifted distribution with a smaller Weibull modulus as damage increases.

=== Quality analysis ===
Weibull analysis is also used in quality control and "life analysis" for products. A higher Weibull modulus allows for companies to more confidently predict the life of their product for use in determining warranty periods.

== Other methods of characterization for brittle materials ==
A further method to determine the strength of brittle materials has been described by the Wikibook contribution Weakest link determination by use of three parameter Weibull statistics.
