= Exponentiated Weibull distribution =

Probability distribution

Exponentiated Weibull (3-parameter)
- Parameters: $\lambda\in (0, +\infty)\,$ scale $k\in (0, +\infty)\,$ shape $\alpha\in (0, +\infty)\,$ shape
- Support: $x \in [0, +\infty)\,$
- PDF: $$f(x)=\begin{cases} \frac{\alpha k}{\lambda}\left(\frac{x}{\lambda}\right)^{k-1}\left(1-e^{-(x/\lambda)^k}\right)^{\alpha-1} e^{-(x/\lambda)^k}, & x\geq0,\\ 0, & x<0.\end{cases}$$
- CDF: $$F(x)=\begin{cases}\left(1 - e^{-(x/\lambda)^k}\right)^\alpha, & x\geq0,\\ 0, & x<0.\end{cases}$$
- Quantile: $Q(p)=\lambda(-\ln(1-p^{1/\alpha}))^\frac{1}{k}$
- Mean: $\lambda\alpha \, \int_0^\infty u^{1/k}(1-e^{-u})^{\alpha-1}e^{-u}du\,$
- Median: $\lambda(-\ln(1-0.5^{1/\alpha}))^{1/k}\,$

In statistics, the exponentiated Weibull family of probability distributions was introduced by Mudholkar and Srivastava (1993) as an extension of the Weibull family obtained by adding a second shape parameter.

The cumulative distribution function for the exponentiated Weibull distribution is

$$F(x;k,\lambda; \alpha) = \left[ 1- e^{-(x/\lambda)^k} \right]^\alpha  \,$$

for x > 0, and F(x; k; λ; α) = 0 for x < 0. Here k > 0 is the first shape parameter, α > 0 is the second shape parameter and λ > 0 is the scale parameter of the distribution.

The density is

$$f(x;k,\lambda; \alpha) =
\alpha
\frac{k}{\lambda}
\left[\frac{x}{\lambda}\right]^{k-1}
\left[1- e^{-(x/\lambda)^k} \right]^{\alpha-1}
e^{-(x/\lambda)^k}
\,$$

There are two important special cases:

- α = 1 gives the Weibull distribution;
- k = 1 gives the exponentiated exponential distribution.

== Background ==
The family of distributions accommodates unimodal, bathtub shaped* and monotone failure rates. A similar distribution was introduced in 1984 by Zacks, called a Weibull-exponential distribution (Zacks 1984). Crevecoeur introduced it in assessing the reliability of ageing mechanical devices and showed that it accommodates bathtub shaped failure rates (1993, 1994). Mudholkar, Srivastava, and Kollia (1996) applied the generalized Weibull distribution to model survival data. They showed that the distribution has increasing, decreasing, bathtub, and unimodal hazard functions. Mudholkar, Srivastava, and Freimer (1995), Mudholkar and Hutson (1996) and Nassar and Eissa (2003) studied various properties of the exponentiated Weibull distribution. Mudholkar et al. (1995) applied the exponentiated Weibull distribution to model failure data. Mudholkar and Hutson (1996) applied the exponentiated Weibull distribution to extreme value data. They showed that the exponentiated Weibull distribution has increasing, decreasing, bathtub, and unimodal hazard rates. The exponentiated exponential distribution proposed by Gupta and Kundu (1999, 2001) is a special case of the exponentiated Weibull family. Later, the moments of the EW distribution were derived by Choudhury (2005). Also, M. Pal, M.M. Ali, J. Woo (2006) studied the EW distribution and compared it with the two-parameter Weibull and gamma distributions with respect to failure rate.
