= Lauritz Weibull =

Swedish professor and historian

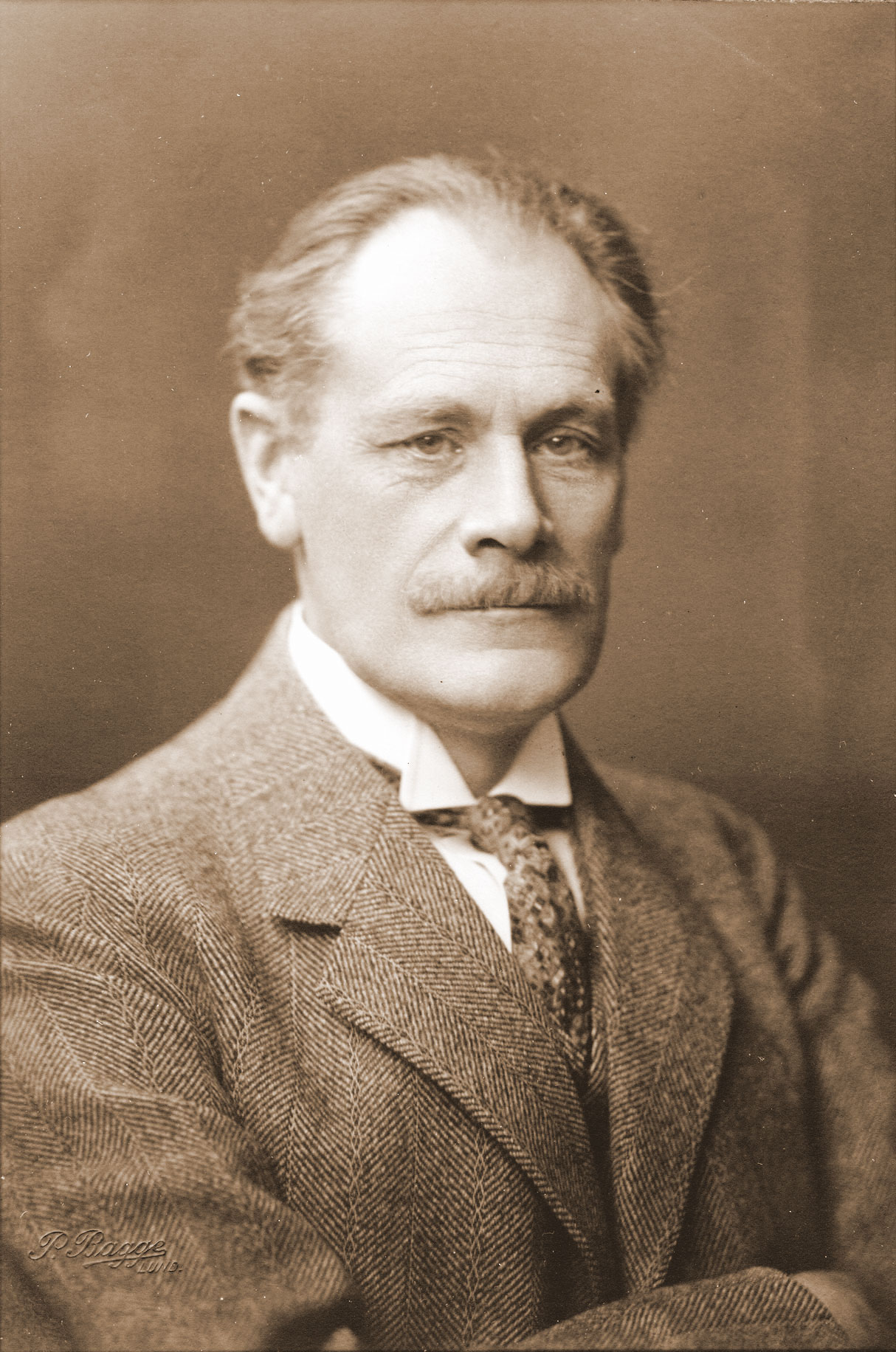
Lauritz Weibull

Lauritz Ulrik Absalon Weibull (2 April 1873 – 2 December 1960) was a Swedish professor and historian.

== Biography ==
He was born in Lund, Sweden, as the son of history professor Martin Weibull and the brother of historian Curt Weibull. He enrolled at the University of Lund in 1892, completed his B.A. in 1894, his licentiate degree in 1899 and defended his dissertation and received a docentship the same year. He was appointed director of the Regional Archives of Lund in 1903 and became professor of history at his alma mater in 1919.

Lauritz Weibull covered a wide range of topics from the early Middle Ages until the 17th and 18th centuries and before finishing his doctoral dissertation, he had already published studies on literary subjects. His dissertation treated a 17th-century topic, De diplomatiska förbindelserna mellan Sverige och Frankrike 1629-1631. Ett bidrag till Gustaf II Adolfs och kardinal Richelieus historia (1899; "The diplomatic relations between Sweden and France 1629-1631. A contribution to the history of Gustavus II Adolphus and Cardinal Richelieu"). In the major history work Sveriges historia intill 20:de seklet, he wrote the section on King Charles X Gustav, partly based on unpublished work by his father.

Weibull is best known for the critical re-evaluation of early Swedish and Scandinavian history that he made in the books Kritiska undersökningar i Nordens historia omkring år 1000 (1911; "Critical investigations in the history of the Nordic region around the year 1000") and Historisk-kritisk metod och nordisk medeltidsforskning (1913; "Historical-critical method and Nordic medieval research"). With his brother Curt, he attempted to put Scandinavian history on firmer ground.

With his father, Weibull initiated the journal Historisk tidskrift för Skåneland, which was published 1901-1921. He later founded the journal Scandia, which has been published since 1928, with Weibull serving as editor until 1957.

== Selected publications ==
- De diplomatiska förbindelserna mellan Sverige och Frankrike 1629-1631. Ett bidrag till Gustaf II Adolfs och kardinal Richelieus historia, 1899
- Bibliotek och arkiv i Skåne under medeltiden (1901)
- Kritiska undersökningar i Nordens historia omkring år 1000 (1911)
- Historisk-kritisk metod och nordisk medeltidsforskning (1913)
- Liber census Daniæ. Kung Valdemars jordabok (1916).
- Diplomatarium dioecesis Lundensis. Lunds ärkestifts urkundsbok (1900-09)
- Diplomatarium civitatis Malmogiensis. Malmö stads urkundsbok (1901-17)
- Sven Lagerbring. Skrifter och bref (1907)
- Nordisk Historia I. Forskningar och undersökningar. Forntid och vikingatid (1948)
- Nordisk Historia II. Forskningar och undersökningar. Stat och kyrka i Danmark under äldre medeltid (1949)
- Nordisk Historia III. Forskningar och undersökningar. Från Erik den helige till Karl XII (1949)

== Studies ==
- Birgitta Odén, Lauritz Weibull och forskarsamhället (Lund, 1975)
- Rolf Torstendahl, En nygammal Weibull-myt. In: Scandia 668:2, ss 321-332 (Lund, 2000)

== Other sources ==
- Nordisk familjebok, vol. 31 (1921), col. 1013 f
