= Poly-Weibull distribution =

Probability distribution

In probability theory and statistics, the poly-Weibull distribution is a continuous probability distribution. The distribution is defined to be that of a random variable defined to be the smallest of a number of statistically independent random variables having non-identical Weibull distributions.
