= Rolf Torstendahl =

- Rolf Torstendahl
- Born: January 9, 1936 (age 90); Jönköping, Sweden
- Occupation: Historian
- Known for: Historiography, bureaucratisation, and the history of the engineering profession

Rolf Torstendahl (born 9 January 1936, Jönköping, Sweden) is a Swedish historian and Professor Emeritus of History at Uppsala University, where he spent the greater part of his academic career. His scholarly work spans three principal areas: the history and theory of historiography, the sociology of professions with particular reference to engineers and historians, and the history of bureaucratisation in modern Europe.

== Education ==
Torstendahl studied at Uppsala University, earning the fil. kand. degree in 1956, the fil. ämbetsexamen in 1957, the fil. licentiatexamen in 1961, and the fil. doktorsgrad (doctorate) in 1964, the year in which he was also awarded the title of docent.

== Academic career ==
Torstendahl began his teaching career as Lecturer in the Department of History at Uppsala University from 1964 to 1967, before being promoted to Associate Professor in 1968, a position he held until 1978. From 1978 to 1980 he served as Sven Warburg Professor of History at Stockholm University, then returned to Uppsala in 1981 as Professor of History, a post he retained until his retirement in 2000, after which he was designated Professor Emeritus.

He also served as Head of the Swedish Collegium for Advanced Study in the Social Sciences (SCASSS) from 1985 to 1990, as Head of the Department of History from 1993 to 1997, and as Dean of the Faculty of Philosophy and History from 1994 to 1999. In 2006 he was awarded an honorary doctorate by the Russian State University for the Humanities in Moscow.

== Visiting fellowships ==
Torstendahl held visiting fellowships and research appointments at a number of international institutions over the course of his career, including the Wissenschaftskolleg zu Berlin in Berlin, the Maison des Sciences de l'Homme in Paris, the British Academy, and the Swedish Collegium for Advanced Study in Uppsala, where he was one of the founding directors.

== Research ==
Torstendahl's research addresses three overlapping themes, developed across a career spanning more than six decades. His work on historiography and the theory of history includes his article "Fact, truth and text: The quest for a firm basis for historical knowledge around 1900," published in History and Theory (2003), and chapters on Scandinavian historical writing contributed to the fourth and fifth volumes of The Oxford History of Historical Writing (Oxford University Press, 2011).

His work on the sociology of professions is represented by his monograph The Rise and Propagation of Historical Professionalism (Routledge, 2015), reviewed in the academic journal Rethinking History.

Two edited volumes he co-edited with Michael Burrage, Professions in Theory and History and The Formation of Professions (Sage, 1990), were jointly reviewed in both the British Journal of Sociology and the Canadian Historical Review.

His later monograph Engineers in Western Europe: Ascent and Decline? (Springer, 2021) examined the formation of the engineering profession across thirteen European countries, extending his earlier national-level studies to a comparative, continent-wide framework.

His research on bureaucratisation and state history includes the comparative study Bureaucratisation in Northwestern Europe, 1880–1985 (Routledge, 1991), reviewed in the Business History Review, and led research projects on policy-making in Sweden and the two German states, and on democratic culture and institutions in Russia.

== Learned society memberships ==
Torstendahl is a member of the Academia Europaea (elected 1989), the Royal Swedish Academy of Letters, History and Antiquities (elected 1986), and the Norwegian Academy of Science and Letters (elected 1989).
