= Curt Weibull =

Swedish historian, educator and author (1886–1991)

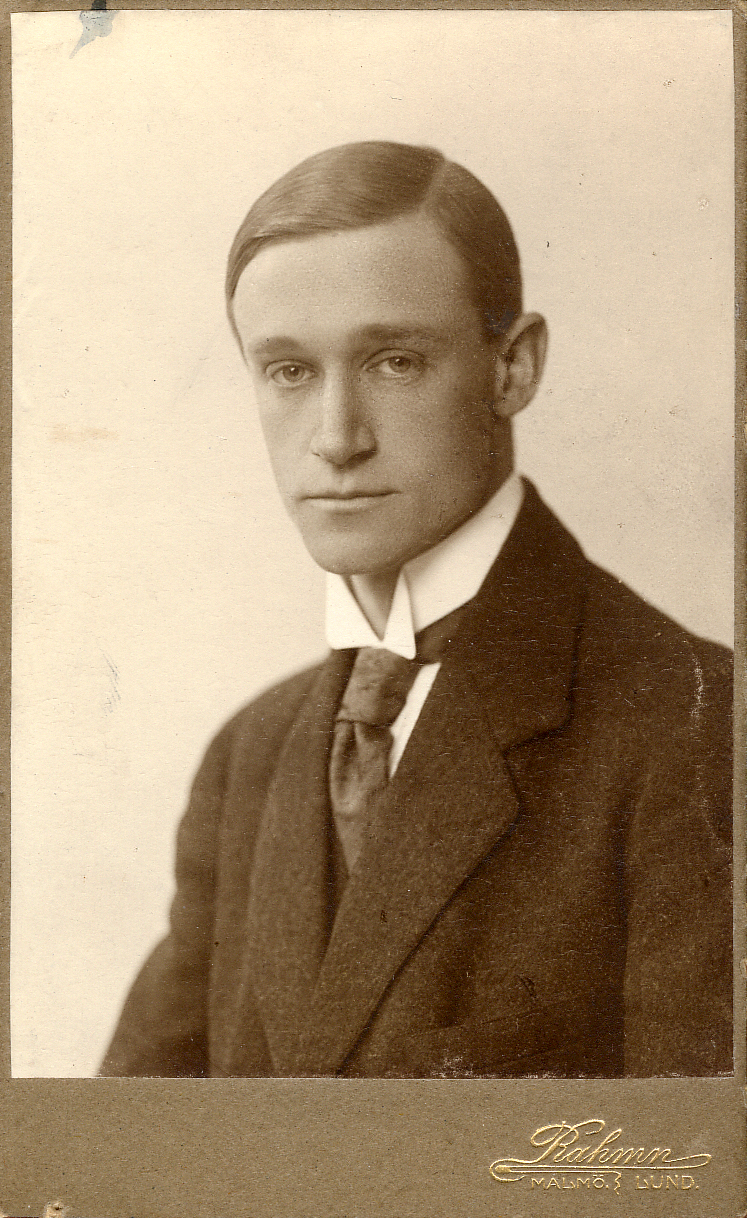
Curt Weibull

Curt Weibull (19 August 1886 – 10 November 1991) was a Swedish historian, educator and author.

== Biography ==
Curt Hugo Johannes Weibull was born in Lund, Sweden. He was a member of the Weibull family. He was the son of professor Martin Weibull (1835–1902) and brother of historian Lauritz Weibull (1873–1960). He and his brother both attended the University of Lund. The Weibull brothers have been characterized as influential in raising the scientific standards of history research in Sweden and Denmark.

Curt Weibull was a professor of history at the University of Gothenburg from 1927 to 1953 and its rector from 1936 to 1946. In 1928 he and his brother, Lauritz Weibull, initiated the periodical Scandia. Together they are known for having introduced a critical theory of history to Swedish historical research, inspired by German historian Leopold von Ranke (1795–1886). Weibull was an important mentor to noted Swedish historian Erik Lönnroth (1910–2002), who further developed the methods of evaluating sources.

His most important and acclaimed work is a criticism regarding the interpretation and the ahistoricism of the Gesta Danorum by the 12th century Danish historian Saxo Grammaticus. This piece was named: Saxo. Kritiska undersökningar i Danmarks historia från Sven Estridsens död till Canute VI (Saxo. Critical studies in Denmark's history from Sven Estriden's death to Canute VI), and was rather controversial at the time, as it revealed the vague basis of Denmark's older history of the time.

In 1991, when he was 105, his last work was published: an article in a book celebrating the 100th anniversary of the University of Gothenburg. That probably makes him the oldest historian in the world to have a new study published while still alive. An anecdote tells that when a Danish historian was counter-criticizing parts of Weibull's Ph.D. thesis (from 1916) on Saxo Grammaticus in his own thesis (believing Weibull to be dead since this was after his 100th birthday) Weibull appeared in the public disputation angrily defending his work. During the late 1970s, while lecturing about his life and his research to younger students, he had humorously remarked about a Danish professor who had criticized his own thesis when it appeared: "I haven't replied in depth to the criticism of the professor. But it's not too late, now is it?"

Weibull was married to Gunilla Lundström and was the father of the Swedish historian and Liberal politician, Jorgen Weibull (1924–1998). Weibull was buried in Norra kyrkogården in Lund.

== Selected works ==
- Sverige och dess nordiska Grannmakter under den tidigare medeltiden (1921)
- Lübeck och Skånemarknaden. Studier i Lübecks pundtullsböcker och pundtullskvitton 1368-1369 och 1398-1400 (1922)
- Drottning Christina (1931)
- Göteborgs Högskola: dess förhistoria och uppkomst (1941)
- Händelser och utvecklingslinjer. Historiska studier (1949)
- Göta älvs mynning. Land och städer fram i äldre medeltid (1950)
- Tionden i Skåne under senare delen av 1600-talet (1952)
- Die Auswanderung der Goten aus Schweden (1958)
- Källkritik och historia: Norden under äldre medeltid (1964)
- Die Geaten des Beowulfepos und Die dänischen Trelleburgen : zwei Diskussionsbeiträge (1974)
- Lauritz Weibull. Den källkritiska metodens genombrott i nordisk medeltidsforskning. In: Scandia, 38:1 (1972)

== See also ==
- Prehistoric Sweden
- Early Swedish history
- Semi-legendary kings of Sweden - a topic closely scrutinized by Curt Weibull

== Other Sources ==
This article is fully or partially based on material from Nordisk familjebok, 1904–1926 and from Nationalencyklopedin online edition.

== Related reading ==
- Nilsson, Sven A. (1991) Curt Weibull (Årsbok, Yearbook of the Science Society of Lund)
