= List of scientific journals =

The following is a partial list of scientific journals. There are thousands of scientific journals in publication, and many more have been published at various points in the past. The list given here is far from exhaustive, only containing some of the most influential, currently publishing journals in each field. As a rule of thumb, each field should be represented by fewer than ten positions, chosen by their impact factors and other ratings.

Note: there are many science magazines that are not scientific journals, including Scientific American, New Scientist, Australasian Science and others. They are not listed here.

For periodicals in the social sciences and humanities, see list of social science journals.

== General and multidisciplinary science ==
- National Science Review
- Nature
- Nature Communications
- Philosophical Transactions of the Royal Society A
- PLoS One
- Proceedings of the National Academy of Sciences
- Proceedings of the Royal Society A
- Science
- Science Advances
- Scientific Reports

== Basic and physical sciences ==
=== Astronomy and astrophysics ===
- Astronomical Journal
- Astronomy and Astrophysics
- Astrophysical Journal
- Monthly Notices of the Royal Astronomical Society
- Publications of the Astronomical Society of the Pacific

=== Chemistry ===
- Accounts of Chemical Research
- Angewandte Chemie
- Bulletin of the Chemical Society of Japan
- Canadian Journal of Chemistry
- Chemical Communications
- Chemical Reviews
- Chemistry: A European Journal
- Chemistry Letters
- Helvetica Chimica Acta
- Journal of the American Chemical Society

=== Earth and atmospheric sciences ===
- American Mineralogist
- Atmospheric Chemistry and Physics
- Bulletin of the American Meteorological Society
- Canadian Geotechnical Journal
- Canadian Journal of Earth Sciences
- Earth Interactions
- Geoheritage
- Geophysical Research Letters
- International Journal of Speleology
- Journal of Applied Meteorology and Climatology
- Journal of the Atmospheric Sciences
- Journal of Climate
- Journal of Geophysical Research
- Journal of Physical Oceanography
- Journal of the IEST
- Monthly Weather Review
- National Weather Digest
- Nature Climate Change
- Tellus A
- Weather and Forecasting
- Zeitschrift für Geologische Wissenschaften (Journal for the Geological Sciences)

=== Materials science ===
- ACS Nano
- Advanced Functional Materials
- Advanced Materials
- Annual Review of Condensed Matter Physics
- Journal of Materials Chemistry A (energy and sustainability)
- Journal of Materials Chemistry B (biology and medicine)
- Journal of Materials Chemistry C (optical, magnetic and electronic devices)
- Nano Letters
- Nature Materials
- Nature Nanotechnology
- Progress in Materials Science
- Progress in Polymer Science
- Materials Horizons

=== Mechanics ===
- Annual Review of Fluid Mechanics
- Archive for Rational Mechanics and Analysis

=== Physics ===
- Acta Crystallographica – parts A, B
- Advances in Physics
- American Journal of Physics
- Annalen der Physik
- Applied Physics Letters
- Canadian Journal of Physics
- Journal of Physics – parts A–D, G
- Journal of Radiation Protection and Research
- Nature Physics
- New Journal of Physics
- Physical Review – parts A–E and Physical Review Letters
- Reports on Progress in Physics
- Ukrainian Journal of Physics

== Life sciences ==
=== Biology in general ===
- BioEssays
- Biological Reviews
- Biophysical Journal
- Cell
- eLife
- International Journal of Biological Sciences
- Journal of Cell Biology
- Journal of Mathematical Biology
- Journal of Molecular Biology
- Journal of Theoretical Biology
- Journal of Virology
- Philosophical Transactions of the Royal Society B
- Proceedings of the Royal Society B: Biological Sciences
- PLOS Biology

=== Agriculture ===
- Agronomy for Sustainable Development
- Animal Production Science
- Journal of Animal Science
- Journal of Applied Horticulture
- Journal of Dairy Science
- Journal of Horticultural Sciences
- Journal of the Science of Food and Agriculture
- Journal of Soil and Water Conservation

=== Bioinformatics ===
See List of bioinformatics journals

=== Biophysics and biochemistry ===
- Biochemical Journal
- Biochemistry
- Biophysical Journal
- European Journal of Biochemistry
- FEBS Journal
- Journal of Biological Chemistry
- Journal of Clinical Lipidology
- Journal of Molecular Biology
- Proteins
- RNA
- Xenobiotica

=== Botany ===
- American Journal of Botany
- Annals of Botany
- Aquatic Botany
- International Journal of Plant Sciences
- New Phytologist

=== Chronobiology ===
- Chronobiology International

=== Development ===
- Development
- Developmental Biology
- Developmental Cell
- Cell Stem Cell

=== Ecology ===
- Advances in Ecological Research
- Annual Review of Ecology, Evolution, and Systematics
- Ecology
- Ecology Letters
- Journal of Ecology
- Journal of Soil and Water Conservation
- Trends in Ecology & Evolution

=== Forestry ===
- Bosque
- Canadian Journal of Forest Research
- Forest Ecology and Management

=== Genetics ===
- Genetica
- Genetics
- Genetics in Medicine
- Heredity
- Journal of Genetics
- Nature Genetics
- Theoretical and Applied Genetics

=== Husbandry ===
- Rangifer

=== Immunology ===
- Allergy
- Annual Review of Immunology
- Current Opinion in Immunology
- European Journal of Immunology
- Immunity
- Infection and Immunity
- Journal of Allergy and Clinical Immunology
- Journal of Immunology
- Nature Immunology
- Nature Reviews Immunology
- Trends in Immunology

=== Neuroscience ===
- Behavioral and Brain Functions
- Behavioral and Brain Sciences
- Developmental Science
- European Neuropsychopharmacology
- Genes, Brain and Behavior
- Journal of Neurochemistry
- Journal of Neurophysiology
- Journal of Neuroscience
- Nature Neuroscience
- Neuron
- Physiology & Behavior
- Trends in Neurosciences

=== Veterinary medicine ===
- Archivos de Medicina Veterinaria
- Avian Diseases
- BMC Veterinary Research
- Canadian Veterinary Journal
- In Practice
- Journal of Feline Medicine and Surgery
- Journal of Veterinary Science
- Veterinary and Comparative Oncology
- Veterinary Immunology and Immunopathology
- Veterinary Parasitology
- Veterinary Pathology
- Veterinary Record
- Veterinary Research

=== Zoology ===
- Journal of Zoology
- Zoology
- Zootaxa
- Animal Cognition

== Engineering ==
=== Environmental engineering ===
- Biodegradation (journal)
- Bioresource Technology
- Environmental Earth Sciences
- Environmental Monitoring and Assessment
- International Journal of Environmental Science and Technology
- Journal of Environmental Engineering
- Waste Management & Research
- International Journal of Environmental Research

=== Mechanical engineering ===
- Advances in Production Engineering & Management
- Annual Review of Biomedical Engineering
- Archive of Applied Mechanics
- Biomedical Microdevices
- Chemical Engineering Science
- Coastal Engineering Journal
- Electronics Letters
- Experiments in Fluids
- Green Chemistry
- Industrial & Engineering Chemistry Research
- International Journal of Multiphase Flow
- Journal of Environmental Engineering
- Journal of Fluid Mechanics
- Journal of Hydrologic Engineering
- Journal of the IEST
- Measurement Science and Technology
- NASA Tech Briefs
- Optical Engineering
- Physics of Fluids
- The Post Office Electrical Engineers' Journal
- Radioelectronics and Communications Systems
- Structural and Multidisciplinary Optimization

=== Computer science ===
- Artificial Intelligence
- Communications of the ACM
- Computer
- IEEE Transactions on Pattern Analysis and Machine Intelligence
- IEEE Transactions on Computers
- IEEE Transactions on Evolutionary Computation
- IEEE Transactions on Fuzzy Systems
- IEEE Transactions on Information Theory
- IEEE Transactions on Neural Networks and Learning Systems
- International Journal of Computer Vision
- Journal of Artificial Intelligence Research
- Journal of Cryptology
- Journal of Functional Programming
- Journal of Machine Learning Research
- Journal of the ACM
- SIAM Journal on Computing

=== Robotics and automation ===
- The International Journal of Robotics Research
- IEEE Transactions on Robotics
- Paladyn

== Mathematics ==
=== General mathematics ===
- Acta Mathematica
- Advances in Mathematics
- Annals of Mathematics
- Bulletin of the American Mathematical Society
- Communications on Pure and Applied Mathematics
- Crelle's Journal
- Duke Mathematical Journal
- Inventiones Mathematicae
- Israel Journal of Mathematics
- Journal de Mathématiques Pures et Appliquées
- Journal of the American Mathematical Society
- Journal of the European Mathematical Society
- Mathematische Annalen
- Publications Mathématiques de l'IHÉS

=== Statistics ===
- The American Statistician
- Biometrics
- Biometrika
- Journal of the American Statistical Association
- Journal of Business & Economic Statistics
- Journal of Industrial and Management Optimization
- Journal of the Royal Statistical Society
- Journal of Statistical Software
- Revista Colombiana de Estadistica
- Statistical Science
- Technometrics

== Medicine and health care ==
- Annals of Internal Medicine
- Archives of Internal Medicine
- British Medical Journal
- Cardiovascular Diabetology
- International Journal of Medical Sciences
- Journal of the American Medical Association
- Journal of Clinical Investigation
- Journal of Dietary Supplements
- Journal of Experimental Medicine
- The Lancet
- Molecular Medicine
- Nature Medicine
- New England Journal of Medicine
- PLOS Medicine
- PLOS Neglected Tropical Diseases
- The Scientific World Journal
- Science Translational Medicine
- Social Science and Medicine

=== Public health ===
- American Journal of Public Health
- Bulletin of the World Health Organization
- Health Affairs
- Health and Human Rights
- Mayo Clinic Proceedings
- Milbank Quarterly
- Public Health Nutrition

=== Nutrition and food science ===
- Advances in Nutrition
- American Journal of Clinical Nutrition
- Annual Review of Nutrition
- Appetite
- Applied Physiology, Nutrition, and Metabolism
- British Journal of Nutrition
- Childhood Obesity
- Critical Reviews in Food Science and Nutrition
- European Journal of Clinical Nutrition
- European Journal of Nutrition
- Food and Nutrition Bulletin
- Food & Nutrition Research
- Food Quality and Preference
- International Journal of Behavioral Nutrition and Physical Activity
- International Journal of Obesity
- International Journal of Sport Nutrition and Exercise Metabolism
- Journal of the Academy of Nutrition and Dietetics
- Journal of Agricultural and Food Chemistry
- Journal of Food Science
- The Journal of Food Science Education
- Journal of Human Nutrition and Dietetics
- Journal of Nutrition
- The Journal of Nutrition, Health and Aging
- Journal of Nutritional Biochemistry
- Journal of Parenteral and Enteral Nutrition
- Journal of Renal Nutrition
- Molecular Nutrition & Food Research
- Nutrition
- Nutrition and Cancer
- Nutrition in Clinical Practice
- Nutrition Journal
- Nutrition Reviews
- Nutritional Neuroscience
- Obesity
- Pediatric Obesity

== Other fields ==
=== Energy ===
- Annals of Nuclear Energy
- Biofuels, Bioproducts and Biorefining
- Energy Conversion and Management
- Energy and Environmental Science
- Energy
- International Journal of Hydrogen Energy
- Journal of Photonics for Energy
- Nuclear Science and Techniques
- Progress in Nuclear Energy
- Nuclear Technology

=== Forensic science ===
- Criminology
- Forensic Science International
- International Journal of Legal Medicine
- Journal of the Canadian Society of Forensic Science
- Science & Justice

=== Physical education ===
- African Journal for Physical Health Education, Recreation and Dance

== See also ==
- List of academic databases and search engines
- List of academic journals
- List of science magazines of popular and non peer-reviewed kind
- List of open access journals
- Lists of academic journals
