= The Aging Symposium (Alberta) =

Academic conference in Canada

- Time: Decennially: 1982 - 2002 Quinquennially: 2002 - Present
- Duration: 2-4 days
- Location: Edmonton Calgary Hinton
- Also known as: The Edmonton Aging Symposium
- Type: Research symposium
- Organized by: Alberta Centre on Aging; Alberta Council on Aging; Canadian Association of Gerontology; Grey Matters

The Aging Symposium in Alberta, Canada is an academic conference on aging that was first held in 1982. From 1982 until 2002, the symposium was held every ten years, and from 2002 to present, it has been held every five years. Because there are several distinct gerontology research groups in Alberta, symposium sponsorship has alternated between different organizations. Since the first symposium in 1982, conferences have alternately been sponsored by the Alberta Centre on Aging, the Alberta Association of Gerontology, the Alberta Council on Aging, the University of Alberta's Special Interest Group on Aging, and Grey Matters Alberta.

== History ==
The Aging Symposium in Alberta has been held in cities such as Edmonton, Calgary, and Hinton. The impact the Aging Symposium has been documented in a range of subsequent literature. In particular, research that was presented at the 2007 Edmonton Aging Symposium has been cited in books by authors such as Greg Critser and Greg Fahy, as well as in articles published in the Journal of Nutrition, Health and Aging.

=== 1982 ===
Alberta's first aging symposium was sponsored by the Canadian Association of Gerontology held in conjunction with the introduction of the University of Alberta's Centre for Gerontology, which was eventually renamed the Alberta Centre on Aging. In 1982, the University of Alberta introduced the Centre for Gerontology, which was sponsored by both the Faculty of Arts and the Faculty of Medicine; the centre was created "to enhance the understanding of the aged individual and of the aging process by mean of the support, encouragement, and facilitation of research in gerontology." The 1982 symposium was held May 31-June 3. The 1982 symposium took place at the Hotel Macdonald. The 1982 symposium was organized by Dr. Hayden Roberts.

=== 1992 ===
Ten years after the first symposium, a second conference was held October 22-25, 1992. Similar to the first conference, the second aging symposium was co-sponsored by the Canadian Association of Gerontology and the University of Alberta's Centre for Gerontology.

=== 2002 ===
In October 2002, a third Alberta aging symposium was sponsored by the Alberta Council on Aging and held in Calgary. This symposium was funded by several different groups including the University of Calgary and Athabasca University, as well as the Seniors Advisory Council for Alberta and the Canadian Institute on Health and Aging.

=== 2007 ===
By 2007 the University of Alberta's Centre for Gerontology had formally changed its name to the Alberta Centre on Aging and was one of the sponsors for the Edmonton Aging Symposium. The Edmonton Aging Symposium was the entirely inspired, organized, and funded through the efforts of Dr. Kevin Perrott and held March 30-31, 2007. The 2007 symposium was inspired by Kevin Perrott's work with the Methuselah Foundation and the science of developing interventions in aging process as a means to prevent chronic degenerative disease. The Symposium featured future forward speakers such as Aubrey de Grey, Gregory Stock, Ronald Bailey, Daniel Callahan, Luiji Fontana, Judith Campisi, William J. Evans, Ellen Heber-Katz, and Amit Patel, amongst others. The 2007 symposium took place at Bernard Snell Hall at the University of Alberta. The 2007 symposium was a standalone and entirely novel gathering of government, academic, industry, and the general public to discuss the necessity and impact of the development of interventions in aging. Dr. Kevin Perrott has gone on to create multiple organizations focused on this goal.

=== 2012 ===
Similar to the symposium presented five years prior in 2007, Alberta's fifth aging symposium was held on campus at the University of Alberta. Instead of being presented by the Alberta Centre on Aging, however, the fifth symposium was sponsored by the university's Special Interest Group on Aging in the Faculty of Rehabilitation Medicine. The fifth aging symposium was held in June 2012.

=== 2017 ===
From September 11-13, 2017 a sixth aging symposium was held in Hinton, Alberta and sponsored by Grey Matters Alberta.

== See also ==
- Alberta Centre on Aging
- List of Canadian provinces and territories by life expectancy
