= Nieuwe Haagse Kookboek =

The New Hague Cookbook, or the Hague Cookbook, is one of the classical cookbooks of the Dutch cuisine. Since the book was first published in 1934, it has seen more than 80 reprints.

== History ==
The cookbook was originally compiled for use in the cookery classes of the Domestic Science College at the Laan van Meerdervoort in The Hague. Its recipes were based on the demands of the Dutch kitchen of the nineteen thirties: food should be nourishing, but it should not be a burden on the household budget. The authors of the Cookery Book, Miss Fréderique Mathilde Stoll and Miss Wilhelmina Hendrika De Groot were both teachers at the well-known Laan van Meerdervoort Domestic Science College. In their view a meal should not only be nourishing, but it should give pleasure too. These new views on food soon led to the introduction of the New Hague Cookery Book in many other Dutch Domestic Science Colleges and eventually into the Dutch kitchen.

As it is continually adapted to the latest findings of nutritional science and to the changing tastes of the times, the book remained in high demand for generations. The recipes of the Hague Cookbook are marked by their moderate use of seasoning.

== See also ==
- Wannée Kookboek
