= Alberta Centre on Aging =

Interdisciplinary research center

Coordinates: 53°31′28″N 113°31′28″W

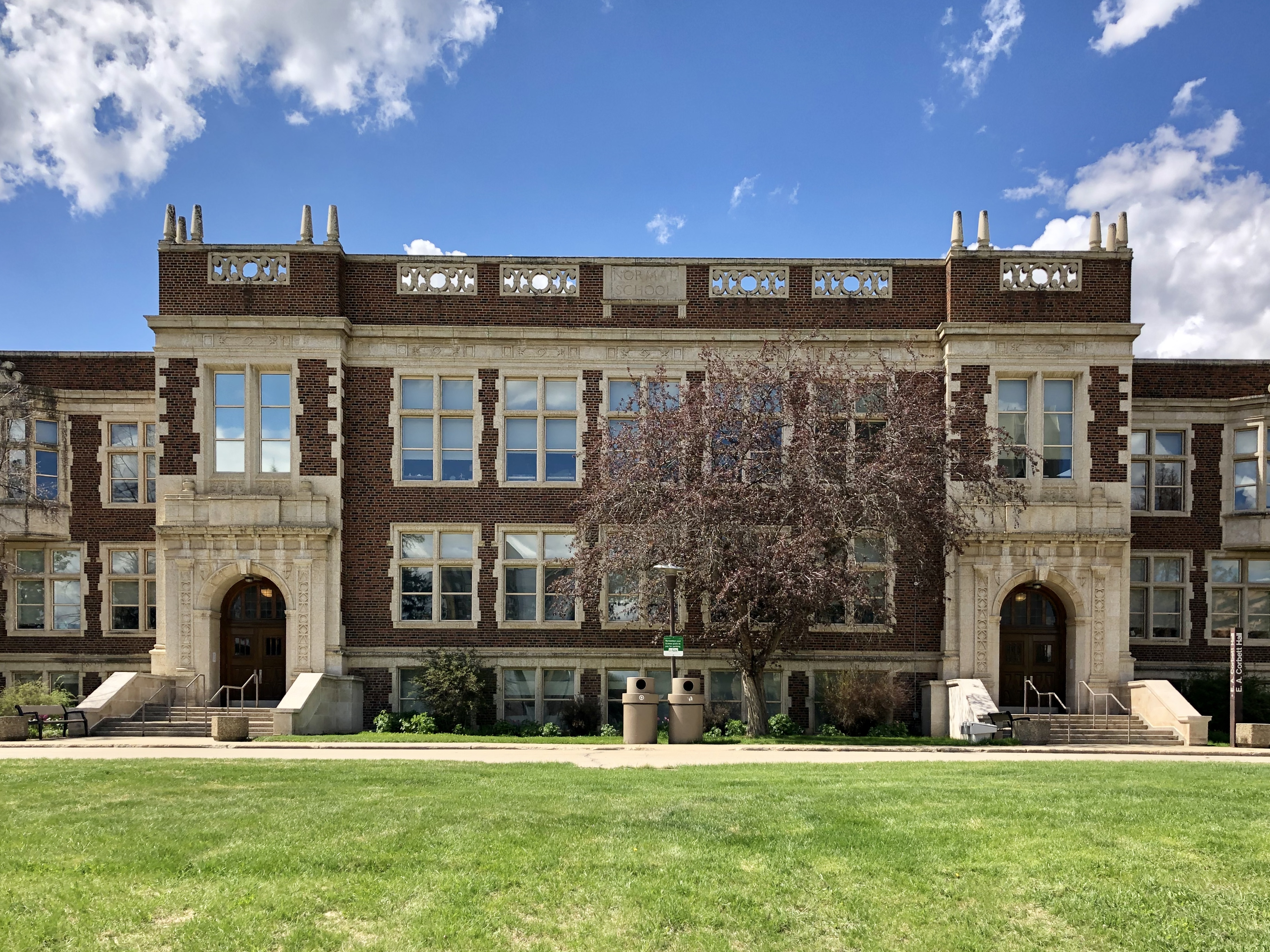
- The Alberta Centre on Aging is located on the third floor of Corbett Hall
- Founded at: University of Alberta
- Type: Research centre
- Headquarters: Corbett Hall; 8205 114 St NW; Edmonton, AB T6G 2G4
- Website: Official website

The Alberta Centre on Aging is an interdisciplinary research center at the University of Alberta in Edmonton, Canada.

== History ==
As a scholarly research center, the Alberta Center on Aging has historically worked to advance front-line research in aging through coordinated interdisciplinary efforts and through organizations with partners.

In 1982, the University of Alberta introduced the Centre for Gerontology, which was sponsored by both the Faculty of Arts and the Faculty of Medicine; the centre was created "to enhance the understanding of the aged individual and of the aging process by mean of the support, encouragement, and facilitation of research in gerontology."

The Alberta Centre on Aging began issuing publications in the early 1990s. In 2007, the organization published Aging In Rural Canada, which was an annotated bibliography printed by the University of Alberta Press. In March 2010, the Edmonton Journal announced that the Alberta Centre on Aging was receiving funding cuts from the University of Alberta.

== Research ==
In 2004, the Alberta Centre on Aging sponsored research from gerontologist Bonnie Dobbs which discussed the impact that aging can have on driving. The Edmonton Journal explained that at the Edmonton Aging Symposium, "Dobbs stressed that it's not older drivers per se who are at risk, but those with impaired judgment."

In 2010, the Alberta Centre on Aging supported Dr. Cary Brown in the creation of an online workshop and toolkit for families dealing with Alzheimer's and dementia.

== Publications ==
The Alberta Centre on Aging has sponsored the publication of several books and research articles.

=== Books ===
- Dawn Of A New Age: Facing The Future Together (1992)
- The Importance Of Community Care and Support For An Aging Population (1999)
- Aging In Rural Canada: An Annotated Bibliography (2007)

=== Articles ===
- Quality of Life of Adults with Unhealed and Healed Diabetic Foot Ulcers (2006)
- Depressive symptoms among older adults in urban and rural areas (2006)
- Estimating the Incidence of Dementia (2006)
- Patient and informal caregivers’ knowledge of heart failure (2009)
- Video Programming for Individuals With Dementia (2009)
- Social Determinants of Health for Older Women in Canada (2010)
- Associative interference in older and younger adults (2019)

== See also ==
- List of Canadian provinces and territories by life expectancy
