= Health benefit =

Health benefit or health benefits may refer to:

- Health benefits (insurance), a payment received through a health insurance
- Health benefit (medicine), the phenomenon that a food, substance or activity is improving health
- Health claim, a usually unproven claim as to medical health benefits of food, etc.
