= Malaysian Journal of Nutrition =

- Discipline: Nutrition science
- Language: English
- Edited by: Khor Geok Lin

Publication details
- History: 1995-present
- Publisher: Nutrition Society of Malaysia
- Frequency: Triannual

Standard abbreviations
- ISO 4: Malays. J. Nutr.

Indexing
- ISSN: 1394-035X
- OCLC no.: 871204578

Links
- Journal homepage

The Malaysian Journal of Nutrition is a triannual peer-reviewed medical journal published by the Nutrition Society of Malaysia. It was established in 1995 and covers nutrition science. The editor-in-chief is Khor Geok Lin.

== Abstracting and indexing ==
The journal is abstracted and indexed in Index Medicus/PubMed/MEDLINE and Scopus.
