= Wannée Kookboek =

1910 Dutch cookbook

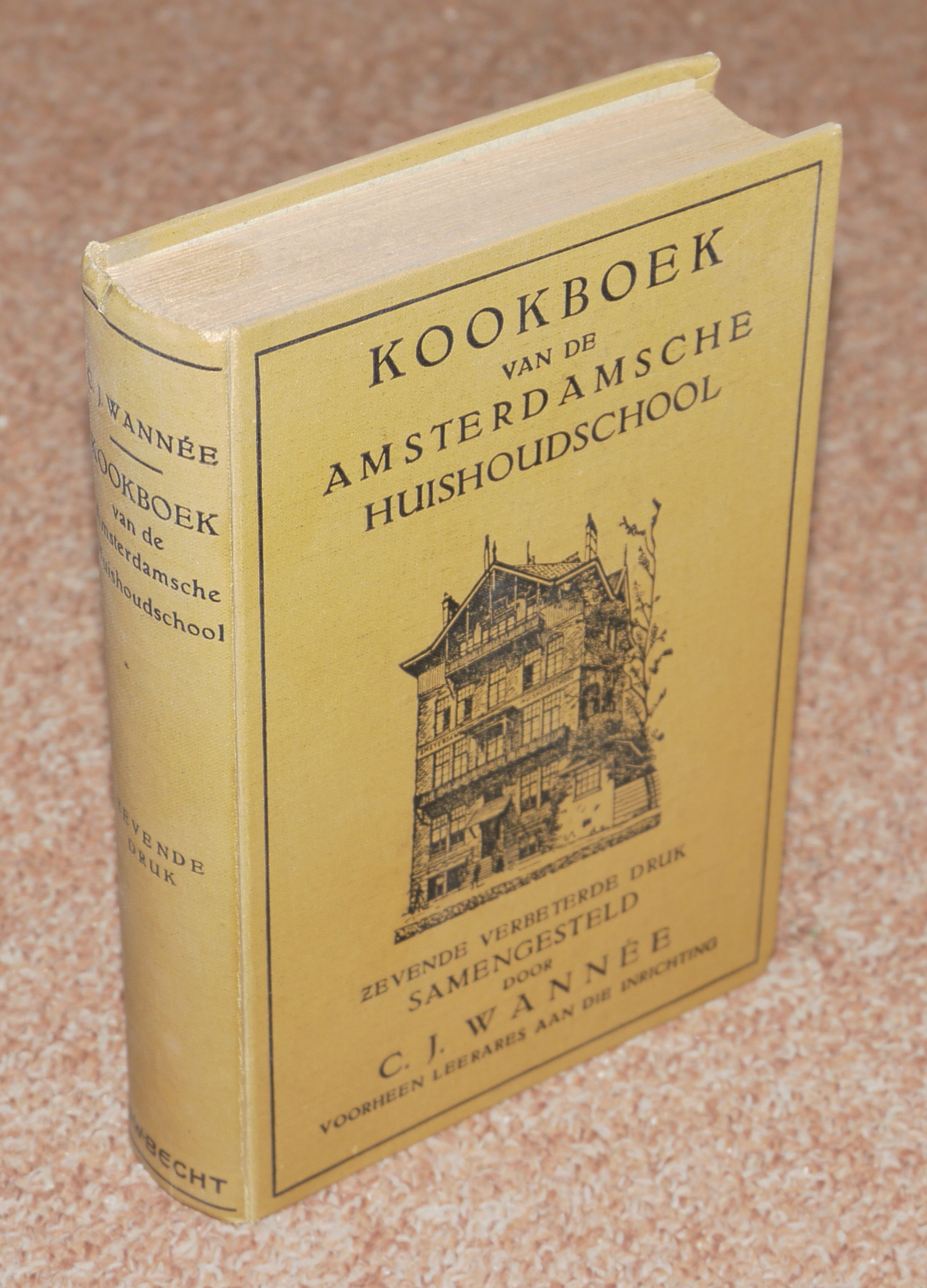
Cookbook of the Amsterdamsche huishoudschool, written by Mrs. C.J. Wannée, publisher Becht, Amsterdam (7th edition)

The Wannée Cookbook, the Cookbook of the Amsterdam Domestic Science Academy, or briefly, the Amsterdam Cookbook, is one of the classical cookbooks of the Dutch cuisine. Since its first edition (1910), it was reprinted over 29 times.

== History ==
The cookbook was originally written as a text book on cooking for the Amsterdam Domestic Science Academy. Here, girls were trained (boys were not allowed) as housekeepers or maids, or prepared for their traditional role as a housewife. In those days social class divisions were still prevalent in education. Pupils from different social backgrounds were taught separately, even in the same school. Awareness of social differences, encouraged Cornelia Johanna Wannée (1880–1932) to compile a cookbook comprising simple recipes for the less well off, recipes for the middle class purse and recipes for the refined kitchen of the upper classes.

Ten years later, some forty thousand copies of the cookbook had been sold. As it is continually adapted to the latest findings of nutritional science and to the changing tastes of the times, the book remained in high demand for generations. Due to Amsterdam's colonial trading history (Dutch East India Company), the Amsterdam Cookbook favours well-seasoned dishes.

== See also ==
- Nieuwe Haagse Kookboek
