= George L. Blackburn =

American nutritionist

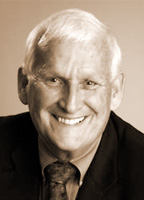

George L. Blackburn (February 12, 1936 – February 20, 2017) was the S. Daniel Abraham Professor of Nutrition and associate director of the division of nutrition at Harvard Medical School. He was also director of the Center for the Study of Nutrition Medicine (CSNM) in the Roberta and Stephen R. Weiner Department of Surgery, and director of the new Feihe Nutrition Laboratory at Beth Israel Deaconess Medical Center (BIDMC), Boston, Massachusetts.

== Early life and education ==
He was born on February 12, 1936, in McPherson, Kansas, and was raised in Joplin, Missouri. He graduated from the University of Kansas with a BA degree in chemistry in 1958. He then served as a lieutenant in the U.S. Navy service as a Lieutenant. He went on to complete his medical degree from the University of Kansas in 1965. Subsequently he completed his internship and residency at Boston City Hospital, Harvard Medical School. In 1973, he was awarded a PhD in nutritional biochemistry from the Massachusetts Institute of Technology.

== Career ==
Blackburn's research included the role of fatty acids and proteins on energy biochemistry, the nutrient effects of bioactive components on cellular and molecular function, the metabolic correlates of weight loss following surgical treatment of obesity, and the neurocognitive bases of exercise and eating behavior. Multidisciplinary collaborations and the dissemination of best practices in surgical, nonsurgical, and neurocognitive interventions for the treatment of obesity and obesity-related diseases are ongoing priorities. The launch of the Feihe Nutrition Laboratory enabled Blackburn to revisit research on foods for special dietary purposes, including the reengineering of formula diets using the new sciences of gut microbiota and probiotics. Blackburn investigated the most complex issues dealing with healthy living, nutrition, cancer prevention, and the role of neurocognition in eating behavior and exercise. He trained over 100 fellows in applied and clinical nutrition, and published 486 articles in peer-reviewed journals.

He was one of the original principal investigators of the National Institute of Diabetes and Digestive and Kidney Diseases' Look AHEAD trial. It examined the effects of a lifestyle intervention designed to achieve and maintain long-term weight loss through decreased caloric intake and exercise. He served as the director of an expert panel on weight loss surgery, and on the board of the NIH-funded Boston Obesity Nutrition Research Center. He was the recipient of numerous grants from the NIH and other government agencies.

Blackburn was on the editorial boards of numerous peer-reviewed journals, including the Journal of the American Medical Association (JAMA) New England Journal of Medicine, Annals of Internal Medicine, American Journal of Clinical Nutrition, Journal of Parenteral and Enteral Nutrition, American Journal of Public Health, Journal of the National Cancer Institute, and the International Journal of Obesity. He also serves as a reviewer for JAMA, the New England Journal of Medicine, Diabetes Care, and many other highly esteemed publications.

Blackburn was awarded the 1988 Grace Goldsmith Award by the American College of Nutrition. In 1992, Blackburn was named an honorary member of the American Dietetic Association. In 1998, he received the Joseph Goldberger Award in Clinical Nutrition from the American Medical Association. In 2004, he was named a Fellow of the American Society for Nutrition in recognition of his distinguished career in nutrition.

He was a director of EChO - Eradicate Childhood Obesity Foundation, Inc. beginning in 2015.

== Published work ==
In 2008, he published the weight loss book, "Break Through Your Set Point. How to Finally Lose the Weight you Want and Keep it Off."

He was a prolific author, contributing to hundreds of scientific journal articles and several books. A selection of his papers include:

- Improving the Weight of the Nation by engaging the medical setting in obesity prevention and control. J Law Med Ethics. 2013 Winter;41 Suppl 2:19-26.
- Impact of intensive lifestyle intervention on depression and health-related quality of life in type 2 diabetes: the Look AHEAD Trial. Diabetes Care. 2014 Jun;37(6):1544-53
- Randomized trial of a telephone-based weight loss intervention in postmenopausal women with breast cancer receiving letrozole: the LISA trial. J Clin Oncol. 2014 Jul 20;32(21):2231-9.
- Impact of intensive lifestyle intervention on depression and health-related quality of life in type 2 diabetes: the Look AHEAD Trial. Diabetes Care. 2014 Jun;37(6):1544-53
- Computational modeling of transcranial direct current stimulation (tDCS) in obesity: Impact of head fat and dose guidelines. Neuroimage Clin. 2013 May 31;2:759-66.
- The effects of separate and combined dietary weight loss and exercise on fasting ghrelin concentrations in overweight and obese women: a randomized controlled trial. Clin Endocrinol. 2014 May 5. doi: 10.1111/cen.12483. [Epub ahead of print]

== Death ==
He died from melanoma on 20 February 2017 at the age of 81.
