= International Solid Waste Association =

International Solid Waste Association (ISWA)
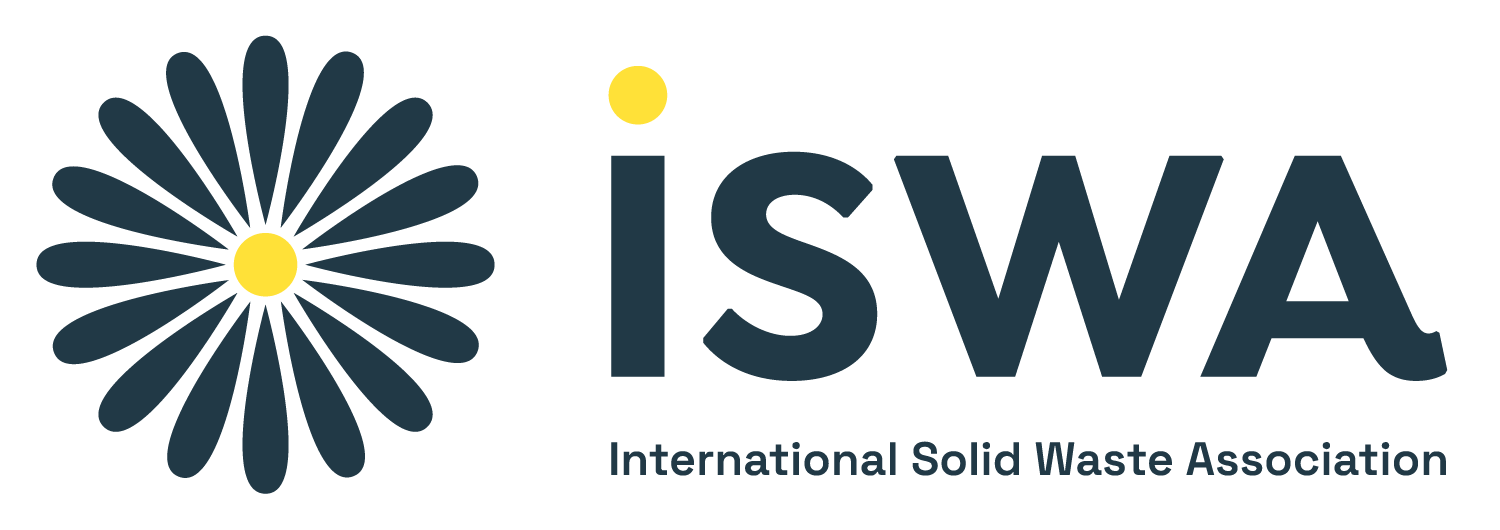
- Logo of the International Solid Waste Association.
- Type: Professional association
- Purpose: Sustainable waste management
- Location: Rotterdam, Netherlands
- Region served: Worldwide
- Method: Conferences, publications, working groups, task forces, workshops
- Key people: Carlos Silva Filho (president)
- Website: www.iswa.org

The International Solid Waste Association (ISWA) is a non-governmental, independent and non-profit association by statutes and follows the mission statement to promote and develop professional waste management worldwide as a contribution to sustainable development.

ISWA's objective is the worldwide exchange of information and experience on all aspects of waste management. The association promotes the adoption of acceptable systems of professional waste management and of public cleansing through technological development and improvement of practices for the protection of human life, health and the environment as well as the conservation of materials and energy resources.

ISWA is active in a variety of areas, including conferences, meetings, training programs, information development and dissemination, and technical assistance on a global scale. The association has a total of more than 1,200 members in 93 countries. Its network expands to countries with more than 80% of the world's population and represents all aspects of the waste management field: from practitioners and industry to communities, from associations, research institutes and academics to regulatory authorities.

== Working groups ==
The association is the global forum for waste management with nine technical working groups covering all relevant aspects of sustainable waste management and with special interest in developing country issues.

- Working Group on Biological Treatment of Wastes: addresses the biological treatment of the organic fraction of solid waste through aerobic and anaerobic decomposition processes.
- Working Group on Collection and Transfer Technology: addresses the storage, collection, transfer and transportation of solid wastes.
- Working Group on Communication: addresses public concerns, comprising public support of and opposition to waste management policies, public consultation and participation, and communication and social issues with focus on human attitudes towards waste.
- Working Group on Hazardous Waste: focuses on the sound management of hazardous wastes from both industrial and household sources, and the remediation of hazardous waste sites resulting from unacceptable hazardous wastes management practices.
- Working Group on Healthcare Waste: promotes the integrated provision of the infrastructure for the safe management of health care waste worldwide, within the framework of the objectives, activities and means of implementation established by Agenda 21 of the United Nations Conference on the Environment and Development.
- Working Group on Legal Issues: works towards exchanging knowledge and experience on legal subjects within the entire field of solid waste management. Including waste minimisation, low waste technology, reuse, recycling, collection, transportation, treatment and disposal of all types of waste, operation of waste management systems, eco-management and audit scheme, environmental protection, work in environment and public participation.
- Working Group on Recycling and Waste minimisation: addresses both minimisation of solid waste generation and the separation, processing and marketing of materials removed from the municipal solid waste stream.
- Working Group on Thermal Treatment: addresses the thermal treatment of municipal solid waste, comprising the combustion processes, the production of energy, the control of emissions and the handling of residues.
- Working Group on Landfill: focuses on the design, construction, regulation, and management of landfills, for both industrial and developing nations. Management interests include operations, closure, and post-closure issues, including ground water monitoring and testing, leachate management, gas management, as well as the quantity and quality of the wastes landfilled.

== Development networks and programmes ==
- Regional development networks:

ISWA has established regional development networks outside its core regions, including Central Europe and the United States. Three regional networks have been established:

• Asian and Pacific Regional Network: includes members from Australia, New Zealand, Singapore and Thailand.

• Balcanien, Middle East and Mediterranean Regional Network: includes members from Turkey and Israel.

• Latin America Regional Network: includes members from Argentina and Brazil.

The objective of these networks is to promote sustainable waste management in their regions, to develop a network for local problem solving, to promote ISWA and serve as a link to ISWA programs. Each regional office organizes local meetings, conferences and training events to address issues of concern for a specific region.

- ISWA development programme

The ISWA development programme was created to fund educational and training programmes in the field of waste management as well as sustain a transfer of knowledge to developing countries and economies in transition. The IDP is a World Summit on Sustainable Development Type II Partnership endorsed by the United Nations Environment Programme and is financed by voluntary donations from ISWA members, as well as third-party sponsors.

== Publications ==
ISWA publications include journals (Waste Management & Research), newsmagazine (Waste Management World), several position and policy papers, key issue papers and various reports from working groups.

== Education and training ==
ISWA organizes training courses and workshops worldwide through its working groups and in cooperation with other organizations. It has also launched the International Solid Waste Manager Certification Programme, which provides certification for waste management professionals based on academic qualifications and practical experience.

== See also ==
- Chartered Institute of Wastes Management (CIWM) UK
