= Health claim =

Claim by a manufacturer of food products

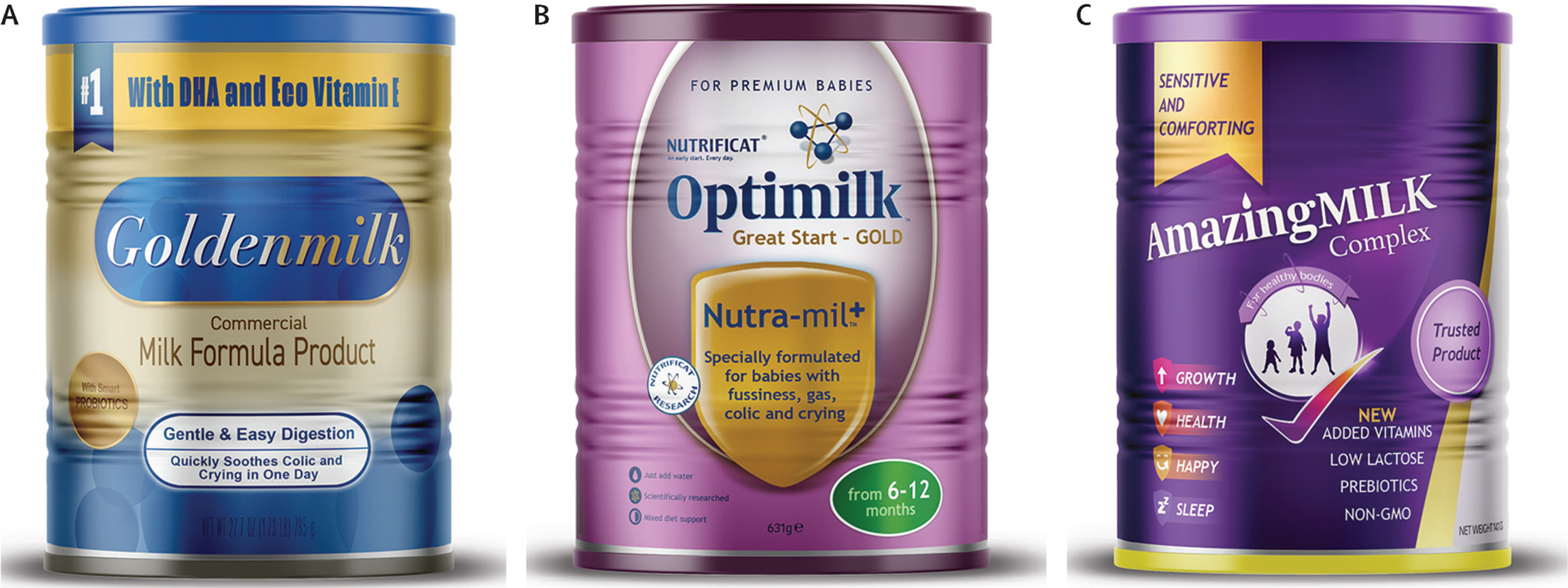
Example of a health claim. In the image, the packaging labeled "C" (first on the right) contains claims related to growth, health, happiness, and improved sleep.

A health claim on a food label or in food marketing is a statement that states, suggests, or implies a relationship between a food, food component, or dietary supplement and health. For example, manufacturers of oat cereals may claim that oat bran can help reduce cholesterol, which is associated with a lower risk of heart disease.

Some label statements may imply health benefits without making a specific disease-risk or function claim. Other terms, such as nutrient-content, production-method, or composition claims, may be regulated separately from health claims.

Health claims are also made for over-the-counter drugs and prescription drugs, medical procedures, and medical devices, but these generally have a separate, much more stringent set of regulations.

== Types of claims ==
Health claims are commonly distinguished from other label claims, although terminology and legal treatment vary by jurisdiction. In the United States, the Food and Drug Administration distinguishes between health claims, qualified health claims, nutrient content claims, and structure/function claims. Health claims describe a relationship between a food, food component, or dietary supplement and a reduced risk of a disease or health-related condition. Qualified health claims are supported by scientific evidence but do not meet the standard required for an authorized health claim, and must therefore include qualifying language.

Structure/function claims describe the role of a nutrient or dietary ingredient in affecting the normal structure or function of the human body, such as claims related to bone strength, digestion, or general well-being. These claims do not state that a product can diagnose, treat, cure, or prevent a disease. Nutrient content claims describe the level of a nutrient or dietary substance in a product, such as claims that a food is "low fat", "high in fibre", or contains "no added sugar".

Other regulatory systems use different classifications. In the European Union, nutrition claims and health claims are regulated separately, with health claims including general function claims, disease-risk-reduction claims, and claims referring to children's development and health. In Canada, health claims include function claims, disease-risk-reduction claims, and therapeutic claims.

== Health claims in the United States ==
In the United States, health claims on nutrition facts labels are regulated by the U.S. Food and Drug Administration (FDA), while advertising is regulated by the Federal Trade Commission. Dietary supplements are regulated as a separate type of consumer item from food or over-the-counter drugs.

=== Food ===
==== FDA guidelines ====
According to the FDA, "Authorized health claims in food labeling are claims that have been reviewed by FDA and are allowed on food products or dietary supplements to show that a food or food component may reduce the risk of a disease or a health-related condition." An authorized health claim is limited to evidence for reducing the risk of a disease, and does not apply to the diagnosis, cure, mitigation, or treatment of disease. It must be reviewed, evaluated, and publicly-announced by the FDA prior to use.

Approval of a health claim by the FDA requires significant scientific agreement (SSA) among reputable scientists that the claim is based on publicly-available evidence that a relationship exists between an element and a disease. The SSA standard provides a high degree of confidence that the relationship between the element and the disease is valid.

Based on scientific evidence, such claims may be used for marketing on foods or dietary supplements. The authorized health claim must be written in a way that helps consumers understand the importance of including the element in their daily diet.

The FDA has guidelines for what is considered a misleading label, and also monitors and warns food manufacturers against labeling foods as having specific health effects when no evidence exists to support such statements, such as for one manufacturer in 2018.

A qualified health claim is supported by some scientific evidence, but does not meet the significant scientific standard of evidence required for an authorized health claim. Qualified health claims must be accompanied by a disclaimer or other qualifying language to accurately communicate the level of scientific evidence supporting the claim.

==== Consumer advocacy ====
The use of the label “Healthy” on a variety of foods has been a particular issue for many food quality advocacy groups. In general, claims of health benefits for specific foodstuffs are not supported by scientific evidence and are not evaluated by national regulatory agencies. Additionally, research funded by manufacturers or marketers has been criticized to result in more favorable results than those from independently funded research.

=== Dietary supplements ===
In the United States, these claims, usually referred to as "qualified health claims", are regulated by the Food and Drug Administration (FDA) in the public interest.

The rule in place before 2003 required "significant scientific consensus" before a claim could be made, applying characterization of a hierarchy of degrees of certainty:

- A: "There is significant scientific agreement for [the claim]."
- B: "Although there is some scientific evidence supporting [the claim], the evidence is not conclusive."
- C: "Some scientific evidence suggests [the claim]. However, the FDA has determined that this evidence is limited and not conclusive."
- D: "Very limited and preliminary scientific research suggests [the claim]. The FDA concludes that there is little scientific evidence supporting this claim."

See the Wikipedia article on dietary supplements for a description of current FDA policy.

== Health claims in Europe ==
In the European Union, the European Food Safety Authority provides regulations on food labeling to address the quality of possible health foods.

In the United Kingdom by law any health claim on food labels must be true and not misleading. Food producers may optionally use the (discontinued in 2010) Joint Health Claims Initiative to determine whether their claims are likely to be legally sustainable.

In early 2005 the European PASSCLAIM project (Process for the Assessment of Scientific Support for Claims on Foods), sponsored by the European Union and coordinated by ILSI-Europe (https://web.archive.org/web/20090822045739/http://europe.ilsi.org/), ended. The aim of this project was to develop criteria for the scientific substantiation of claims on foods. Several hundreds of scientists from academia, research institutes, government and industry have contributed to the project. All the resulting papers can be downloaded for free from http://www.ilsi.org/Europe/Pages/PASSCLAIM_Pubs.aspx. The final consensus paper, comprising the final set of criteria, has been published in June 2005 in the European Journal of Nutrition.
