= American Society for Parenteral and Enteral Nutrition =

US medical professional organization

- Abbreviation: ASPEN
- Founded: June 5, 1975; 51 years ago
- Tax ID no.: 52-1161382
- Legal status: 501(c)(3) nonprofit organization
- Purpose: To improve patient care by advancing the science and practice of clinical nutrition and metabolism.
- Headquarters: Silver Spring, Maryland, U.S.
- Coordinates: 38.994894°N 77.031753°W
- President: Sharon Y. Irving PhD, RN, CRNP
- Chief Executive Officer: Wanda Johnson, CMP, CAE, FACEhp
- Subsidiaries: Sustain LLC, Aspen Rhoads Research Foundation, _{501(c)(3)}, National Board of Nutrition Support Certification _{501(c)(6)}
- Expenses: $4,722,210 (2017)
- Employees: 21 (2016)
- Volunteers: 400 (2016)
- Website: www.nutritioncare.org

The American Society for Parenteral and Enteral Nutrition (ASPEN) is a US-based professional organization. Its members include dieticians, nurses, pharmacists, physicians and scientists who are involved in providing clinical nutrition to patients.

ASPEN was founded on June 5, 1975. It was officially incorporated on November 30, 1976. It has almost 6,000 members. The society runs an annual meeting, the ASPEN Nutrition Science & Practice Conference.

== Journals ==
- Journal of Parenteral and Enteral Nutrition
- Nutrition in Clinical Practice

== Publications ==
- The ASPEN Adult Nutrition Support Core Curriculum, 3rd Edition
- ASPEN Fluids, Electrolytes, and Acid-Base Disorders Handbook, Second Edition
- ASPEN Enteral Nutrition Handbook, 2nd Edition
- ASPEN Parenteral Nutrition Handbook, Third Edition
- Guidebook on Enteral Medication Administration

== See also ==
- Enteral administration
- Feeding tube
- National Board of Physician Nutrition Specialists
- Parenteral nutrition
