= Ecotrophology =

Ecotrophology is a branch of nutritional science and food science concerned with everyday practice. It is mainly in Germany that it is seen as a separate branch of the food industry, and the word is rare outside Germany.

Ecotrophologists are specialists in nutrition, food technology, consumer studies and economics. This includes physiological, economic and technological principles of healthy nutrition and practical application. They work in many different fields: management of the above types of operations, development of new nutritional concepts, marketing, quality management in food manufacturing and processing operations and research within the food industry. Due to the interdisciplinary nature of the training, ecotrophologists often take a coordinating role in quality management and marketing in the food industry.
