= Veterinary and Comparative Oncology (journal) =

- Discipline: Veterinary medicine, veterinary oncology
- Language: English
- Edited by: Stefano Comazzi and Douglas H. Thamm

Publication details
- History: 2003–present
- Publisher: Wiley-Blackwell
- Frequency: Quarterly
- Impact factor: 2.613 (2020)

Standard abbreviations
- ISO 4: Vet. Comp. Oncol.

Indexing
- CODEN: VCOEAN
- ISSN: 1476-5810 (print); 1476-5829 (web)
- LCCN: 2003213599
- OCLC no.: 52385211

Links
- Journal homepage

Veterinary and Comparative Oncology is a quarterly peer-reviewed scientific journal covering new scientific developments in veterinary oncology and comparative oncology. It was established in 2003 and is published by John Wiley & Sons on behalf of the Veterinary Cancer Society.

According to the Journal Citation Reports, its 2020 impact factor is 2.613, ranking it 29 out of 146 journals in the category 'Veterinary Sciences'.
