= Hans Konrad Biesalski =

German physician

- Known for: Hidden hunger
- Scientific career
- Fields: Nutritional medicine
- Workplaces: University of Hohenheim

Hans Konrad Biesalski (* 14 April 1949 in Marburg) is a German physician and professor of biological chemistry and nutritional medicine at the University of Hohenheim.

== Life ==
Biesalski enrolled first in physics at Johannes Gutenberg University of Mainz before he switched to medicine at Bonn and Mainz where he graduated in 1979. He received his PhD in 1981 for a work about progressive loss of hearing during childhood at Mainz. While working at the Department of Physiology in Mainz, he received his habilitation for a work about vitamin A and the inner ear. In 1993, Biesalski was appointed full professor at the Institute of Biological Chemistry and Nutrition Science at University of Hohenheim. In 2007 Biesalski was chosen as fellow of the Berlin Institute for Advanced Study.

== Scientific contributions ==
Biesalski worked on the importance of vitamin A for the development and function of the inner ear and for lung function (maturing and mucous barrier). Especially the first-time description of the storage possibility of vitamin A (retinyl ester) in organs and tissues outside the liver were new findings for the research of the vitamin A metabolism. In 1995 he succeeded in demonstrating, that an alternative metabolism pathway over circulating retinyl ester exists. It was seen as a new alternative to the classical distribution method of vitamin A from the liver as retinol bound to a retinol binding protein (RBP). A pair of siblings was carrying a mutation of the gene for RBP and therefore showed an unmeasurable retinol blood level. Apart from minor changes of their skin and night blindness the siblings showed no significant anomaly typical for vitamin A deficiency.

Later Biesalski focused on questions of capture and treatment of hidden hunger (micronutrient deficiency) and food security. He also dealt with the therapy of micronutrient deficiency, mainly vitamin C at intensive care patients. A further experimental field is nutritargeting, which was described by him first. Nutritarging is the development of galenical formulations, allowing a targeted supply of organs with nutrients.
