= Food and Nutrition Bulletin =

- Discipline: Public health and nutrition
- Language: English
- Edited by: Dr. Noel Solomons

Publication details
- History: 1978-present
- Publisher: SAGE Publications
- Frequency: Quarterly
- Impact factor: 1.881 (2017)

Standard abbreviations
- ISO 4: Food Nutr. Bull.

Indexing
- CODEN: FNBPDV
- ISSN: 0379-5721 (print); 1552-6127 (web)
- LCCN: TX341
- OCLC no.: 5348644

Links
- Journal homepage

The Food and Nutrition Bulletin is a quarterly peer-reviewed scientific journal that was founded by Dr. Nevin S. Scrimshaw in 1978 and is published by SAGE Publications. The journal publishes articles that cover policy analysis, original scientific and social research, and academic reviews related to human nutrition and malnutrition in developing countries. It is an official publication of the Nevin Scrimshaw International Nutrition Foundation and is housed at the Friedman School of Nutrition Science and Policy at Tufts University.

== Abstracting and indexing ==
The journal is abstracted and indexed by MEDLINE and Scopus. According to the Journal Citation Reports, the journal's 2017 impact factor is 1.881, ranking it 63rd out of 133 journals in the category "Food Science and Technology", and 62nd out of 81 in the category "Nutrition and Dietetics".
