= Luigi Fontana (medical researcher) =

Italian/Australian physician scientist, professor, environmentalist and author

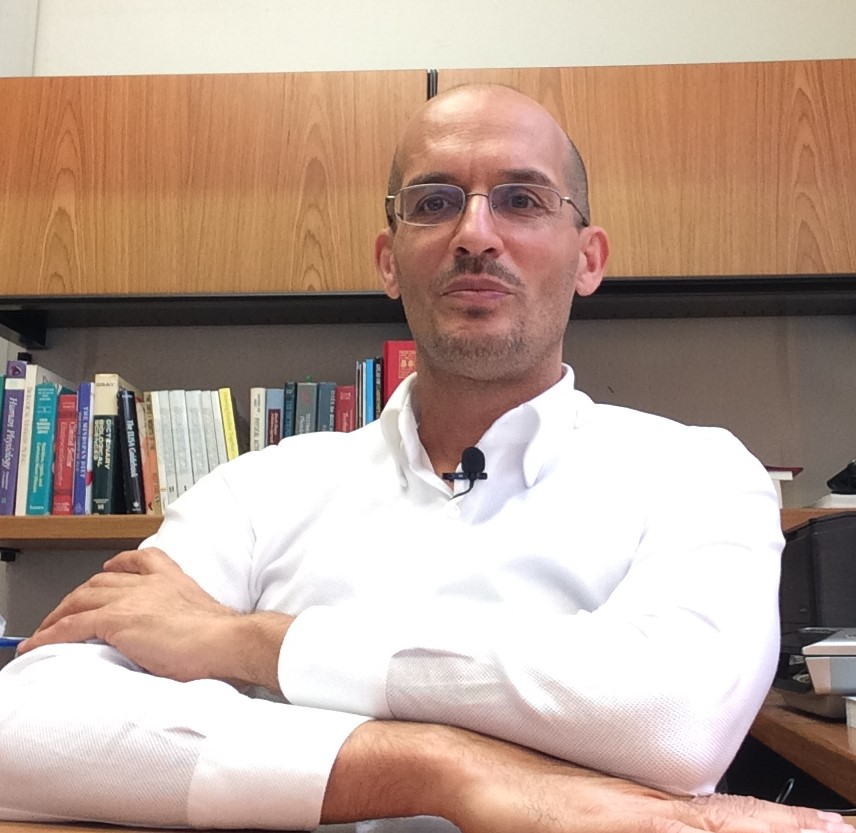
- Fontana in July 2017
- Born: Luigi N Fontana; Trento, Italy
- Education: University of Verona; University of Padova
- Occupations: Physician; Scientist; Professor; Author
- Writing career
- Years active: 1994–present
- Subjects: Metabolism; Aging; Nutrition; Preventive Medicine; Longevity
- Notable awards: 2016 AFAR Cristofalo Award
- Website: linkedin.com/in/luigi-fontana-md-phd-6383b1b0

Luigi Fontana is a physician scientist who studies healthy longevity, with a focus on calorie restriction, endurance exercise and metabolism. He is the Leonard P Ullmann Chair in Translational Metabolic Health at the Charles Perkins Centre, where he directs the Charles Perkins Centre Royal Prince Alfred Clinic and the CPC RPA Health for Life Research, Educational and Clinical Program. He is also a professor of medicine and nutrition in the Faculty of Medicine and Health at the University of Sydney and a clinical academic in the Department of Endocrinology at the Royal Prince Alfred Hospital in Sydney, Australia. Fontana was a professor of medicine and co-director of the Healthy Longevity Program at Washington University School of Medicine.

== Education ==
Fontana received his medical training at the University of Verona in Italy and graduated in 1994. After two years at the University of Verona Medical School, Fontana joined the Laboratory of Clinical Pharmacology at the King's College School of Medicine, University of London in 1997. He returned to University of Verona in 1998 to become Chief Medical Resident in Internal and Emergency Medicine and graduated in 1999. In 2004 he completed his PhD in Metabolism at the University of Padua School of Medicine in Italy.

== Honors ==
He is the recipient of three awards: the 2009 American Federation for Aging Research (AFAR) Breakthroughs in Gerontology Award, the 2011 Glenn Award for Research in Biological Mechanisms of Aging, and the 2016 Vincent Cristofalo Award of the American Federation for Aging Research. He was a scientific member of the board of directors of the American Aging Association, and is the editor in chief of the scientific journal Nutrition and Healthy Aging.

== Research ==
His research has focused on dietary restriction and its effects on aging and the prevention of age-associated chronic disease. Around 2012 he started a long-term study of 45 members of the Calorie Restriction Society and age-matched endurance athletes with the intention of tracking their health for around 12 years each. He also has been a primary investigator in the CALERIE trial, which started in 2007, in which people were placed on a diet with 25% fewer calories and received regular counseling to help them remain on it. He is now considered to be one of the world-leading scientists in the field of nutrition and healthy aging in humans.

Fontana and his laboratory are focussed on understanding the role of specific nutrition (e.g. calorie restriction, fasting, protein restriction, plant-based diet) and aerobic exercise interventions in preventing and treating multiple age-related diseases that share a common metabolic substrate. This approach is based on evidence from the "biology of ageing" field showing that targeting well-characterized metabolic and molecular pathways can inhibit the accumulation of cellular and tissue damage, and extend healthspan and influence the clinical progression of multiple chronic conditions.

== Nutrition and environmental health ==
Fontana has an interest in the role of nutrition in promoting environmental health. In 2013, he wrote a perspective article with Daniel Kammen on the beneficial role of efficient use of energy and food in promoting human, environmental, and planetary health, and sustainable economic development.

== Publications ==
As of 2019 his most-cited and influential papers were:

- Fontana, L; Partridge, L; Longo, VD (2010). "Extending healthy life span--from yeast to humans". Science. 328 (5976): 321–6. Bibcode:2010Sci...328..321F. doi:10.1126/science.1172539. PMC 3607354. PMID 20395504.
- Fontana, L; Kennedy, BK; Longo, VD; Seals, D; Melov, S (2014). "Medical research: treat ageing". Nature. 511 (7510): 405–7. Bibcode:2014Natur.511..405F. doi:10.1038/511405a. PMID 25056047.
- Fontana, L; Partridge, L (2015). "Promoting health and longevity through diet: from model organisms to humans". Cell. 161 (1): 106–118. doi:10.1016/j.cell.2015.02.020. PMC 4547605. PMID 25815989.
- Muegge, BD; Kuczynski, J; Knights, D; Clemente, JC; González, A; Fontana, L; Henrissat, B; Knight, R; Gordon, JI (2011). "Diet drives convergence in gut microbiome functions across mammalian phylogeny and within humans". Science. 332 (6032): 970–4. Bibcode:2011Sci...332..970M. doi:10.1126/science.1198719. PMC 3303602. PMID 21596990.
- Dey, N; Wagner, VE; Blanton, LV; Cheng, J; Fontana, L; Haque, R; Ahmed, T; Gordon, JI (2015). "Regulators of gut motility revealed by a gnotobiotic model of diet-microbiome interactions related to travel". Cell. 163 (1): 95–107. doi:10.1016/j.cell.2015.08.059. PMC 4583712. PMID 26406373.
- Klein, S; Fontana, L; Young, VL; Coggan, AR; Kilo, C; Patterson, BW; Mohammed, BS (2004). "Absence of an effect of liposuction on insulin action and risk factors for coronary heart disease". The New England Journal of Medicine. 350 (25): 2549–57. doi:10.1056/NEJMoa033179. PMID 15201411.
- Fontana, L; Klein, S (2007). "Aging, adiposity, and calorie restriction". JAMA. 297 (9): 986–94. doi:10.1001/jama.297.9.986. PMID 17341713. S2CID 38413539.
- Fontana, L; Meyer, TE; Klein, S; Holloszy, JO (2004). "Long-term calorie restriction is highly effective in reducing the risk for atherosclerosis in humans". Proceedings of the National Academy of Sciences of the United States of America. 101 (17): 6659–63. Bibcode:2004PNAS..101.6659F. doi:10.1073/pnas.0308291101. PMC 404101. PMID 15096581.
- Fontana, L; Eagon, JC; Trujillo, ME; Scherer, PE; Klein, S (2007). "Visceral fat adipokine secretion is associated with systemic inflammation in obese humans". Diabetes. 56 (4): 1010–3. doi:10.2337/db06-1656. PMID 17287468.
- Meyer, TE; Kovacs, SJ; Ehsani, AA; Klein, S; Holloszy, JO; Fontana, L (2006). "Long-term caloric restriction ameliorates the decline in diastolic function in humans". J Am Coll Cardiol. 47 (2): 398–402. doi:10.1016/j.jacc.2005.08.069. PMID 16412867.
- Kraus, WE; Bhapkar, M; Huffman, KM; Pieper, CF; Krupa Das, S; Redman, LM; Villareal, DT; Rochon, J; Roberts, SB; Ravussin, E; Holloszy, JO; Fontana, L (2019). "2 years of calorie restriction and cardiometabolic risk (CALERIE): exploratory outcomes of a multicentre, phase 2, randomised controlled trial". Lancet Diabetes Endocrinol. 7 (9): 673–683. doi:10.1016/S2213-8587(19)30151-2. PMC 6707879. PMID 31303390.
- Mittendorfer, B; Klein, S; Fontana, L (2020). "A word of caution against excessive protein intake". Nat Rev Endocrinol. 16 (1): 59–66. doi:10.1038/s41574-019-0274-7. PMID 31728051. S2CID 208016442.

== Books ==
- Berrino F, Fontana L. La Grande Via: Nutrizione, Movimento, Meditazione. Mondadori Editori, 2017. ISBN 978-8804682516
- Fontana L, Vittorio Fusari. La felicità ha il sapore della salute. Slow Food Editore, 2018. ISBN 978-8884995162
- Fontana L, Vittorio Fusari. La table de longue vie. Éditions du Rouergue, 2019. ISBN 978-2812617843
- Fontana L. The Path to Longevity. Hardie Grant Publishing, 2020. ISBN 9781743795965
