= The Journal of Nutrition, Health and Aging =

- Discipline: Nutrition science, gerontology
- Language: English
- Edited by: John Morley

Publication details
- History: 1997-present
- Publisher: Springer Science+Business Media
- Frequency: Monthly
- Impact factor: 2.996 (2014)

Standard abbreviations
- ISO 4: J. Nutr. Health Aging

Indexing
- ISSN: 1279-7707 (print); 1760-4788 (web)
- OCLC no.: 41126945

Links
- Journal homepage; Online archive

The Journal of Nutrition, Health and Aging is a monthly peer-reviewed medical journal covering nutrition science as it relates to gerontology. It was established in 1997 and is published by Springer Science+Business Media. The editor-in-chief is John Morley. According to the Journal Citation Reports, the journal has a 2021 impact factor of 5.285.
