= Xenobiotica =

- Discipline: Pharmacology, toxicology
- Language: English
- Edited by: Costas Ioannides

Publication details
- History: 1971-present
- Publisher: Informa (United Kingdom)
- Frequency: Monthly
- Impact factor: 2.199 (2014)

Standard abbreviations
- ISO 4: Xenobiotica

Indexing
- CODEN: XENOBH
- ISSN: 0049-8254 (print); 1366-5928 (web)
- LCCN: 75616763
- OCLC no.: 01588798

Links
- Journal homepage; RSS

Xenobiotica is a peer-reviewed medical journal that publishes comprehensive research papers on all areas of xenobiotics. It is published by Informa plc and covers six main areas:

- General xenobiochemistry, including in vitro studies concerned with the metabolism, disposition and excretion of drugs, and other xenobiotics, as well as the structure, function and regulation of associated enzymes
- Clinical pharmacokinetics and metabolism, covering the pharmacokinetics and absorption, distribution, metabolism and excretion of drugs and other xenobiotics in man.
- Animal pharmacokinetics and metabolism, covering the pharmacokinetics, and absorption, distribution, metabolism and excretion of drugs and other xenobiotics in animals.
- Pharmacogenetics, defined as the identification and functional characterisation of polymorphic genes that encode xenobiotic metabolising enzymes and transporters that may result in altered enzymatic, cellular and clinical responses to xenobiotics.
- Molecular toxicology, concerning the mechanisms of toxicity and the study of toxicology of xenobiotics at the molecular level.
- Topics in xenobiochemistry, in the form of reviews and commentaries are primarily intended to be a critical analysis of the issue, wherein the author offers opinions on the relevance of data or of a particular experimental approach or methodology.

According to the Journal Citation Reports, the journal received a 2014 impact factor of 2.199, ranking it 134th out of 254 journals in the category Pharmacology & Pharmacy and 50th out of 87 journals in the category Toxicology.

The editor in chief is Costas Ioannides (University of Surrey).

== Abstracting and indexing ==
Xenobiotica is abstracted and indexed in Biochemistry and Biophysics Citation Index, BIOSIS, Chemical Abstracts; Current Contents/Life Science, EBSCO, Science Citation Index, PASCAL, SciSearch, Scopus, and Index Medicus/MEDLINE/PubMed.
