= Cardiovascular Diabetology =

Academic journal

- Discipline: Cardiology, diabetology
- Language: English
- Edited by: Enrique Fisman co-founder and editor-in-chief, Francisco Westermeier deputy editor

Publication details
- History: 2002-present
- Publisher: BioMed Central
- Open access: Yes
- License: Creative Commons Attribution
- Impact factor: 15.6 (2025)

Standard abbreviations
- ISO 4: Cardiovasc. Diabetol.

Indexing
- ISSN: 1475-2840
- OCLC no.: 848273564

Links
- Journal homepage; Online access

Cardiovascular Diabetology is a peer-reviewed open access medical journal covering the intersection of cardiology and diabetology, meaning the connection between diabetes, metabolic syndrome and cardiovascular diseases. It is published by BioMed Central (a part of Springer Nature since 2008) and was established in 2002, with professors Enrique Fisman (Tel Aviv University) and Alexander Tenenbaum (Sheba Medical Center) as founding editors-in-chief. Alexander Tenenbaum died in 2022. In 2024, Dr. Francisco Westermeier (FH Joanneum) was appointed deputy editor. In addition, the journal currently has 80 associate editors.

== Scope ==
Cardiovascular Diabetology considers for publications manuscripts on all aspects of the diabetes/cardiovascular interrelationship, including clinical, genetic, experimental, pharmacological, epidemiological, molecular biology and laboratory research. Seven article types maybe considered for publication: original investigations, reviews, case reports, commentaries, hypotheses, methodology articles and study protocols; most of published papers are original investigations. Articles are published online upon acceptance, rather than in issues. A printed version is periodically distributed in India by Panacea Biotec Ltd.

== Abstracting and indexing ==
The journal is abstracted and indexed in Baidu, Chemical Abstracts Service (CAS), Citebase, Current Contents, Dimensions (database), EBSCO Information Services, Directory of Open Access Journals (DOAJ), EMBASE, Japanese Science and Technology Agency (JST), MEDLINE/PubMed, Naver, Science Citation Index, SCImago Journal Rank, Scopus, Socolar, Wanfang and several additional scientific repositories. According to the Journal Citation Reports, the journal has a 2025 impact factor of 15.6, ranking it in the 95.2 JIF percentile (10 out of 198 journals) in the category of "Endocrinology & Metabolism", and in the 97.3 JIF percentile (7 out of 237 journals) in the category "Cardiac & Cardiovascular Systems" journals.
