= Archive of Applied Mechanics =

- Discipline: Mechanics, engineering
- Language: English
- Edited by: Jörg Schröder

Publication details
- Former name(s): Ingenieur-Archiv
- History: 1929–present
- Publisher: Springer
- Frequency: Monthly
- Impact factor: 2.8 (2022)

Standard abbreviations
- ISO 4: Arch. Appl. Mech.

Indexing
- CODEN: INARAS
- ISSN: 0939-1533 (print); 1432-0681 (web)
- LCCN: 93643351
- OCLC no.: 60637712

Links
- Journal homepage

The Archive of Applied Mechanics is a peer-reviewed scientific journal established in 1929 as Ingenieur-Archiv by R. Grammel. It obtained its current name in 1991 and is published by Springer. The journal covers research findings on the performance of construction materials. The editor in chief is Jörg Schröder (University of Duisburg-Essen).

== Scope ==
Archive of Applied Mechanics serves as a platform to communicate original research of scholarly value in all branches of theoretical and applied mechanics, i.e., in solid and fluid mechanics, dynamics and vibrations. It focuses on continuum mechanics in general, structural mechanics, biomechanics, micro- and nano-mechanics as well as hydrodynamics. In particular, the following topics are emphasised: thermodynamics of materials, material modeling, multi-physics, mechanical properties of materials, homogenisation, phase transitions, fracture and damage mechanics, vibration, wave propagation experimental mechanics as well as machine learning techniques in the context of applied mechanics.

New analytical, numerical and experimental methods suited to research in the above-mentioned subjects are welcome. Manuscripts reporting results obtained with established methods, without contributing to scientific knowledge, are not encouraged.

== Abstracting and indexing ==
The journal is abstracted and indexed in: Academic OneFile, Academic Search, Compendex, ProQuest, Current Contents/Engineering, Computing and Technology, INIS Atomindex, Journal Citation Reports, Materials Science Citation Index, Science Citation Index Expanded, Scopus, and Zentralblatt MATH.
