= Journal of Veterinary Science =

- Discipline: Veterinary medicine
- Language: English

Publication details
- History: 2000 - present
- Publisher: Korean Society of Veterinary Science (Korea)
- Open access: yes
- Impact factor: 1.8 (5-year impact 1.904) (2020)

Standard abbreviations
- ISO 4: J. Vet. Sci.

Indexing
- ISSN: 1229-845X (print); 1976-555X (web)

Links
- Journal homepage

The Journal of Veterinary Science (JVS) is a peer-reviewed and open access scientific journal covering animal health published bimonthly by the Korean Society of Veterinary Science, who distribute it worldwide. It was launched in 2000.

The journal covers both scientific and technological aspects of veterinary medical sciences. This includes preventative medicine, biomedical sciences, and veterinary humanities and social sciences.

The JVS publishes research reports, review articles, rapid communications, case reports, guidelines and recommendations, perspectives, letters to the editor, and editorials.
