= Nutrition in Clinical Practice =

- Discipline: Nutrition
- Language: English
- Edited by: Russell Merritt

Publication details
- History: 1986-present
- Publisher: Wiley on behalf of the American Society for Parenteral and Enteral Nutrition (United States)
- Frequency: Bimonthly
- Open access: Hybrid open access
- Impact factor: 3.080 (2020)

Standard abbreviations
- ISO 4: Nutr. Clin. Pract.

Indexing
- CODEN: NCPREH
- ISSN: 0884-5336 (print); 1941-2452 (web)
- LCCN: sn85006580
- OCLC no.: 750672680

Links
- Journal homepage; Online access; Online archive

Nutrition in Clinical Practice is a peer-reviewed medical journal that covers the scientific basis and clinical application of nutrition and nutrition support research. The journal was established in 1986 with Philip Schneider as the founding editor. The current editor-in-chief is Russell Merritt. It is an official publication of the American Society for Parenteral and Enteral Nutrition and is published by Wiley.

== Abstracting and indexing ==
The journal is indexed and abstracted in the following bibliographic databases:

- Abstracts on Hygiene & Communicable Diseases
- AgBiotechNet
- Agricultural Economics Database
- Agricultural Engineering Abstracts
- CAB Abstracts
- Chemical Abstracts Service
- CINAHL
- Current Contents: Clinical Medicine
- Dairy Science Abstracts
- Embase
- Environmental Impact
- Global Health
- Horticultural Science Abstracts
- Maize Abstracts
- MEDLINE/PubMed
- Nutrition & Food Sciences Database
- Parasitology Database
- Plant Protection Database
- Rice Abstracts
- Rural Development Abstracts
- Science Citation Index Expanded
- Scopus
- Soybean Abstracts Online
- Sugar Industry Abstracts
- Web of Science
- Wheat, Barley & Triticale Abstracts
- World Agricultural Economics & Rural Sociology Abstracts

According to the Journal Citation Reports, its 2020 impact factor is 3.080, ranking it 59 out of 89 journals in the category "Nutrition & Dietetics".

== Editors ==
- Philip Schneider, 1986-1995
- Peggi Guenter, 1996-2000
- Charles W. Van Way III, 2003-2007
- Sarah Miller, 2003
- Jeanette M. Hasse, 2003–2023
- Russell J. Merritt, 2023– present
