= Veterinary Immunology and Immunopathology =

Peer-reviewed medical journal

Veterinary Immunology & Immunopathology
- Cover of volume 235 from May 2021.
- Discipline: Allergy, immunology, veterinary medicine
- Language: English
- Edited by: E.J. Glass, J-P. Scheerlinck, S. Sharif

Publication details
- History: 1979–present
- Publisher: Elsevier
- Frequency: Biweekly
- Open access: Hybrid
- Impact factor: 2.046 (2020)

Standard abbreviations
- ISO 4: Vet. Immunol. Immunopathol.

Indexing
- CODEN: VIIMDS
- ISSN: 0165-2427 (print); 1873-2534 (web)
- OCLC no.: 05867096

Links
- Journal homepage; Online access

Veterinary Immunology and Immunopathology is a peer-reviewed medical journal covering allergy and immunology in the domain of veterinary medicine.
