= Waste Management & Research =

Waste Management and Research
- Discipline: Waste management
- Language: English
- Edited by: P. Agamuthu

Publication details
- History: 1983–present
- Publisher: SAGE Publications on behalf of the International Solid Waste Association
- Frequency: Monthly
- Impact factor: 1.114 (2013)

Standard abbreviations
- ISO 4: Waste Manag. Res.

Indexing
- CODEN: WMARD8
- ISSN: 0734-242X (print); 1096-3669 (web)
- LCCN: 83645730
- OCLC no.: 609908582

Links
- Journal homepage; Online access; Online archive

Waste Management and Research is a peer-reviewed scientific journal covering the field of waste management.

== Information ==
The editor-in-chief is P. Agamuthu (University of Malaya). It was established in 1983 and is published by SAGE Publications on behalf of the International Solid Waste Association.

== Abstracting and indexing ==
The journal is abstracted and indexed in Scopus, and the Science Citation Index Expanded.

According to the Journal Citation Reports, its 2013 impact factor is 1.114, ranking it 32nd out of 44 journals in the category "Engineering, Environmental" and 151st out of 215 journals in the category "Environmental Sciences".

== See also ==
- Environmental Earth Sciences
