= Journal of Radiation Protection and Research =

Radiation Journal

- Discipline: Radiation protection
- Language: English
- Edited by: Chan Hyeong Kim, Takeshi Iimoto, Riaz Akber

Publication details
- Former name: Bangsaseonbang-eohakoeji
- History: 1976–present
- Publisher: Korean Association for Radiation Protection
- Frequency: Quarterly
- Open access: Yes
- License: CC BY-NC 4.0

Standard abbreviations
- ISO 4: J. Radiat. Prot. Res.

Indexing
- ISSN: 2508-1888 (print); 2466-2461 (web)
- OCLC no.: 973453706
- Bangsaseonbang-eohakoeji
- ISSN: 0253-4231

Links
- Journal homepage; Online access; Online archive

The Journal of Radiation Protection and Research is a quarterly peer-reviewed scientific journal covering research in radiation protection covering both ionizing radiation and non-ionizing radiation. The journal was established in 1976 as Bangsaseonbang-eohakoeji (English: Journal of Radiation Protection), obtaining its current name in 2016. It is published by the Korean Association for Radiation Protection and the editors-in-chief are Chan Hyeong Kim (Hanyang University), Takeshi Iimoto (University of Tokyo), and Riaz Akber (Safe Radiation Australia). In 2019 it became the official joint publication of three associate societies of the International Radiation Protection Association: the Korean Association for Radiation Protection, the Japan Health Physics Society, and the Australasian Radiation Protection Society.

== Abstracting and indexing ==
The journal is abstracted and indexed in

- International Nuclear Information System
- Scopus
- Emerging Sources Citation Index - Web of Science
