= Journal of Parenteral and Enteral Nutrition =

- Discipline: Nutrition, dietetics
- Language: English
- Edited by: Kenneth B. Christopher

Publication details
- History: 1977-present
- Publisher: Wiley on behalf of the American Society for Parenteral and Enteral Nutrition (United States)
- Frequency: 8 issues per year
- Open access: Hybrid open-access
- Impact factor: 4.1 (2024)

Standard abbreviations
- ISO 4: J. Parenter. Enter. Nutr.

Indexing
- CODEN: JPENDU
- ISSN: 0148-6071 (print); 1941-2444 (web)
- LCCN: 77643156
- OCLC no.: 610588383

Links
- Journal homepage; Online access; Online archive

The Journal of Parenteral and Enteral Nutrition is a peer-reviewed medical journal that publishes papers in the field of nutrition and dietetics. The journal was established in 1977 with Michael D. Caldwell as the founding editor. The current editor-in-chief is Kenneth B. Christopher. It is the official publication of the American Society for Parenteral and Enteral Nutrition and is published by Wiley.

== Abstracting and indexing ==
The journal is abstracted and indexed in:

- Biological Abstracts
- Chemical Abstracts Service
- CINAHL
- Current Contents: Clinical Medicine
- Embase
- Global Health
- MEDLINE/PubMed
- Nutrition & Food Sciences Database
- Nutrition Abstracts & Reviews Series A: Human & Experimental
- Science Citation Index Expanded
- SCOPUS
- Tropical Diseases Bulletin
- Web of Science

According to the Journal Citation Reports, the journal has a 2024 impact factor of 4.1, ranking it 29 out of 112 journals in the category 'Nutrition & Dietetics'.

== Editors ==
- Michael D. Caldwell, 1977-1980
- Harry M. Shizgal, 1981-1990
- John L. Rombeau, 1991-1999
- Danny O. Jacobs, 2000-2002
- Charles W. Van Way III, 2003-2007
- Paul E. Wischmeyer, 2007-2010
- Kelly A. Tappenden, 2010-2022
- Kenneth B. Christopher, 2022–present
