= European Journal of Nutrition =

- Discipline: Nutrition science
- Language: English
- Edited by: Bruce Griffin

Publication details
- Former name: Zeitschrift für Ernährungswissenschaft
- History: 1960-present
- Publisher: Springer Science+Business Media
- Frequency: 8/year
- Impact factor: 4.449 (2018)

Standard abbreviations
- ISO 4: Eur. J. Nutr.

Indexing
- ISSN: 1436-6207 (print); 1436-6215 (web)
- LCCN: 64033714
- OCLC no.: 575018606

Links
- Journal homepage; Online archive

The European Journal of Nutrition is a peer-reviewed medical journal covering nutrition science. It was established in 1960 as Zeitschrift für Ernährungswissenschaft, obtaining its current name in 1999. It is published eight times per year by Springer Science+Business Media and the editor-in-chief is Bruce Griffin (University of Surrey). According to the Journal Citation Reports, the journal has a 2018 impact factor of 4.449. The Journal is included in the Index Medicus and in MEDLINE.
