= List of Canadian provinces and territories by life expectancy =

This is a list of Canadian provinces and territories by life expectancy. The country is administratively divided into 10 provinces and 3 territories. Life expectancy is the average number of years of age that a group of infants born in the same year can expect to live, if maintained, from birth. The source is from the Canadian Vital Statistics Death Database.

Life expectancy has increased in most Canadian provinces and territories due to medical advances in treating diseases such as heart disease and cancer - leading causes of death elsewhere worldwide. There were high gains in life expectancy in Nunavut due to improved rural health care; however, there were notable decreases in life expectancy in Newfoundland and Labrador.

According to estimation of Statistics Canada, in 2023 life expectancy in the country was 81.68 years (79.48 for male, 83.88 for female). This is still half a year less than in the pre-COVID 2019.

According to estimation of the United Nations, in 2023 life expectancy in Canada was 82.63 years (80.43 for male, 84.83 for female).

Estimation of the World Bank Group for 2023: 81.65 years total (79.51 for male, 83.89 for female).

According to estimation of the WHO for 2019, at that year life expectancy in Canada was 82.02 years (80.12 years for male and 83.90 years for female).
And healthy life expectancy was 70.30 years (69.66 years for male and 70.91 years for female).

== Life expectancy in 2024 at birth ==
By default, the table is sorted by 2024.

province	2019				2019 →2023	2023				2023 →2024	2024				2019 →2024
province	overall	male	female	F Δ M	2019 →2023	overall	male	female	F Δ M	2023 →2024	overall	male	female	F Δ M	2019 →2024
Canada on average	82.22	80.10	84.32	4.22	−0.54	81.68	79.48	83.88	4.40	0.48	82.16	80.03	84.29	4.26	−0.06
Ontario	82.55	80.38	84.67	4.29	−0.26	82.29	80.09	84.49	4.40	0.56	82.85	80.68	84.99	4.31	0.30
Quebec	82.84	80.92	84.71	3.79	−0.32	82.52	80.73	84.28	3.55	0.13	82.65	80.90	84.39	3.49	−0.19
British Columbia	82.74	80.55	84.96	4.41	−0.78	81.96	79.30	84.73	5.43	0.62	82.58	80.16	85.07	4.91	−0.16
Alberta	81.96	79.86	84.11	4.25	−1.25	80.71	78.38	83.15	4.77	0.82	81.53	79.32	83.87	4.55	−0.43
Nova Scotia	80.43	78.48	82.29	3.81	0.06	80.49	78.32	82.75	4.43	0.21	80.70	78.59	82.85	4.26	0.27
New Brunswick	80.71	78.45	83.00	4.55	−0.30	80.41	78.40	82.46	4.06	0.03	80.44	78.44	82.49	4.05	−0.27
Saskatchewan	80.50	78.24	82.95	4.71	−1.52	78.98	76.70	81.38	4.68	0.68	79.66	77.43	82.05	4.62	−0.84
Newfoundland and Labrador	80.07	78.05	82.13	4.08	−1.04	79.03	76.98	81.08	4.10	0.58	79.61	77.56	81.59	4.03	−0.46
Manitoba	80.19	78.03	82.54	4.51	−1.11	79.08	76.84	81.47	4.63	0.21	79.29	76.93	81.85	4.92	−0.90

Data source: Statistics Canada.

3-year average. By default, the table is sorted by 2022–2024 period.

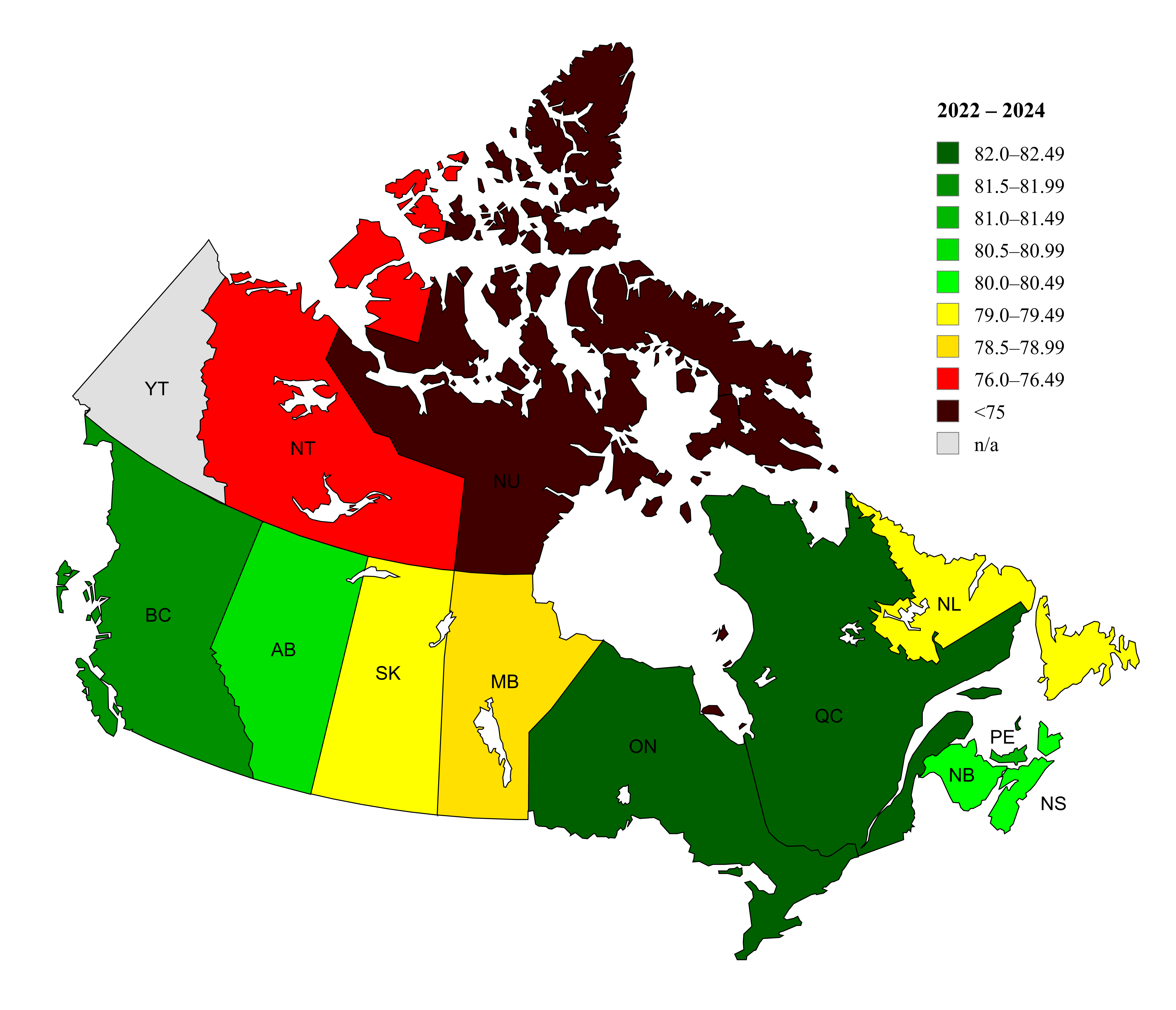
Life expectancy in Canada in 2022–2024

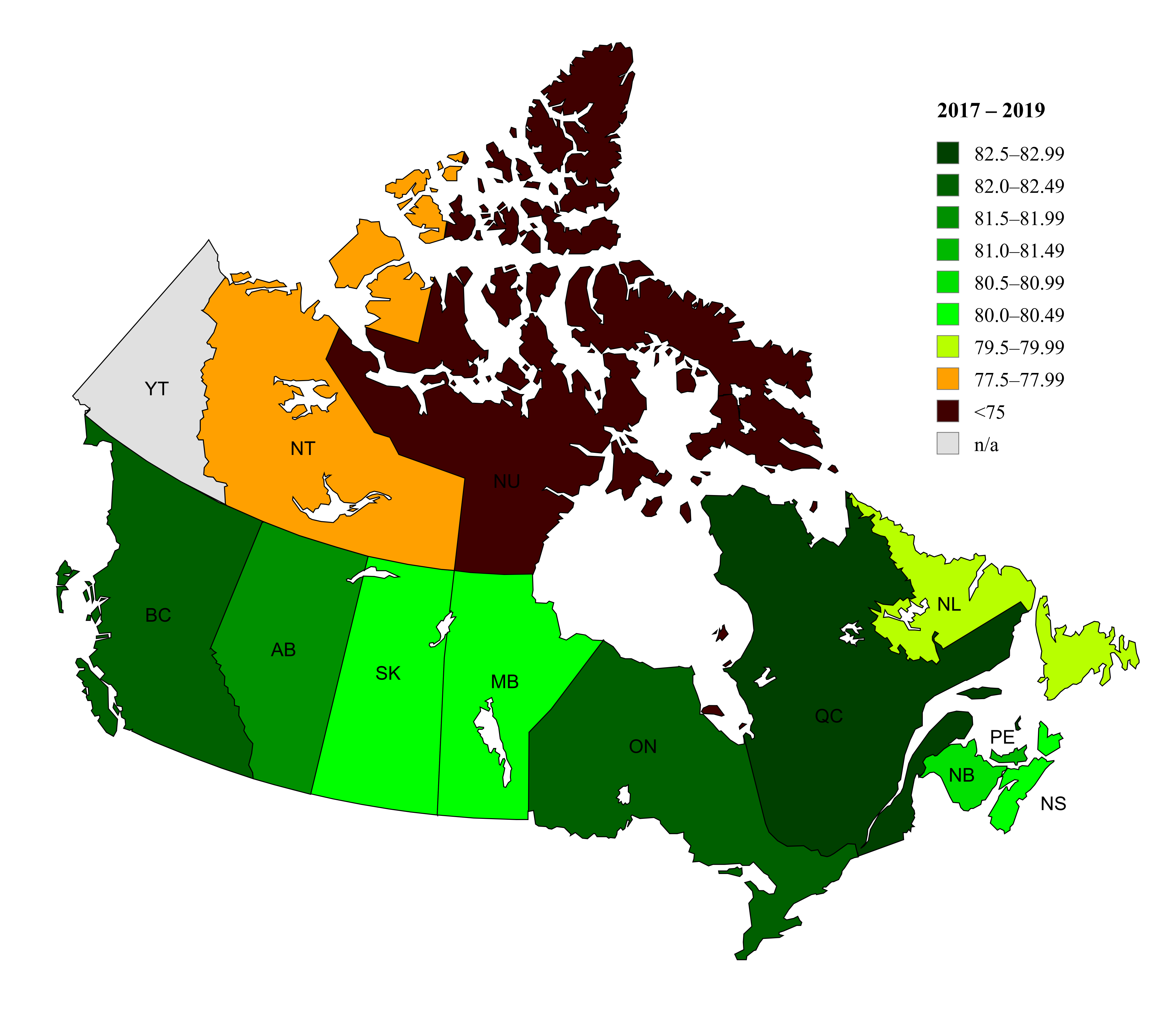
Life expectancy in Canada in 2017–2019

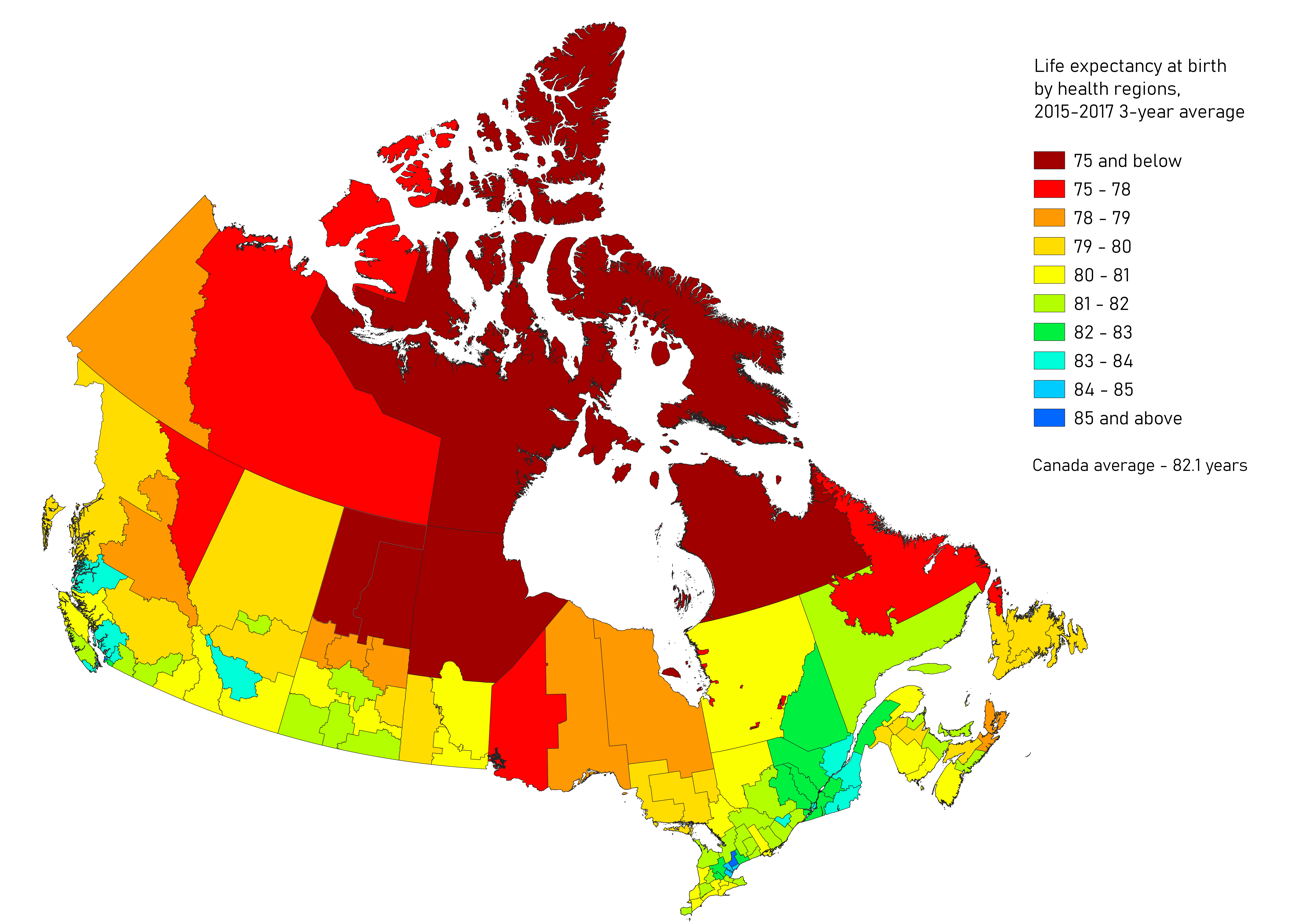
Life expectancy by health regions in Canada in 2015–2017, 3-year average. (Note: 2014-2016 3-year average for Yukon)

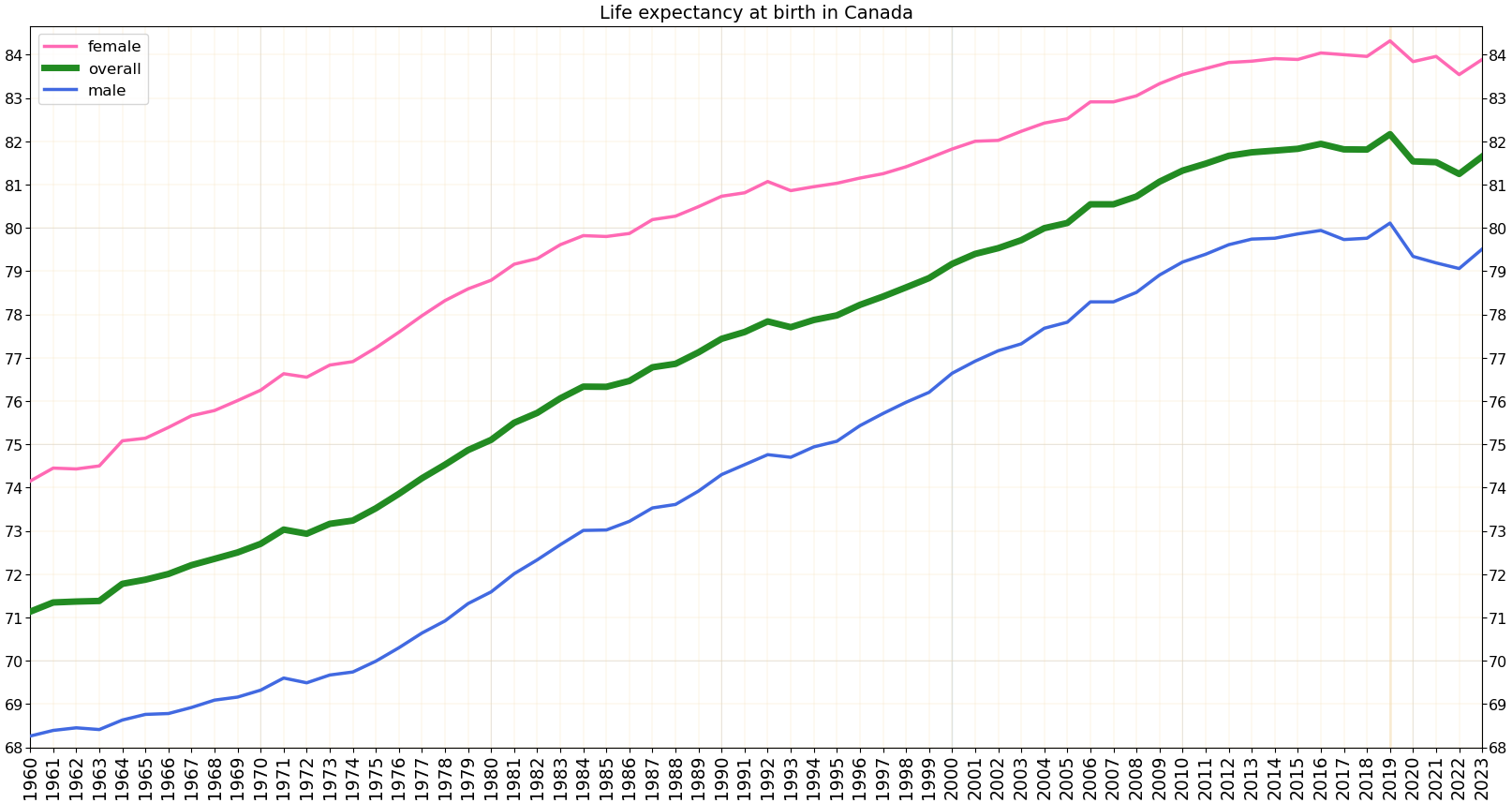
Development of life expectancy in Canada according to estimation of the World Bank Group

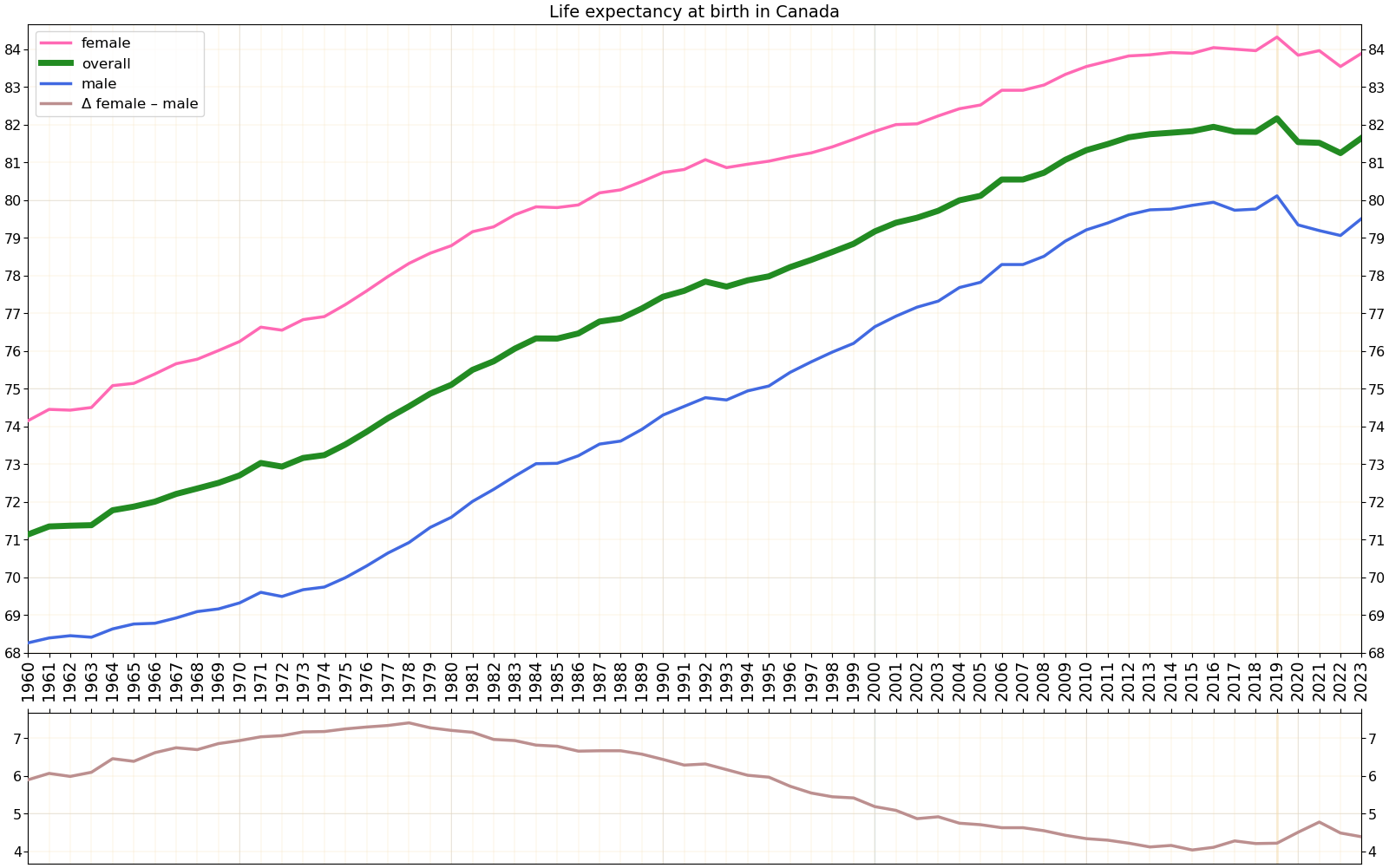
Life expectancy with calculated gender gap

Life expectancy in Canada according to estimation of the Our World in Data

Life expectancy in Canada and the US

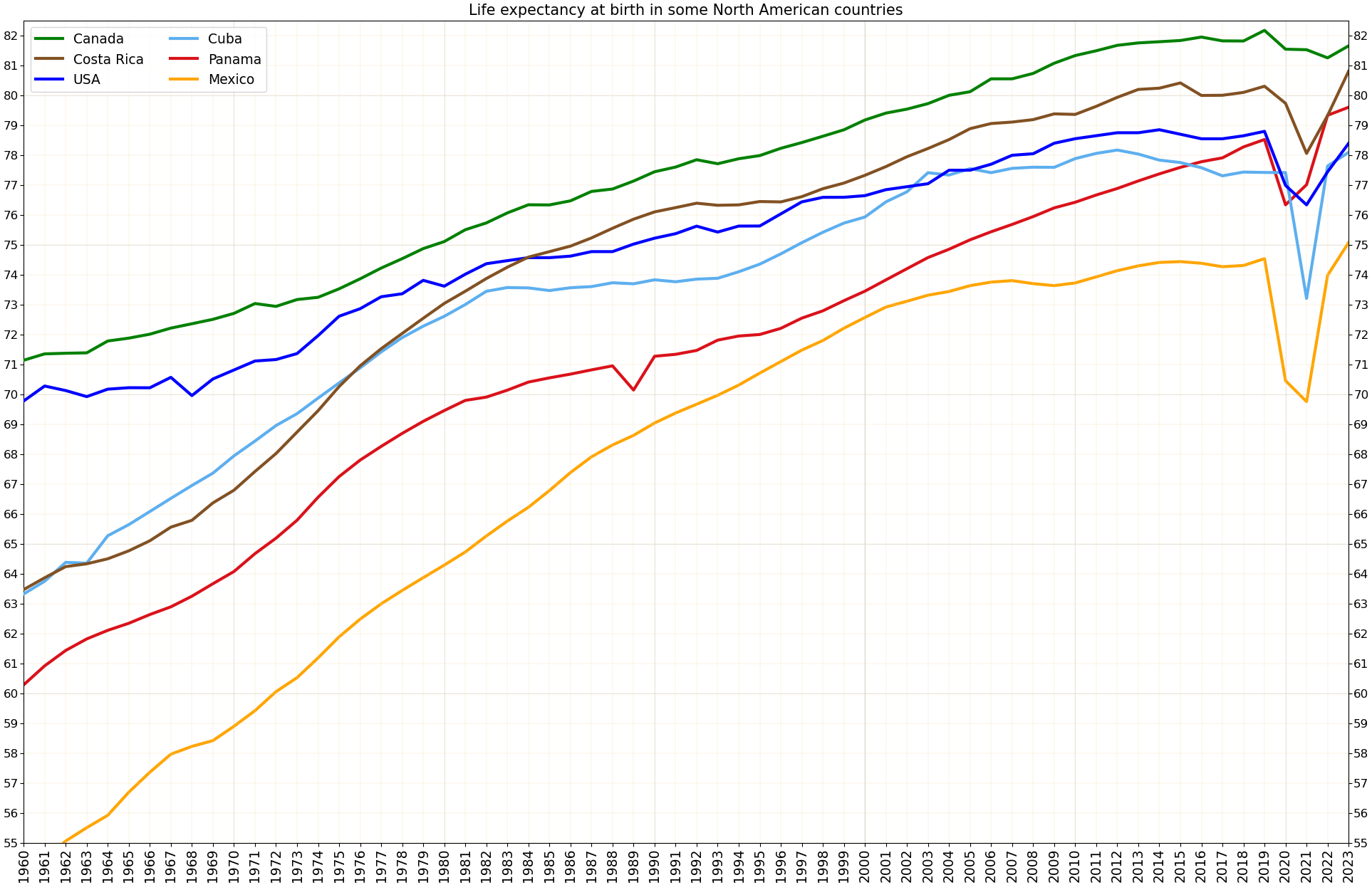
Development of life expectancy in Canada in comparison to other big countries of North America

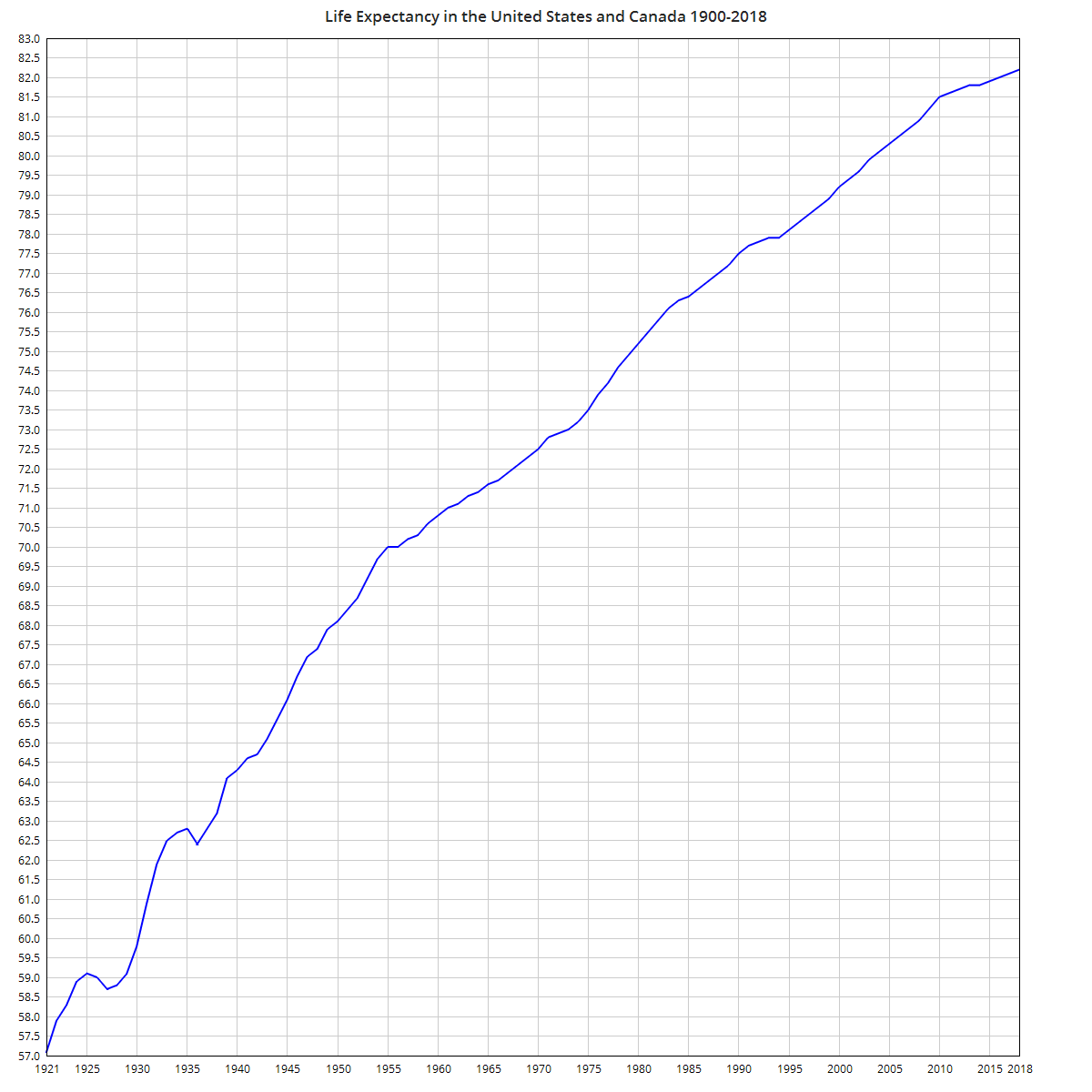
Life Expectancy in Canada 1921–2018

Life expectancy and healthy life expectancy in Canada on the background of other countries of the world in 2019

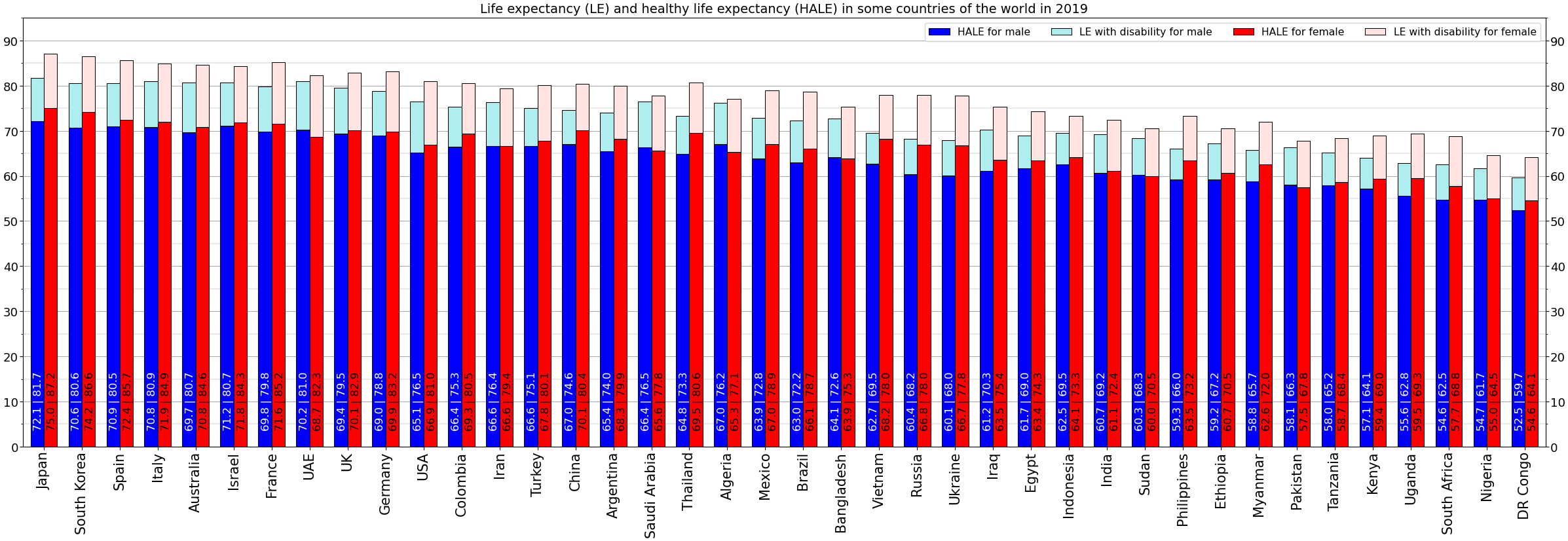
Life expectancy and healthy life expectancy for males and females

province or territory	2017–2019				Δ1	2021–2023				Δ2	2022–2024				Δ total
province or territory	overall	male	female	F Δ M	Δ1	overall	male	female	F Δ M	Δ2	overall	male	female	F Δ M	Δ total
Canada on average	81.99	79.86	84.09	4.23	−0.56	81.43	79.16	83.72	4.56	0.22	81.65	79.47	83.86	4.39	−0.34
Quebec	82.56	80.68	84.34	3.66	−0.12	82.44	80.56	84.26	3.70	−0.05	82.39	80.60	84.14	3.54	−0.17
Ontario	82.39	80.25	84.46	4.21	−0.43	81.96	79.68	84.23	4.55	0.31	82.27	80.06	84.47	4.41	−0.12
British Columbia	82.32	79.95	84.75	4.80	−0.75	81.57	78.87	84.39	5.52	0.41	81.98	79.38	84.69	5.31	−0.34
Prince Edward Island	81.21	78.96	83.41	4.45	−0.32	80.89	78.58	83.11	4.53	0.27	81.16	79.01	83.20	4.19	−0.05
Alberta	81.58	79.33	83.91	4.58	−1.22	80.36	77.93	82.92	4.99	0.45	80.81	78.52	83.20	4.68	−0.77
Nova Scotia	80.40	78.34	82.43	4.09	−0.19	80.21	78.00	82.51	4.51	0.09	80.30	78.13	82.53	4.40	−0.10
New Brunswick	80.69	78.52	82.80	4.28	−0.44	80.25	78.19	82.38	4.19	−0.13	80.12	78.07	82.24	4.17	−0.57
Newfoundland and Labrador	79.97	77.97	81.98	4.01	−0.83	79.14	77.05	81.21	4.16	0.03	79.17	77.14	81.22	4.08	−0.80
Saskatchewan	80.27	77.97	82.71	4.74	−1.62	78.65	76.30	81.17	4.87	0.37	79.02	76.74	81.47	4.73	−1.25
Manitoba	80.03	77.87	82.23	4.36	−1.14	78.89	76.43	81.49	5.06	0.01	78.90	76.49	81.45	4.96	−1.13
Northwest Territories	77.59	75.66	79.64	3.98	−0.96	76.63	73.72	79.75	6.03	−0.34	76.29	73.86	79.11	5.25	−1.30
Nunavut	70.65	68.60	72.76	4.16	0.13	70.78	68.50	73.27	4.77	0.06	70.84	69.50	72.17	2.67	0.19

Data source: Statistics Canada. There are no data for Yukon for given periods. In 2014–2016 overall life expectancy in this territory was 78.67 years (75.90 for male and 81.47 for female).

== Life expectancy by health region, 2015–2017 ==
Health regions are administrative areas defined by provincial and territorial governments to administer and deliver public health care to Canadian residents.

Health Region	Province	Life Expectancy	Male	Female
Eastern	Newfoundland and Labrador	79.7	77.6	81.8
Central	Newfoundland and Labrador	79.5	77.7	81.3
Western	Newfoundland and Labrador	79.5	78	80.8
Labrador-Grenfell	Newfoundland and Labrador	77.9	75.7	80.3
Prince Edward Island	Prince Edward Island	82.0	79.9	83.8
Western	Nova Scotia	80.9	78.6	83.1
Northern	Nova Scotia	79.5	77.6	81.5
Eastern	Nova Scotia	78.5	75.6	81.4
Central	Nova Scotia	81.2	79.2	83.1
Moncton	New Brunswick	81.7	79.4	84
Saint John	New Brunswick	80.1	78	82.1
Fredericton	New Brunswick	80.9	79.1	82.6
Edmundston	New Brunswick	79.8	77.5	81.8
Campbellton	New Brunswick	79.4	76.5	82
Bathurst	New Brunswick	81.4	79.2	83.6
Miramichi	New Brunswick	79.5	76.2	82.6
Bas-Saint-Laurent	Quebec	82.2	80.1	84
Saguenay - Lac-Saint-Jean	Quebec	82.5	80.9	84
Capitale-Nationale	Quebec	83.3	81.4	84.9
Mauricie et du Centre-du-Québec	Quebec	82.3	80.1	84.3
Estrie	Quebec	83.1	81.1	84.9
Montréal	Quebec	83.1	81	85.1
Outaouais	Quebec	81.5	79.7	83.2
Abitibi-Témiscamingue	Quebec	80.4	78.5	82.3
Côte-Nord	Quebec	81.1	79.8	82.4
Nord-du-Québec	Quebec	80.6	79.3	81.4
Gaspésie - Îles-de-la-Madeleine	Quebec	80.8	78.7	82.8
Chaudière-Appalaches	Quebec	83.3	81.4	85.1
Laval	Quebec	83.9	81.9	85.6
Lanaudière	Quebec	82.1	80.6	83.6
Laurentides	Quebec	82.1	80.5	83.7
Montérégie	Quebec	82.8	81	84.4
Nunavik	Quebec	68.7	65.6	73
Terres-Cries-de-la-Baie-James	Quebec	77.2	75.4	78.7
Algoma	Ontario	79.4	77.2	81.6
Brant	Ontario	80.2	78.1	82.2
Durham	Ontario	82.5	80.6	84.4
Grey Bruce	Ontario	81.6	79.5	83.8
Haldimand-Norfolk	Ontario	80.2	78.3	82.1
Haliburton, Kawartha, Pine Ridge	Ontario	81.2	79.3	83.2
Halton	Ontario	84.5	82.6	86.2
Hamilton	Ontario	81.3	78.8	83.6
Hastings and Prince Edward	Ontario	80.1	77.8	82.4
Huron	Ontario	80.7	78.5	82.7
Chatham-Kent	Ontario	80.4	78.1	82.4
Kingston, Frontenac and Lennox and Addington	Ontario	81.5	79.1	83.8
Lambton	Ontario	80.5	78.3	82.7
Leeds, Grenville and Lanark	Ontario	81.3	79.4	83
Middlesex-London	Ontario	82.0	79.9	84
Niagara	Ontario	81.4	79.2	83.5
North Bay Parry Sound	Ontario	80.3	78.2	82.4
Northwestern	Ontario	76.6	74.7	78.6
Ottawa	Ontario	83.7	81.9	85.3
Oxford Elgin St. Thomas	Ontario	80.8	78.9	82.6
Peel	Ontario	84.8	83	86.4
Perth	Ontario	81.7	79.7	83.5
Peterborough	Ontario	81.5	79.3	83.5
Porcupine	Ontario	78.3	76.1	80.5
Renfrew	Ontario	81.1	79.2	83
Eastern	Ontario	81.2	79.1	83.2
Simcoe Muskoka	Ontario	81.6	79.7	83.4
Sudbury	Ontario	79.8	76.9	82.7
Thunder Bay	Ontario	78.9	76.8	81.1
Timiskaming	Ontario	79.3	76.9	81.7
Waterloo	Ontario	82.1	80.2	83.9
Wellington-Dufferin-Guelph	Ontario	82.3	80.5	83.9
Windsor-Essex	Ontario	81.7	79.7	83.7
York	Ontario	85.7	84	87.1
Toronto	Ontario	84.3	81.7	86.7
Winnipeg	Manitoba	80.8	78.6	82.8
Prairie Mountain	Manitoba	80.0	78	82.1
Interlake-Eastern	Manitoba	80.3	78.6	82.2
Northern	Manitoba	72.7	70.3	75.2
Southern	Manitoba	81.0	79.1	83.1
Sun Country	Saskatchewan	81.5	79.7	83.2
Five Hills	Saskatchewan	81.3	78.4	84
Cypress	Saskatchewan	81.4	79.3	83.5
Regina Qu'Appelle	Saskatchewan	80.5	78.2	82.8
Sunrise	Saskatchewan	79.5	76.7	82.4
Saskatoon	Saskatchewan	81.3	79.1	83.4
Heartland	Saskatchewan	80.9	78.2	83.7
Kelsey Trail	Saskatchewan	78.8	76.4	81.4
Prince Albert Parkland	Saskatchewan	78.3	75.4	81.6
Prairie North	Saskatchewan	78.8	76.1	81.7
Mamawetan/Keewatin/Athabasca	Saskatchewan	73.3	71	75.8
South	Alberta	80.3	78.1	82.4
Calgary	Alberta	83.1	81.2	85
Central	Alberta	79.9	77.4	82.6
Edmonton	Alberta	82	79.5	84.5
North	Alberta	79.2	77.1	81.7
East Kootenay	British Columbia	80.5	78.5	82.7
Kootenay-Boundary	British Columbia	80.4	77.9	82.8
Okanagan	British Columbia	81.2	78.7	83.8
Thompson/Cariboo	British Columbia	79.9	77.8	82.3
Fraser East	British Columbia	81.2	78.7	83.7
Fraser North	British Columbia	83.6	81.6	85.6
Fraser South	British Columbia	82.8	80.6	85
Richmond	British Columbia	86.8	85.2	88.2
Vancouver	British Columbia	84.1	81.6	86.6
North Shore/Coast Garibaldi	British Columbia	83.9	81.6	86.2
South Vancouver Island	British Columbia	83.3	81.1	85.3
Central Vancouver Island	British Columbia	81.3	79.2	83.3
North Vancouver Island	British Columbia	81	78.6	83.5
Northwest	British Columbia	79.1	76.9	81.7
Northern Interior	British Columbia	78.8	76.9	81
Northeast	British Columbia	78	76.4	79.6
Yukon	Yukon	78.7	75.9	81.5
Northwest Territories	Northwest Territories	77.1	75.2	79.3
Nunavut	Nunavut	72.1	70.8	73.4

== Life expectancy in 2020 at birth ==
Rank	Province/Territory	Life expectancy (2020)	3-year average (2018-2020)			3-year average (2008-2010)	Change
Rank	Province/Territory	Life expectancy (2020)	All	Male	Female	3-year average (2008-2010)	Change
1.	Quebec	82.34	82.57	80.77	84.31	81.24	▲1.27
2.	British Columbia	82.19	82.39	79.93	84.93	81.82	▲0.57
3.	Ontario	82.14	82.34	80.16	84.47	81.53	▲0.81
-	Canada	81.72	81.97	79.82	84.11	81.15	▲0.82
4.	Prince Edward Island	—	81.80	79.80	83.72	80.44	▲1.36
5.	Alberta	80.89	81.46	79.15	83.85	80.81	▲0.65
6.	New Brunswick	81.17	80.84	78.70	82.91	80.34	▲0.50
7.	Nova Scotia	80.58	80.46	78.37	82.55	80.17	▲0.29
8.	Saskatchewan	79.46	80.06	77.69	82.56	79.51	▲0.55
9.	Newfoundland and Labrador	79.66	79.89	77.93	81.87	79.28	▲0.61
10.	Manitoba	79.41	79.88	77.73	82.12	79.64	▲0.24
11.	Yukon	—	78.68	75.92	81.47	77.25	▲1.43
12.	Northwest Territories	—	77.00	75.10	78.88	76.77	▲0.23
13.	Nunavut	—	70.74	68.18	72.69	71.53	▼0.79

== Past life expectancy ==
Province/Territory	2019	2010	2000	1990	1980	Change 1980-2019
Canada	82.1	81.2	79.0	77.6	75.5	▲6.6
Alberta	81.6	81.3	79.4	77.8	75.0	▲6.6
British Columbia	82.4	82.1	80.3	78.1	76.0	▲6.4
Manitoba	80.1	79.9	78.0	77.4	75.3	▲4.8
New Brunswick	80.7	80.7	78.9	77.3	74.5	▲6.2
Newfoundland and Labrador	80.0	79.6	77.3	76.1	74.8	▲5.2
Northwest Territories	77.4	77.8	75.5	72.4	68.7	▲8.7
Nova Scotia	80.4	80.3	78.5	76.7	74.6	▲5.8
Nunavut	71.1	70.4	67.5	65.5	62.4	▲8.7
Ontario	82.4	81.7	79.4	77.8	75.4	▲7.0
Prince Edward Island	81.6	81.3	78.4	76.9	76.2	▲5.4
Quebec	82.9	81.4	79.0	77.0	74.4	▲8.5
Saskatchewan	80.3	79.6	78.5	77.9	75.9	▲4.4
Yukon	79.0	77.3	75.0	74.4	69.8	▲9.2

== Global Data Lab (2019–2022) ==
region	2019				2019 →2021	2021	2021 →2022	2022				2019 →2022
region	overall	male	female	F Δ M	2019 →2021	overall	2021 →2022	overall	male	female	F Δ M	2019 →2022
Canada on average	82.36	80.28	84.42	4.14	0.30	82.66	0.19	82.85	80.87	84.80	3.93	0.49
Quebec	82.97	81.23	84.62	3.39	0.29	83.26	0.19	83.45	81.83	85.00	3.17	0.48
British Columbia	82.79	80.39	85.24	4.85	0.29	83.08	0.19	83.27	80.98	85.62	4.64	0.48
Ontario	82.74	80.62	84.78	4.16	0.29	83.03	0.19	83.22	81.21	85.16	3.95	0.48
Prince Edward Island, Yukon, Northwest Territories, Nunavut	82.19	80.26	84.03	3.77	0.30	82.49	0.19	82.68	80.85	84.40	3.55	0.49
Alberta	81.85	79.60	84.16	4.56	0.29	82.14	0.19	82.33	80.19	84.54	4.35	0.48
New Brunswick	81.23	79.15	83.22	4.07	0.29	81.52	0.19	81.71	79.73	83.59	3.86	0.48
Nova Scotia	80.85	78.82	82.85	4.03	0.28	81.13	0.19	81.32	79.40	83.22	3.82	0.47
Saskatchewan	80.38	78.14	82.86	4.72	0.29	80.67	0.19	80.86	78.71	83.23	4.52	0.48
Newfoundland and Labrador	80.27	78.38	82.17	3.79	0.29	80.56	0.19	80.75	78.95	82.54	3.59	0.48
Manitoba	80.26	78.18	82.42	4.24	0.29	80.55	0.19	80.74	78.75	82.79	4.04	0.48

Data source: Global Data Lab

== Probability of dying, 2017–2019 ==
The probability of dying is a statistical indicator that shows the proportion of people who die at a given age to those who have reached that age. Strictly speaking, this is not a probability, but a frequency of deaths.

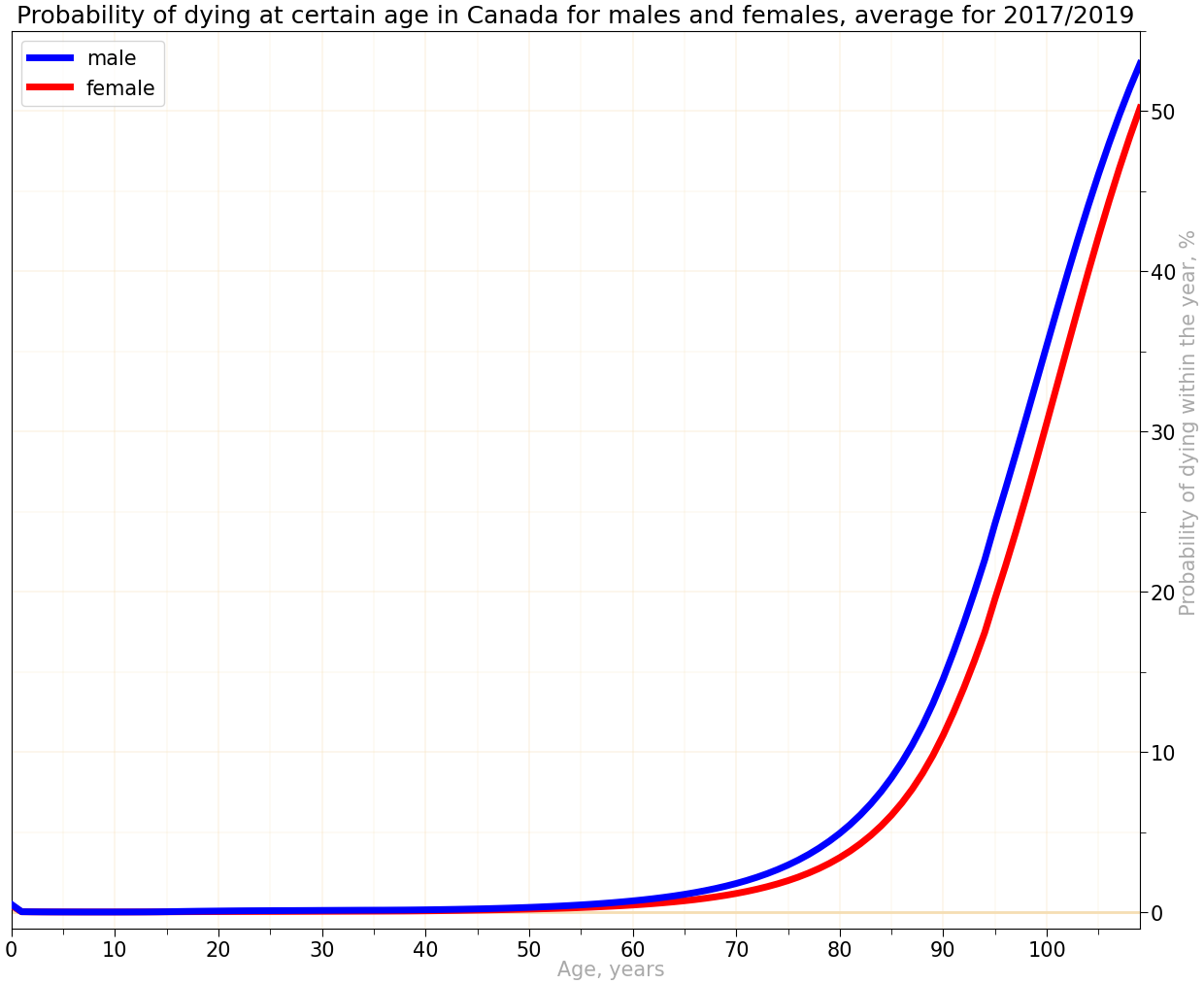
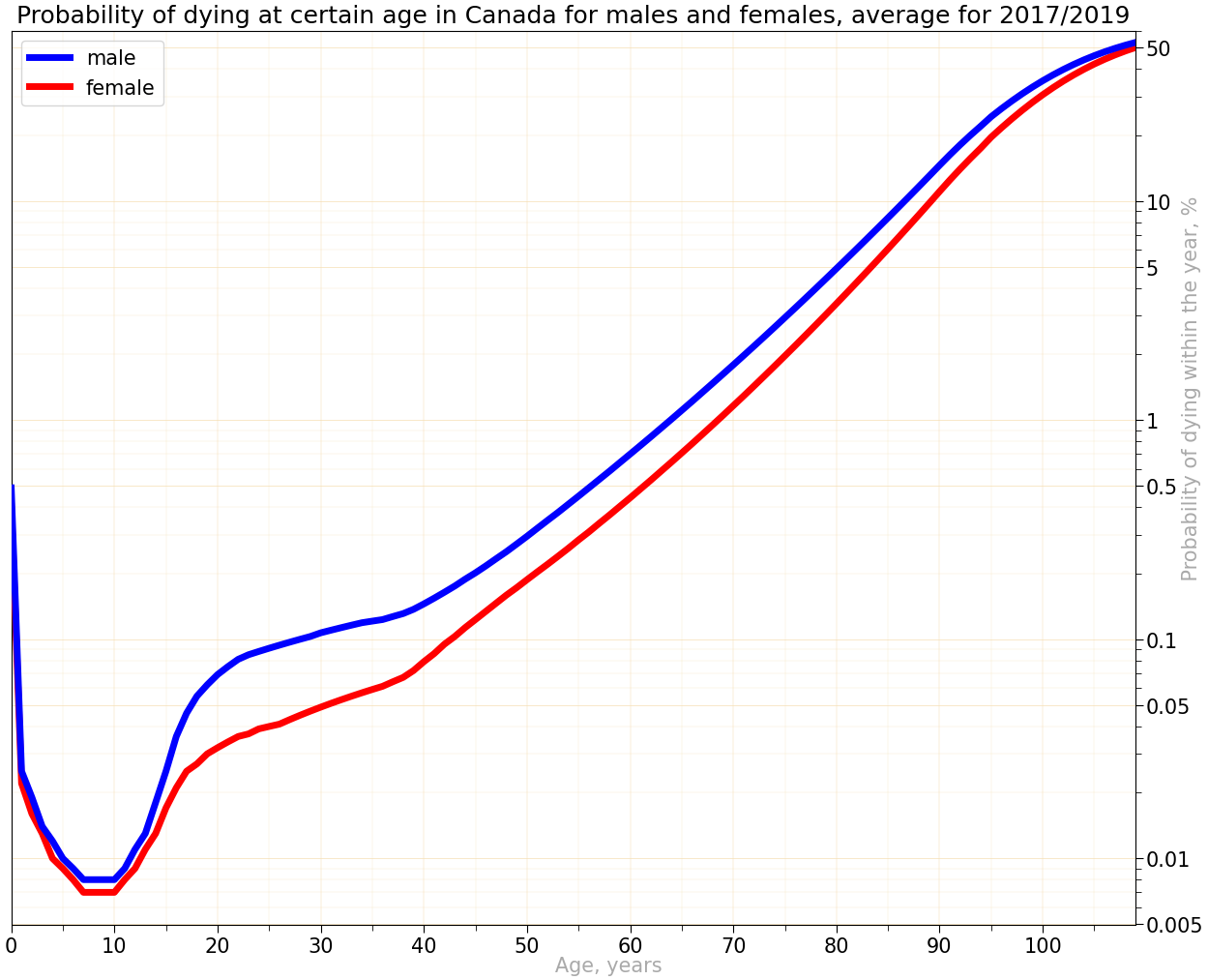
According chart of the probability of dying in Canada for male and female. The chart is made in two versions: using linear and logarithmic scales.
By the age of 109, the probability of dying reaches 53% for male and 50% for female. The probability of dying between ages of 40 and 90 doubles every 7.4 years for male and 7.1 years for female.

Age	Canada on average			Ontario			Quebec			British Columbia		
Age	Probability of dying, %		M / F	Probability of dying, %		M / F	Probability of dying, %		M / F	Probability of dying, %		M / F
Age	male	female	M / F	male	female	M / F	male	female	M / F	male	female	M / F
0	0.491	0.414	1.19	0.475	0.435	1.09	0.466	0.352	1.32	0.362	0.322	1.12
1	0.025	0.022	1.14	0.025	0.020	1.25	0.022	0.014	1.57	0.024	0.014	1.71
5	0.010	0.009	1.11	0.009	0.008	1.12	0.007	0.008	0.87	0.007	0.012	0.58
10	0.008	0.007	1.14	0.007	0.007	1.00	0.008	0.005	1.60	0.006	0.006	1.00
15	0.025	0.017	1.47	0.022	0.013	1.69	0.021	0.010	2.10	0.025	0.017	1.47
20	0.069	0.032	2.16	0.056	0.028	2.00	0.056	0.020	2.80	0.077	0.036	2.14
25	0.091	0.040	2.28	0.079	0.036	2.19	0.060	0.026	2.31	0.121	0.043	2.81
30	0.107	0.049	2.18	0.098	0.046	2.13	0.064	0.029	2.21	0.146	0.054	2.70
35	0.121	0.059	2.05	0.112	0.057	1.96	0.077	0.037	2.08	0.160	0.066	2.42
40	0.145	0.079	1.84	0.138	0.074	1.86	0.100	0.061	1.64	0.186	0.086	2.16
45	0.201	0.123	1.63	0.194	0.115	1.69	0.156	0.105	1.49	0.239	0.125	1.91
50	0.295	0.187	1.58	0.287	0.176	1.63	0.246	0.170	1.45	0.328	0.180	1.82
55	0.450	0.284	1.58	0.438	0.268	1.63	0.394	0.269	1.46	0.470	0.263	1.79
60	0.700	0.442	1.58	0.680	0.420	1.62	0.638	0.436	1.46	0.695	0.399	1.74
65	1.108	0.708	1.56	1.078	0.676	1.59	1.047	0.716	1.46	1.060	0.628	1.69
70	1.787	1.164	1.54	1.740	1.116	1.56	1.736	1.198	1.45	1.666	1.027	1.62
75	2.937	1.964	1.50	2.861	1.892	1.51	2.913	2.040	1.43	2.700	1.746	1.55
80	4.916	3.402	1.45	4.793	3.291	1.46	4.944	3.531	1.40	4.513	3.084	1.46
85	8.382	6.052	1.38	8.182	5.878	1.39	8.487	6.219	1.36	7.778	5.661	1.37
90	14.562	11.054	1.32	14.230	10.774	1.32	14.736	11.142	1.32	13.823	10.796	1.28
95	24.254	19.558	1.24	24.089	19.357	1.24	24.200	19.591	1.24	23.452	19.439	1.21
100	35.376	30.544	1.16	35.408	30.527	1.16	35.156	30.428	1.16	34.675	30.764	1.13
105	46.060	42.178	1.09	46.266	42.370	1.09	45.730	41.921	1.09	45.601	42.719	1.07
109	52.937	50.176	1.06	53.204	50.463	1.05	52.598	49.876	1.05	52.675	50.820	1.04

Data source: Statistics Canada.

== Percentage surviving in 2019 ==
The percentage surviving, is the percent of the population that would survive to certain age, if their life conditions in a given year, were extrapolated to their whole life.

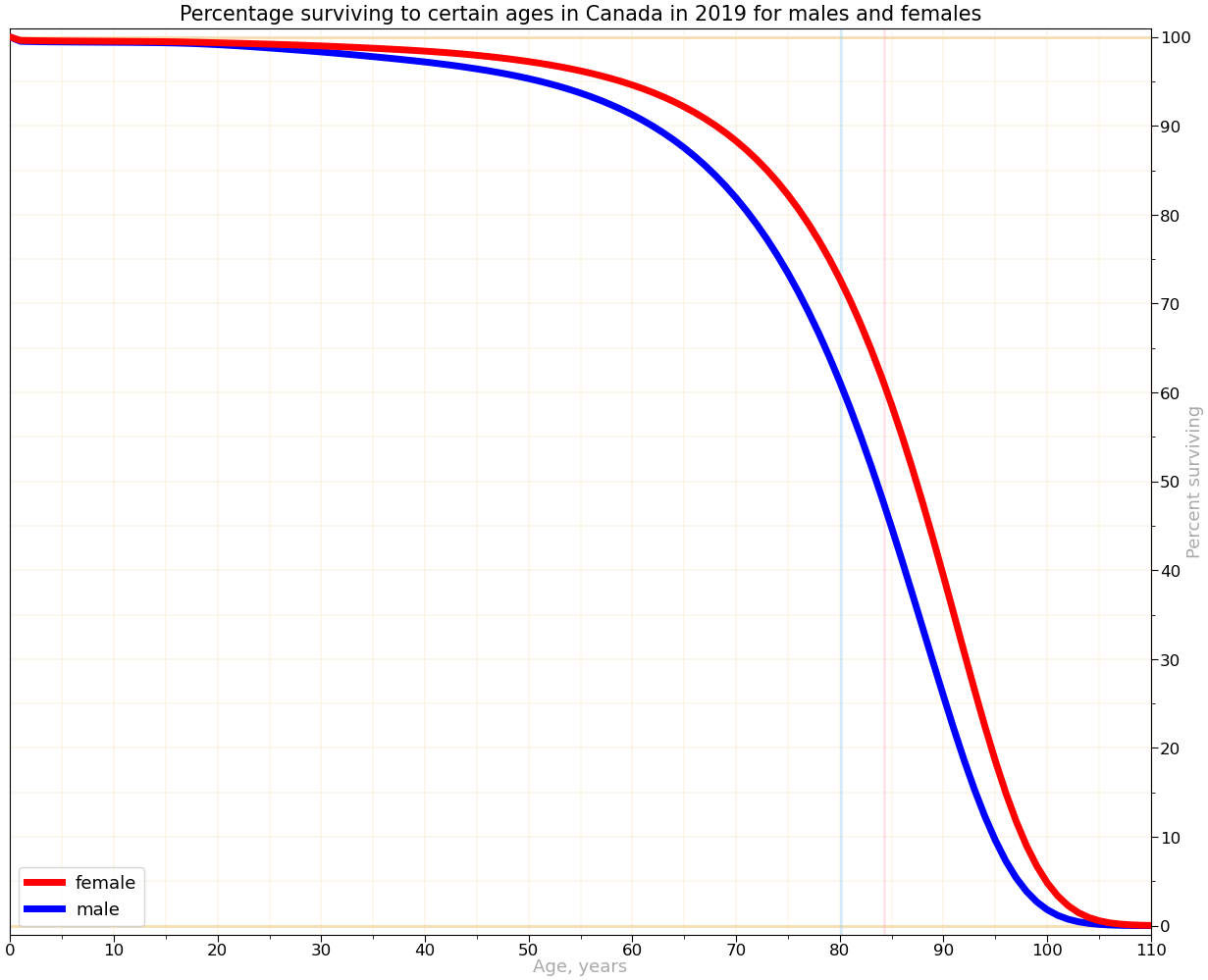
The percent of Canadian people surviving to certain ages by gender, 2019

Age	Canada on average			Ontario			Quebec			British Columbia		
Age	Percentage surviving		F / M	Percentage surviving		F / M	Percentage surviving		F / M	Percentage surviving		F / M
Age	male	female	F / M	male	female	F / M	male	female	F / M	male	female	F / M
1	99.5	99.6	1.00	99.5	99.6	1.00	99.5	99.7	1.00	99.6	99.7	1.00
5	99.4	99.6	1.00	99.5	99.5	1.00	99.4	99.6	1.00	99.6	99.7	1.00
10	99.4	99.5	1.00	99.4	99.5	1.00	99.4	99.6	1.00	99.5	99.6	1.00
15	99.3	99.5	1.00	99.4	99.5	1.00	99.4	99.6	1.00	99.5	99.6	1.00
20	99.1	99.3	1.00	99.2	99.4	1.00	99.2	99.5	1.00	99.3	99.4	1.00
25	98.8	99.2	1.00	98.9	99.2	1.00	98.9	99.4	1.00	98.9	99.3	1.00
30	98.3	99.0	1.01	98.5	99.0	1.01	98.6	99.3	1.01	98.4	99.1	1.01
35	97.8	98.7	1.01	98.0	98.8	1.01	98.3	99.1	1.01	97.7	98.8	1.01
40	97.2	98.4	1.01	97.4	98.4	1.01	97.9	98.9	1.01	97.0	98.4	1.01
45	96.4	97.9	1.02	96.6	98.0	1.01	97.4	98.6	1.01	96.2	97.9	1.02
50	95.3	97.2	1.02	95.5	97.3	1.02	96.5	97.9	1.01	95.0	97.2	1.02
55	93.7	96.2	1.03	93.9	96.3	1.03	95.1	97.0	1.02	93.3	96.2	1.03
60	91.2	94.6	1.04	91.5	94.8	1.04	92.9	95.4	1.03	90.8	94.7	1.04
65	87.5	92.1	1.05	87.8	92.5	1.05	89.4	93.0	1.04	87.3	92.5	1.06
70	81.9	88.3	1.08	82.3	88.8	1.08	83.9	89.1	1.06	82.1	89.1	1.09
75	73.4	82.2	1.12	73.9	83.0	1.12	75.4	82.9	1.10	74.3	83.7	1.13
80	61.2	72.8	1.19	61.8	73.8	1.19	63.0	73.3	1.16	63.0	75.0	1.19
85	44.8	58.6	1.31	45.6	59.9	1.31	46.0	58.8	1.28	47.4	61.5	1.30
90	25.8	39.3	1.52	26.6	40.7	1.53	26.3	39.3	1.49	28.5	42.0	1.48
95	9.6	18.5	1.93	10.2	19.5	1.92	9.6	18.5	1.92	11.1	19.8	1.78
100	1.796	4.828	2.69	1.900	5.090	2.68	1.802	4.874	2.70	2.216	5.155	2.33
105	0.143	0.556	3.89	0.149	0.573	3.85	0.144	0.577	4.01	0.188	0.577	3.07
110	0.005	0.025	5.00	0.005	0.025	5.00	0.005	0.027	5.40	0.006	0.025	4.17

Data source: Statistics Canada.

== See also ==
- List of North American countries by life expectancy
- List of Canadian provinces and territories by GDP
- List of Canadian provinces and territories by Human Development Index
- List of governments in Canada by annual expenditures
- List of Canadian provincial and territorial name etymologies
- Population of Canada by province and territory
