= Nutritional science =

Study of food substances in relation to life processes

Nutritional science (also nutrition science, sometimes short nutrition, dated trophology) is the science that studies the physiological process of nutrition (primarily human nutrition), interpreting the nutrients and other substances in food in relation to maintenance, growth, reproduction, health and disease of an organism.

== History ==
Before nutritional science emerged as an independent study disciplines, mainly chemists worked in this area. The chemical composition of food was examined. Macronutrients, especially protein, fat and carbohydrates, have been the focus components of the study of (human) nutrition since the 19th century. Until the discovery of vitamins and vital substances, the quality of nutrition was measured exclusively by the intake of nutritional energy.

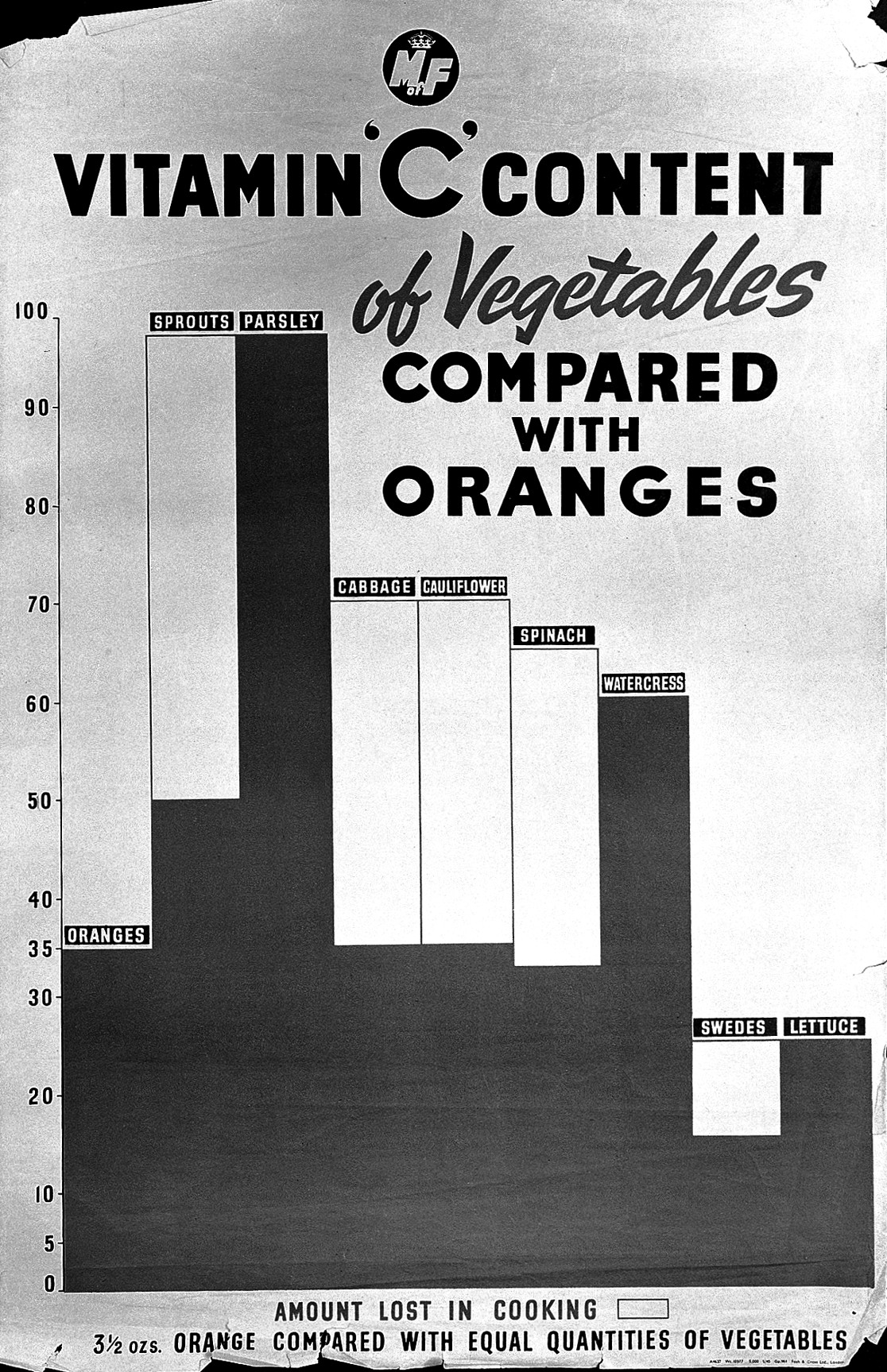
A 1940s lithograph produced by the UK Ministry of Food illustrating the Vitamin C content of various foods

The early years of the 20th century were summarized by Kenneth John Carpenter in his Short History of Nutritional Science as "the vitamin era". The first vitamin was isolated and chemically defined in 1926 (thiamine). The isolation of vitamin C followed in 1932 and its effects on health, the protection against scurvy, was scientifically documented for the first time.

At the instigation of the British physiologist John Yudkin at the University of London, the degrees Bachelor of Science and Master of Science in nutritional science were established in the 1950s.

Nutritional science as a separate discipline was institutionalized in Germany in November 1956 when Hans-Diedrich Cremer was appointed to the chair for human nutrition in Giessen. The Institute for Nutritional Science was initially located at the Academy for Medical Research and Further Education, which was transferred to the Faculty of Human Medicine when the Justus Liebig University was reopened. Over time, seven other universities with similar institutions followed in Germany.

From the 1950s to 1970s, a focus of nutritional science was on dietary fat and sugar. From the 1970s to the 1990s, attention was put on diet-related chronic diseases and supplementation.

== Distinction ==
Nutritional science is often combined with food science (nutrition and food science).

Trophology is a term used globally for nutritional science in other languages, in English the term is dated. Today, it is partly still used for the approach of food combining that advocates specific combinations (or advises against certain combinations) of food. Ecotrophology is a branch of nutritional science concerned with everyday practice and elements from household management that is primarily studied in Germany.

== Academic studies and education ==
Nutritional science as a subject is taught at universities around the world. At the beginning of the programs, the basic subjects of biology, chemistry, mathematics and physics are part of the curriculum. Later, a focus is on inorganic chemistry, functional biology, biochemistry and genetics. At most universities, students can specialize in certain areas, this involves subjects such as special food chemistry, nutritional physiology, nutritional epidemiology, food law and nutritional medicine. Students who are more interested in the economic aspect usually specialize in the field of food economics. Laboratory exercises are also on the curriculum at most universities.

== Notable nutritional scientists ==
- John Yudkin (1910–1995), who established the first degree in nutritional science in any European university
- Hans Adalbert Schweigart (1900–1972), the creator of the term vital substances
- Hans Konrad Biesalski (* 1949)
- Hanni Rützler (* 1962)

== Scientific journals ==
- Nutrition
- Journal of Nutritional Science, published on behalf of The Nutrition Society
- Journal of Nutritional Science and Vitaminology, edited by The Vitamin Society of Japan and Japan Society of Nutrition and Food Science, published by the Center for Academic Publications Japan
- Food & Nutrition Research, published by the Swedish Nutrition Foundation
- European Journal of Nutrition, published by Springer Science+Business Media in Germany
- Journal of the Academy of Nutrition and Dietetics
