= Science of underwater diving =

Scientific concepts that are closely associated with underwater diving

The science of underwater diving includes those concepts which are useful for understanding the underwater environment in which diving takes place, and its influence on the diver. It includes aspects of physics, physiology and oceanography. The practice of scientific work while diving is known as Scientific diving. These topics are covered to a greater or lesser extent in diver training programs, on the principle that understanding the concepts may allow the diver to avoid problems and deal with them more effectively when they cannot be avoided.

A basic understanding of the physics of the underwater environment is foundational to the understanding of the short and long term physiological effects on the diver, and the associated hazards of the diving environment and their consequences which are inherent to diving.

== Physics ==
Diving physics are the aspects of physics which directly affect the underwater diver and explain the effects that divers and their equipment are subject to underwater which differ from the normal human experience out of water.

These effects are mostly consequences of immersion in water; buoyancy, the hydrostatic pressure of depth, the effects of the pressure on breathing gases and gas spaces in the diver and equipment, the inertial and viscous effects on diver movement, and the heat transfer effects. Other effects are the physical influences of the underwater environment on human sensory perception. An understanding of the physics are useful when considering the physiological effects of diving, the hazards and risks of diving, the working of underwater breathing apparatus, buoyancy control and buoyant lifting.

Other foundational knowledge of physics for diving includes the properties of gases and breathing gas mixtures under variations of absolute pressure and temperature, and the solubility of gases in fluids.

== Physiology ==
The human physiology of underwater diving is the physiological influences of the underwater environment on human divers, and adaptations to operating underwater, both during breath-hold dives and while breathing at ambient pressure from a suitable breathing gas supply. It, therefore, includes both the physiology of breath-hold diving in humans, and the range of physiological effects generally limited to human ambient pressure divers either freediving or using underwater breathing apparatus. Several factors affect the diver, including immersion, exposure to the water, the limitations of breath-hold endurance, variations in ambient pressure, the effects of breathing gases at raised ambient pressure, effects caused by the use of breathing apparatus, and sensory impairment. All of these may affect diver performance and safety.

Immersion affects fluid balance, circulation and work of breathing. Exposure to cold water can result in the harmful cold shock response, the helpful diving reflex and excessive loss of body heat. Breath-hold duration is limited by oxygen reserves, and the risk of hypoxic blackout, which has a high associated risk of drowning.

Large or sudden changes in ambient pressure have the potential for injury known as barotrauma. Breathing under pressure involves several effects. Metabolically inactive gases are absorbed by the tissues and may have narcotic or other undesirable effects, and must be released slowly to avoid the formation of bubbles during decompression. Metabolically active gases have a greater effect in proportion to their concentration, which is proportional to their partial pressure, which for contaminants is increased in proportion to absolute ambient pressure.

Work of breathing is increased by increased density of the breathing gas, artifacts of the breathing apparatus, and hydrostatic pressure variations due to posture in the water. High work of breathing and large combinations of physiological and mechanical dead space can lead to hypercapnia, which may induce a panic response.

The underwater environment also affects sensory input, which can impact on safety and the ability to function effectively at depth.

Other physiological effects become apparent at greater depths and where alternative breathing gas mixtures are used to mitigate some of these effects. Nitrogen narcosis occurs under high partial pressures of nitrogen, and helium is substituted to avoid or reduce this effect. High pressure nervous syndrome affects divers breathing helium mixes during rapid compression to high pressures, Compression arthralgia can also affect divers during rapid compression to high pressures. Long decompression times can be reduced by higher oxygen content of breathing gas, but this can expose the diver to oxygen toxicity effects, and changing from helium to nitrogen diluted gases during decompression can cause isobaric counterdiffusion problems. Toxicity of breathing gas contaminants is proportional to partial pressure, and a gas which may have no effect at the surface can be dangerously toxic at higher ambient pressure.

Hypoxia of ascent can affect freedivers and rebreather divers, and in occasional circumstances scuba and surface-supplied divers, and can be a killer, as the diver can lose consciousness without warning and consequently drown or asphyxiate.

== Environment ==
The ocean and aquatic environment is described by oceanography and limnology. These are directly influenced by aspects of geology, weather and climate. The underwater environment is inhabited by organisms of great diversity, some of which may be hazardous to the diver, or affect the dive in some way.

Sufficient knowledge and a basic understanding of the expected environment for an intended dive allow the diver to predict the conditions which may reasonably be expected during the dive, and allow reasonable estimation of hazards and associated risk, which allows effective dive planning. There are a range of environmental hazards which should be considered during dive planning.

The other side of understanding of the environment by divers is the impact of diving activity on the environment. The environmental impact of recreational diving on the popular tropical coral reef environment has been extensively studied, and there are known adverse effects due to poor diving skills and lack of environmental awareness, which can be addressed by training and education. While commercial diving operations can also have significant environmental impact, they are less frequent, and where environmental impact is expected to be an issue it should be considered in the environmental impact study for the specific contract or project. Similarly, scientific diving environmental impact should be estimated during planning, and be subject to acceptance by the relevant ethics committee.

A basic understanding of the practical relevance of some environmental factors that influence diving operations is useful, such as:

- Algal bloom – Spread of planktonic algae in water
- Current (stream) – Flow of water in a natural watercourse due to gravity
  - Longshore drift – Sediment moved by the longshore current
  - Ocean current – Directional mass flow of oceanic water
  - Rip current – Water current moving away from shore
  - Tidal race – Fast-moving tidal flow
  - Undertow (water waves) – Return flow below nearshore water waves
  - Upwelling – Oceanographic phenomenon of wind-driven motion of ocean water
    - Ekman transport – Net transport of surface water perpendicular to wind direction
- Halocline – Stratification of a body of water due to salinity differences
- Reef – Submerged ridge of rock, coral or other material
  - Coral reef – Outcrop of rock in the sea formed by the growth and deposit of stony coral skeletons
- Stratification (water) – Layering of a body of water due to density variations
- Thermocline – Distinct layer of temperature change in a body of water
- Tide – Change in sea level due to gravity
- Turbidity – Cloudiness of a fluid
- Wind wave – Surface waves generated by wind on open water
  - Breaking wave, also known as Surf – Unstable wave
  - Surge (wave action) – The component of wave motion close to and parallel with the bottom
  - Swell (ocean) – Series of waves generated by distant weather systems
  - Wave shoaling – Effect by which surface waves entering shallower water change in wave height
