= Rewarming shock =

Rewarming shock (also known as rewarming collapse) has been described as a drop in blood pressure following the warming of a person who is very cold. The real cause of this rewarming shock is unknown.

There was a theoretical concern that external rewarming rather than internal rewarming may increase the risk. These concerns were partly believed to be due to afterdrop, a situation detected during laboratory experiments where there is a continued decrease in core temperature after rewarming has been started. Recent studies have not supported these concerns, and problems are not found with active external rewarming.

== Clinical features ==
Patients show signs of respiratory and cardiovascular compromise due to a mismatch between oxygen supply and demand. Specific signs and symptoms include:

- Hypotension
- Bradycardia
- Heart failure
- Respiratory compromise
- Acidosis

Overall, the patient is unable to regulate their body temperature resulting in a distributive shock.

== Pathophysiology ==
There is no consensus for the mechanism. In essence, rewarming shock is a failure of the body to hemodynamically and metabolically meet the needs to maintain homeostasis. Proposed mechanisms are detailed below.

=== Vasodilation and Venous Pooling ===
The process of active rewarming at a fast pace forces the body compensate by dilating its blood vessels. At a fast rate of expansion, it causes pooling in the extremities therefore releasing vast amounts of heat.

=== Heart failure ===
Since the cardiovascular system is already weak due to hypothermia, the rapid dilation of blood vessels results in a significant decrease in cardiac output. This leads to a sudden decrease in blood pressure and a state of shock.

=== Metabolic demand ===
At a hypothermic baseline, the cells metabolic needs are lowered yet they are still deprived from oxygen and nutrients. As the rewarming process begins, the cells start increasing its metabolic needs further causing an increase in oxygen demand. Because the cardiovascular system is already weakened, it cannot keep up with the demand of the cells.

== Management and treatment ==
The goal of managing rewarming shock is to increase the core body temperature, maintain cardiac output and blood pressure through hemodynamic support. Fluid therapy and electrolyte replacement are an important part of treatment since patients with prolonged exposure may experience cold diuresis.

=== Prehospital interventions ===
On initial assessment of the patient, it is important to move the patient as little as possible. Doing so could result in a phenomenon called 'afterdrop' where the toxic metabolites from the extremities travel back to the heart causing arrhythmias. Limit the patient to staying still for at least 30 minutes. Remove any wet clothes and apply external heat packs to the trunk of the patient to mitigate any peripheral vasodilation. Some external heat sources include chemical pads, heated blankets, etc.

=== Fluid resuscitation ===
It is important to keep patients hydrated as hypothermic patients suffer from cold diuresis where the body attempts to maintain core body temperature by urinating resulting in dehydration. To counteract this, warmed intravenous solution is given in boluses. It is recommended to warm IV fluids to 41-42 degrees celsius. Also consider potassium shifts as potassium shifts from extracellular to intracellular when core body temperature drops. It is recommended to wait until the body temperature is 35 degrees celsius as treating prematurely will cause hyperkalemia.

=== Active internal rewarming ===
For moderate to severe hypothermia, more invasive measures are used to further prevent cardiovascular collapse and peripheral vasodilation. One of the measures is providing humidifed oxygen at 41-42 degrees celsius. Patients can also undergo body cavity lavage where warm fluid is circulated into different cavities of the body such as bladder, gastric, or pleural. Peritoneal dialysis at 44 degrees celsius at a rate of 4-6 degrees celsius per hour is highly recommended if the modality is available for treatment.
