= Oculocardiac reflex =

Pulse rate connected with eye muscles

The oculocardiac reflex, also known as Aschner phenomenon, Aschner reflex, or Aschner–Dagnini reflex, is a decrease in pulse rate associated with traction applied to extraocular muscles and/or compression of the eyeball. It is part of a broader family of reflexes known collectively as the trigeminocardiac reflex.

== Prevalence ==
This reflex is especially sensitive in neonates and children, particularly during strabismus correction surgery. Oculocardiac reflex can be profound during eye examination for retinopathy of prematurity. However, this reflex may also occur with adults. Bradycardia, junctional rhythm and asystole, all of which may be life-threatening, can be induced through this reflex. This reflex has been seen to occur during many panfacial trauma surgeries due to stimulation of any of the three branches of trigeminal nerve.

== Neurophysiology ==
The reflex is mediated by nerve connections between the ophthalmic branch of the trigeminal cranial nerve via the ciliary ganglion, and the vagus nerve of the parasympathetic nervous system. Nerve fibres from the maxillary and mandibular divisions of the trigeminal nerve have also been documented. These afferents synapse with the visceral motor nucleus of the vagus nerve, located in the reticular formation of the brain stem. The efferent portion is carried by the vagus nerve from the cardiovascular center of the medulla to the heart, of which increased stimulation leads to decreased output of the sinoatrial node.

== Treatment ==
The reflex can be blocked by intravenous injection of an anti-muscarinic acetylcholine (ACh) antagonist, such as atropine or glycopyrrolate. If bradycardia does occur, removal of the stimulus is immediately indicated. This often results in the restoration of normal sinus rhythm of the heart. If not, the use of atropine or glycopyrrolate will usually be successful and permit continuation of the surgical procedure. Caution should be used with fast-push, intravenous opioids and dexmedetomidine which exacerbate the bradycardia. In extreme cases, such as asystole, cardiopulmonary resuscitation may be required.

== In psychology ==
A commonly used technique in the field of brainspotting called "vergence" deliberately triggers this reflex in order to calm patients.

== See also ==
- Carotid sinus massage
- Vagal maneuver
