= Edmund Goodwyn =

English physician (1756–1829)

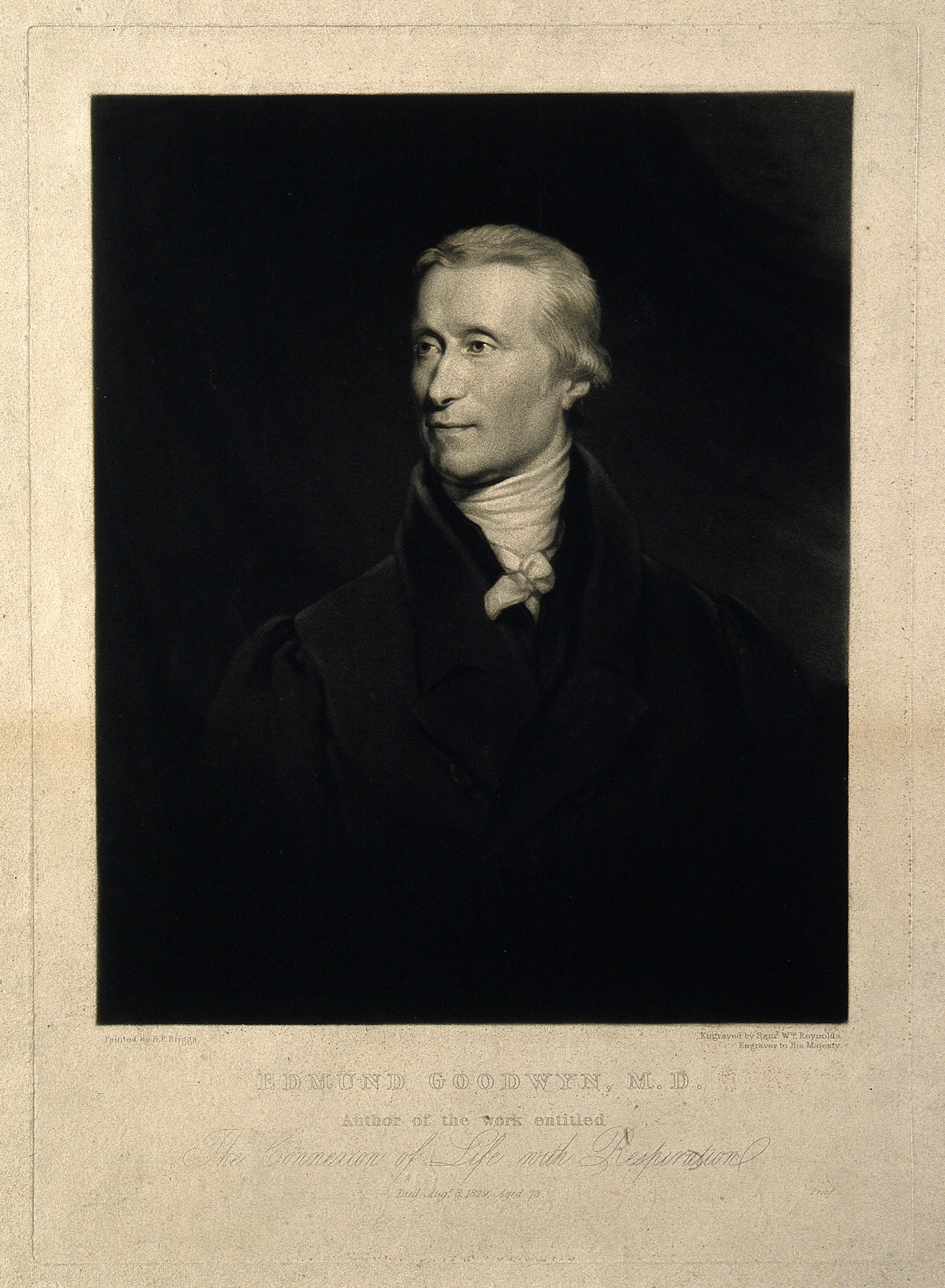
Edmund Goodwyn (1756–1829)

Edmund Goodwyn, M.D. (1756–1829) was an English physician whose medical school graduation thesis contains several important contributions, including the discovery of the diving reflex. He advanced early important arguments in favor of artificial ventilation for the treatment of asphyxia over alternative resuscitation measures of the time, like heat and exsanguination. In addition, Goodwyn was the first to refute claims that pulmonary circulation stopped during exhalation.

== Life ==
Edmund Goodwyn belonged to a yeoman family that settled in Framlingham, United Kingdom, at the beginning of the seventeenth century. He was baptized there on 2 December 1756, only a few months before the death of his young father. He began his medical career by completing a six year apprenticeship with John Page (1730–1794), a surgeon from the neighboring town of Woodbridge. As a medical student at the University of Edinburgh between 1779 and 1786, Goodwyn was influenced by medical luminaries like William Cullen (1710–1790), Joseph Black (1728–1799), and Alexander Monro Secundus (1733–1817). He befriended Thomas Beddoes (1760–1808), a fellow medical student who dedicated his book of John Mayow’s (1640–1679) work on air and respiration to Goodwyn. Goodwyn dedicated his own work on the physiological aspects of drowning to his medical school friend Johannes Theodorus Van der Kemp (1747–1811) who ironically would later watch his wife and daughter drown as his boat capsized during a thunderstorm. Goodwyn also dedicated the English translation of his thesis to John Page.

A few lines of Memoirs of Chateaubriand Vol II suggest that Goodwyn practiced medicine in London, where Francois-Rene de Chateaubriand (1768–1848) sought his expertise for a pulmonary malady. Chateaubriand wrote: “Dr. Goodwyn, famous for his experiments on drowning people…assisted me with his advice gratis. But he said to me, with the harshness that he employed towards himself, that I might ‘last’ a few months, perhaps one or two years, provided I gave up all fatigue.” In a footnote, Chateaubriand suggests that Goodwyn was “the original of William Makepeace Thackeray’s (1811–1863) [legendary character] Dr. Goodenough.”

Goodwyn died in Framlingham in 1829. An inscription on the nave of the Framlingham church above his remains reads: “…Powerful as was his intellect, and various as were his attainments, he was even more distinguished by his benevolent simplicity of heart and unaffected piety.” His portrait is archived at the National Portrait Gallery in London.

== Works ==
During the interim between the mid 1700s and the early 1900s many physicians lost confidence in their ability to pronounce death. This phenomenon was in part sparked by Jacques-Bénigne Winslow’s (1669–1760) The Uncertainty of the Signs of Death and the Danger of Precipitate Interments and Dissections, published in 1740, which claimed the existence of death-like state often referred to as “suspended animation.” In addition, it argued that victims to these conditions should not be pronounced dead, nor buried, until their bodies demonstrated overt putrefaction. Goodwyn's graduation thesis vehemently refutes these concepts.

His experimental work aimed to identify the physiological hallmark of drowning, which he accomplished by removing the sternum from cats, dogs, rabbits, toads, and lizards in order to observe the changes in blood color inside the pulmonary arteries and veins during conditions of asphyxia. He confirmed previous reports that the chemical process that turned “black” blood (i.e., deoxygenated blood) into “florid” blood (i.e., oxygenated blood) was halted by different causes of asphyxia, and was the first to observe that this anomaly occurred consistently during drowning, even if only a very small amount of water entered the lungs. Thus he was the first to conclude that water did not cause drowning directly by damaging the lungs, but indirectly, by excluding atmospheric air from them. In some experiments Goodwyn even used a blow pipe to ventilate the lungs of lifeless, experimentally drowned, toads and lizards, inducing their "black" pulmonary blood to become florid, and their hearts to resume beating. Based on these results he wrote: “… it appears, that there is a striking impropriety in the terms, which are commonly employed… viz. ‘suspended animation,’… because they lead mankind to believe themselves capable of reanimating or resuscitating a lifeless mass, when they only cure a disease.” Unfortunately, despite Goodwyn’s early admonition, suspended animation and its mystical implications persisted well into the early 1900s.

Thus Goodwyn provided experimental evidence to support the use of artificial ventilation over alternative resuscitation methods of the time, which included heat, electricity, exsanguination, tobacco smoke, and the application of various vapors and creams to the skin and intestines. He based his arguments on actual comparisons between the efficacy of such methods and that of artificial ventilation. He wrote:“…if we allow to these remedies all the efficacy that partiality can claim, it can only be said, that they sometimes produce by indirect means, what may be always done directly by [artificial lung inflation] …” In addition, Goodwyn disproved the notion that pulmonary blood flow slowed to a halt during the exhalation phase of respiration by demonstrating that the volume of air expired during a normal respiratory cycle was too small to reshape the lungs to a degree that impedes blood flow. Goodwyn wrote: “To suppose… that the angles of these vessels are changed although the form of the lungs continues the same is contrary to one of the fundamental principles of geometry.” He concluded: “…blood circulates through the pulmonary vessels in all the degrees of natural respiration.” His work was acknowledged by the eminent French anatomist Xavier Bichat (1771–1802) in his book Recherches physiologiques sur la vie et la mort.

Goodwyn's work earned a gold medal from the Royal Humane Society of London in 1788. His discovery of the diving reflex was erroneously attributed to Paul Bert (1833–1886) for nearly one-hundred fifty years before it was finally credited to him.
