= Cold shock response =

Physiological response to sudden exposure to cold

Cold shock response is a series of neurogenic cardio-respiratory responses caused by sudden immersion in cold water. In cold water immersions, such as by falling through thin ice, cold shock response is perhaps the most common cause of death. Also, the abrupt contact with very cold water may cause involuntary inhalation, which, if underwater, can result in fatal drowning.

Death which occurs in such scenarios is complex to investigate, and there are several possible causes and phenomena involved. The cold water can cause heart attack due to severe vasoconstriction, where the heart has to work harder to pump the same volume of blood throughout the arteries. For people with pre-existing cardiovascular disease, the additional workload can result in myocardial infarction or acute heart failure, which ultimately may lead to a cardiac arrest. A vagal response to an extreme stimulus may, in very rare cases, render per se a cardiac arrest. Hypothermia and extreme stress can both precipitate fatal tachyarrhythmias. A more modern view suggests that an autonomic conflict – sympathetic (due to stress) and parasympathetic (due to the diving reflex) coactivation – may be responsible for some cold water immersion deaths. Gasp reflex and uncontrollable tachypnea can severely increase the risk of water inhalation and drowning, as the ability to hold one's breath decreases from the normal 60-90 seconds to just a few seconds at a water temperature lower than ~15 °C (59 °F).

Some people are much better prepared to survive sudden exposure to very cold water because of bodily and mental characteristics and conditioning. In fact, cold water swimming (also known as ice swimming or winter swimming) is a sport and an activity that reportedly has several health benefits when done regularly.

== Physiological response ==
=== Cold water immersion syndrome – four-stage model ===
The physiological response to a sudden immersion in cold water may be divided in three or four discrete stages, with different risks and physiological changes, all being part of an entity labelled as Cold Water Immersion Syndrome. Although this process is a continuum, the 4 phases were initially described in the 1980s as follows:

Phase	Time	Physiological Changes
Initial (cold shock)	First 2–3 minutes	Cooling of the skin, hyperventilation, tachycardia, gasp reflex
Short-term	After 3 minutes	Superficial neuromuscular cooling
Long-term	After 30 min	Hypothermia, later collapse
Circum-rescue collapse (afterdrop)	Immediately before, during or after rescue	Cardiac arrhythmia, hemostasis, unconsciousness

Water cools much more efficiently than air, and can lead to drastic surface temperature drops, which trigger the initial cold shock response, which typically lasts less than 5 minutes. This initial response will be proportional to how fast the skin is cooling. The goal appears to be heat-retention, so the peripheral blood vessels constrict. Breathing is also affected, with gasping, an increased respiratory rate, and reduced ability to hold one's breath. The magnitude of the cold shock response parallels the cutaneous cooling rate, The end of the initial response is likely due to "reflex baroreceptor responses or thermoreceptor habituation".

=== Diving reflex ===
Several automatic responses, which are understood to help conserve oxygen, occur when a diving mammal is submersed. They are collectively termed the Diving reflex. Responses include an increase in heart and breathing rates, bloodflow reduction to the spleen and peripheral vessels, and hormone release from the adrenal glands.

=== Cardiac arrhythmias and autonomic conflict ===
Early models of cold water immersion syndrome focused primarily on sympathetic responses, but recent research suggests sympathetic and parasympathetic co-activation (leading to a conflict of the autonomic system response) may be responsible for some cold water immersion deaths. Although reciprocal activation between sympathetic (cold shock) and parasympathetic (diving response) systems is commonly adaptive (follow one another), simultaneous activation appears to be associated with arrhythmia. Cold water induced rhythm disturbances are common, albeit frequently asymptomatic. In most humans, head-out cold-water immersion results in sympathetically driven tachycardia with variable disturbances. These cold water immersion induced arrhythmias appear to be accentuated by parasympathetic stimulation resulting from facial submersion or breath holding. Even vagally dominant diving bradycardia caused by isolated cold water facial immersion frequently is interrupted by supraventricular arrhythmias or premature beats. In theory, atrioventricular blockade or sinus arrest due to profound parasympathetic dominance might result in syncope or sudden cardiac death, but these rhythms tend to be rapidly reversed by lung stretch receptor activation associated with breathing. As such, a vagally produced arrest scenario is likelier during entrapment submersion than in flush drowning.

== Conditioning against cold shock ==
It is possible to undergo physiological conditioning to reduce the cold shock response, and some people are naturally better suited to swimming in very cold water. Beneficial adaptations include the following:

1. having an insulating layer of body fat covering the limbs and torso;
2. ability to experience immersion without involuntary physical shock or mental panic;
3. ability to resist shivering;
4. ability to raise metabolism (and, in some cases, increase blood temperature slightly above the normal level);
5. a generalized delaying of metabolic shutdown (including slipping into unconsciousness) as central and peripheral body temperatures fall.

== Cold shock response in other organisms ==
=== Cold shock in mammals ===
Cold shock has been described in several species and at least part of the physiology is similar, as described above in the Diving Reflex.

=== Cold shock in bacteria ===
A cold shock is when bacteria undergo a significant reduction in temperature, likely due to their environment dropping in temperature. To constitute as a cold shock the temperature reduction needs to be both significant, for example dropping from 37 °C to 20 °C, and it needs to happen over a short period of time, traditionally in under 24 hours. Both prokaryotic and eukaryotic cells are capable of undergoing a cold shock response. The effects of a cold shock in bacteria include:

- Decreased cell membrane fluidity
- Decreased enzyme activity
- Decreased efficiency of transcription and translation
- Decreased efficiency of protein folding
- Decreased ribosome function

The bacteria uses the cytoplasmic membrane, RNA/DNA, and ribosomes as cold sensors in the cell, placing them in charge of monitoring the cell's temperature. Once these sensors send the signal that a cold shock is occurring, the bacteria will pause the majority of protein synthesis in order to redirect its focus to producing what are called cold shock proteins (Csp). The volume of the cold shock proteins produced will depend on the severity of the temperature decrease. The function of these cold shock proteins is to assist the cell in adapting to the sudden temperature change, allowing it to maintain as close to a normal level of function as possible.

One way cold shock proteins are thought to function is by acting as nucleic acid chaperones. These cold shock proteins will block the formation of secondary structures in the mRNA during the cold shock, leaving the bacteria with only single strand RNA. Single strand is the most efficient form of RNA for the facilitation of transcription and translation. This will help to counteract the decreased efficiency of transcription and translation brought about by the cold shock. Cold shock proteins also affect the formation of hairpin structures in the RNA, blocking them from being formed. The function of these hairpin structures is to slow down or decrease the transcription of RNA. So by removing them, this will also help to increase the efficiency of transcription and translation.

Once the initial shock of the temperature decrease has been dealt with, the production of cold shock proteins is slowly tapered off. Instead, other proteins are synthesized in their place as the cell continues to grow at this new lower temperature. However, the rate of growth seen by these bacterial cells at colder temperatures is often lower than the rates of growth they exhibit at warmer temperatures.

=== Transcriptional response of Escherichia coli to cold shock ===
Cold shocks cause the repression of several hundreds of genes in the bacterium E. coli. Many of these genes are repressed quickly after the decrease in temperature, while others are only affected several hours after this event. The repression mechanism is described in Dash, et al. Shortly, during cold-shocks, cellular energy levels decrease. This hampers the efficiency by which DNA gyrases remove positive supercoils produced by transcription events, whose accumulation eventually blocks future transcription events.

Many of the genes repressed during cold shock are involved in cell metabolism. By knowing the mechanism by which these genes respond, one can potentially tune it, in genetically modified bacteria, to modify at which temperature is the response to cold shock activated. This modification could reduce the energy costs of bioreactors.

== See also ==
- Diving reflex – Physiological responses to immersion of air-breathing vertebrates
- Hypothermia – Human body core temperature below 35 °C (95 °F)

== Sources ==
- Introduction to Frozen Mythbusters and Myth #1. Wilderness Medicine Newsletter. Sourced 2008-05-17.
