= Trigeminocardiac reflex =

The trigeminocardiac reflex (TCR) consists of a reduction in heart rate associated with a marked decrease in mean arterial pressure following stimulation of the trigeminal nerve.

In recent years, the TCR has emerged as the prototype for a family of physiological reflex reactions—not necessarily pathological—which includes the oculocardiac reflex and the diving reflex. The renewed interest in the TCR and related reflexes is largely due to the research of the Swiss physician Bernard Schaller.

== Characteristics of the reflex ==
The trigemino-cardiac reflex is usually defined as a 20% drop in mean arterial pressure associated with a heart rate lower than 60 beats per minute. Another common consequence of the TCR is apnea, suggesting a close relationship with the diving reflex. However, unlike the diving reflex, the TCR does not cause peripheral vasoconstriction. Gastric hypermotility is another typical consequence of the reflex.

The reflex can be triggered by mechanical, electrical, or chemical stimulation of any of the trigeminal afferent sensory fibers, including proprioceptive ones. Where the reflex is exteroceptive in origin, sensory afferents first reach the trigeminal ganglion before projecting centrally to the brainstem. The spinal trigeminal nucleus, located in the medulla oblongata, serves as the primary relay station for the afferent arc of the reflex. Localized electrical stimulation has shown that the most sensitive sites for eliciting the TCR are located within the dorsal portion of the spinal tract and the pars caudalis of the spinal nucleus.

Neurophysiological evidence suggests the existence of fibers that reach the nucleus ambiguus indirectly from the trigeminal nuclei. This nucleus, situated within the medullary reticular formation, is one of the two neural centers—along with the dorsal motor nucleus of the vagus—that sends inhibitory projections to the heart. Other trigeminal fibers indirectly project to the sympathetic nuclei controlling arterial tone, causing peripheral vasodilation and a subsequent reduction in arterial pressure. This effect appears to occur independently of bradycardia.

== Prevalence ==
The TCR is frequently reported in cranio-maxillofacial surgery, with a prevalence of reflex bradycardia ranging from 1 to 2%. In skull base surgery the prevalence increases significantly, reaching up to 18%. These figures, however, appear modest in comparison to the prevalence of the oculocardiac reflex during strabismus surgery, which is reported to occur in over 32% of cases.

TCR cases are also documented outside surgical settings. Evidence suggests that mandibular stretching can induce the same reductions in heart rate and mean arterial pressure observed in the TCR. A rare case of recurring TCR was reported in 2017 involving an elderly person whose symptoms persisted for several years post-surgery, only improving following the ablation of the trigeminal nerve.

Several predisposing have been identified, ranging from light anesthesia to elevated resting vagal tone. Delayed-onset TCR has also been reported, with bradycardia occurring 48 hours after an intraorbital procedure.

== Health risks ==
The TCR and its related reflexes can pose a serious hazard to patients undergoing medical procedures in the facial region. While the cardiovascular changes induced by the reflex are usually reversible upon cessation of the stimulus, in some cases, arrhythmia, asystole, and even death may occur. Furthermore, a rapid reduction in blood pressure below the lower limit of cerebral autoregulation can lead to central nervous system dysfunction, secondary to reflex-induced hypoperfusion.

Preventive measures in medical practice include local anesthesia of the trigeminal nerve or the prophylactic administration of anticholinergic drugs; however, neither approach eliminates the risks associated with the TCR.

It has been hypothesized that Sudden Infant Death Syndrome may be linked to the induction of the TCR. Conversely, TCR induced via the proprioceptive pathway does not appear to trigger such extreme reactions; however, the body of evidence remains limited.

== Physiological significance ==
The exact physiological significance of the TCR has yet to be defined, though several hypotheses have been put forward:

- Neonatal protection: Some researchers emphasize its importance during the early months of life. During breastfeeding, a newborn's nasal passages may be partially obstructed, leading to hypoventilation.The metabolic changes induced by the reflex could potentially shield the developing brain from hypoxic damage.
- Compensatory Mechanism: The TCR has been proposed as a mechanism to counteract tachycardia induced by nocturnal bruxism.
- Oxygen Conservation: Schaller and colleagues suggested that the TCR serves an oxygen-conserving role, similar to the diving reflex. This is supported by evidence that trigeminal stimulation promotes pial vasodilation and an increase in cerebral blood flow.

== History of the reflex ==
The term 'trigeminocardiac reflex' was coined in 1988 by British authors to encompass the extra-ocular sources of the oculocardiac reflex—specifically, a reduction in heart rate associated with manipulation of the ocular globe.

Starting in the late 1990s, the work of Swiss neurosurgeon Bernard Schaller and his collaborators significantly advanced the understanding of this clinical phenomenon. More recently, Italian neuroscientist Marcello Brunelli identified a proprioceptive mechanism within the TCR family, triggered by mechanical stretching of the jaw. Additionally, concurrent vasodilation of pial arterioles was observed in rat models following mandibular extension.
