= Marcello Brunelli =

Italian neurophysiologist

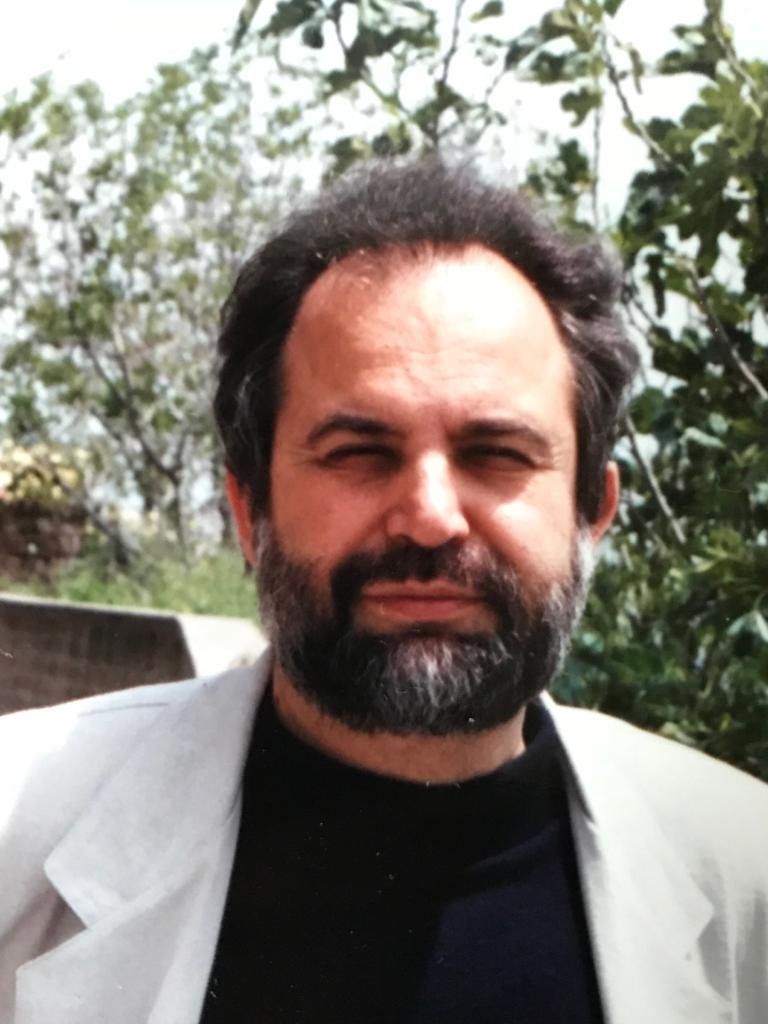
- Born: Marcello Brunelli; 14 April 1939; Ancona, Italy
- Died: 25 November 2020 (aged 81); Pisa, Italy
- Known for: Physiology of learning and memory
- Scientific career
- Fields: Neuroscience
- Institutions: University of Pisa

Marcello Brunelli (14 July 1939 – 25 November 2020) was an Italian neurophysiologist and academic.

He chaired the General Physiology and Neurobiology at the University of Pisa and worked with Giuseppe Moruzzi and Eric Kandel. Together with Kandel, he obtained the first demonstration of the role of the cyclic AMP as a second messenger in the transmission of the nervous impulse.

== Biography ==
In 1967, Brunelli graduated with honors in Medicine and Surgery at the University of Pisa. In the same year, he began his research activity at the CNR Institute of Clinical Physiology and from 1969 to 1970 at the Institute of Neurophysiology, also in Pisa. From 1970 to 1974, he was assistant of Human Physiology at the Pisa Physiology Institute. Together with Franco Magni he published researches on the nervous system of the pigeon and the leech and on the hormonal mechanisms of light emission in fireflies.

In the two-year period 1975–76, he visited the United States, where he worked in the laboratories directed by Eric Kandel making a fundamental contribution to the studies on the intracellular mechanisms of nerve signal transduction, which will lead Kandel himself to win the Nobel Prize in Medicine in 2000.

In 1976, he returned to Italy and two years later became Professor of General Physiology at the Faculty of Sciences of the University of Pisa. From 1983 to 1986, Brunelli took the place of Prof. Moruzzi at the head of the CNR Institute of Physiology in Pisa. In the following four years he was director of the Department of Physiology and Biochemistry of the University of Pisa.

Brunelli died in Pisa on 25 November 2020, aged 81, from complications associated with COVID-19.

== Research activity ==
Brunelli began his career as a scientific researcher by investigating the nervous and hormonal mechanisms that control the emission of the luminous signals of Luciola lusitanica and demonstrating their circadian rhythms. The results of these experiments were published in a series of papers on the Archives Italiennes de Biologie from 1968 to 1973. Other studies were on the nervous system of the leech Hirudo medicinalis and visual perception in the common pigeon.

His research activity subsequently focused on the study of the neurobiological mechanisms of memory and non-associative learning in animal models. One of the main contributions of Brunelli was the identification of the cyclic AMP as the second messenger in nerve impulse transduction. In the mid-seventies it was known that serotonin acted on the terminals of sensory neurons by increasing the release of neurotransmitters into the synaptic cleft, but the mechanism of action was not known yet. Brunelli and colleagues injected cyclic AMP – whose role as a mediating molecule was well established – directly into the presynaptic terminal and observed that nerve transmission was facilitated.

This provided the most compelling evidence then available that cyclic AMP is involved in a specific physiological function in the nervous system and gave us an initial understanding of the molecular mechanisms of short-term memory.

— Eric R. Kandel

During the 1980s Brunelli continued his studies on the role of serotonin and intracellular calcium in synaptic modulation in the leech. The nervous system of this annelid consists of a chain of interconnected ganglia that contain relatively large and easily accessible neurons, lending itself well to electrophysiological recording. This has made it possible to make great progress in understanding the mechanisms of habituation and sensitization. In a series of experimental studies his group identified the role of acetyl-L-carnitine in influencing neuronal gene expression.

Before retiring from academic life, Brunelli directed an interuniversity research group investigating the physiological and medical aspects of the trigeminal-cardiac reflex (TCR) associated with proprioceptive stimulation of the jaw. The TCR is a still poorly known vagal reflex activated by the stimulation of the trigeminal nerve that induces a sustained reduction of heart rate and mean arterial pressure. Brunelli and colleagues observed the activation of the reflex following mandibular stretching in humans. Further experiments on the rat have shown a concurrent vasodilation of pial arterioles.
