= Diving reflex =

Physiological responses to immersion of air-breathing vertebrates

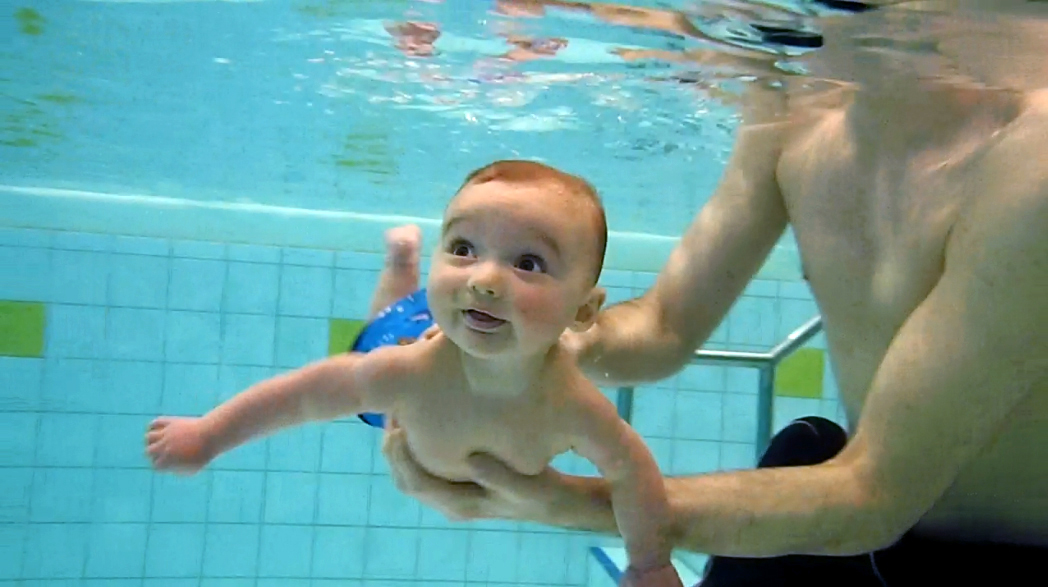
Diving reflex in a human baby

The diving reflex, also known as the diving response and mammalian diving reflex, is a set of physiological responses to immersion that overrides the basic homeostatic reflexes, and is found in all air-breathing vertebrates studied to date. It optimizes respiration by preferentially distributing oxygen stores to the heart and brain, enabling submersion for an extended time.

The diving reflex is exhibited strongly in aquatic mammals, such as seals, otters, dolphins, and muskrats, and exists as a lesser response in other animals, including human babies up to 6 months old (see infant swimming), and diving birds, such as ducks and penguins. Adult humans generally exhibit a mild response, although the dive-hunting Sama-Bajau people and the Haenyeo divers in the South Korean province of Jeju are notable outliers.

The diving reflex is triggered specifically by chilling and wetting the nostrils and face while breath-holding, and is sustained via neural processing originating in the carotid chemoreceptors. The most noticeable effects are on the cardiovascular system, which displays peripheral vasoconstriction, slowed heart rate, redirection of blood to the vital organs to conserve oxygen, release of red blood cells stored in the spleen, and, in humans, heart rhythm irregularities. Although aquatic animals have evolved profound physiological adaptations to conserve oxygen during submersion, the apnea and its duration, bradycardia, vasoconstriction, and redistribution of cardiac output occur also in terrestrial animals as a neural response, but the effects are more profound in natural divers.

== Physiological response ==
When the face is submerged and water fills the nostrils, sensory receptors sensitive to wetness within the nasal cavity and other areas of the face supplied by the fifth (V) cranial nerve (the trigeminal nerve) relay the information to the brain. The tenth (X) cranial nerve (the vagus nerve) – part of the autonomic nervous system – then produces bradycardia and other neural pathways elicit peripheral vasoconstriction, restricting blood from limbs and all organs to preserve blood and oxygen for the heart, brain, and lungs, concentrating flow in a heart-brain circuit and allowing the animal to conserve oxygen.

In humans, the diving reflex is not induced when limbs are introduced to cold water. Mild bradycardia is caused by subjects holding their breath without submerging the face in water. When breathing with the face submerged, the diving response increases proportionally to decreasing water temperature. However, the greatest bradycardia effect is induced when the subject is breath-holding with the face wetted. Apnea with nostril and facial cooling are triggers of this reflex.

Children tend to survive longer than adults when deprived of oxygen underwater. The exact mechanism for this effect has been debated and may be a result of brain cooling similar to the protective effects seen in people treated with deep hypothermia.

The diving response in animals, such as the dolphin, varies considerably depending on level of exertion during foraging.

=== Exceptions in human divers ===
In humans whose historic way of life involves foraging for food underwater by breath-hold diving, there is evidence for more extensive physiological and genetic adaptations of the diving reflex than in typical humans. Having harvested underwater seafood over centuries, the nomadic Sama-Bajau people of Southeast Asia have enlarged spleens and more intense peripheral vasoconstriction during breath-hold diving – giving advantages for prolonged underwater hunting – and display natural selection for the genes controlling these adaptations. Similarly, the Haenyeo women divers of South Korea have pronounced bradycardia and exceptional cold tolerance during breath-hold diving, with evidence of adaptive genetic variation contributing to these advantages.

=== Carotid body chemoreceptors ===
During sustained breath-holding while submerged, blood oxygen levels decline while carbon dioxide and acidity levels rise, stimuli that collectively act upon chemoreceptors located in the bilateral carotid bodies. As sensory organs, the carotid bodies convey the chemical status of the circulating blood to brain centers regulating neural outputs to the heart and circulation. Preliminary evidence in ducks and humans indicates that the carotid bodies are essential for these integrated cardiovascular responses of the diving response, establishing a "chemoreflex" characterized by parasympathetic (slowing) effects on the heart and sympathetic (vasoconstrictor) effects on the vascular system.

=== Circulatory responses ===
Plasma fluid losses due to immersion diuresis occur within a short period of immersion. Head-out immersion causes a blood shift from the limbs and into the thorax. The fluid shift is largely from the extravascular tissues and the increased atrial volume results in a compensatory diuresis. Plasma volume, stroke volume, and cardiac output remain higher than normal during immersion. The increased respiratory and cardiac workload causes increased blood flow to the cardiac and respiratory muscles. Stroke volume is not greatly affected by immersion or variation in ambient pressure, but bradycardia reduces the overall cardiac output, particularly due to the diving reflex in breath-hold diving.

==== Bradycardia and cardiac output ====
Bradycardia is the response to facial contact with cold water: the human heart rate slows down ten to twenty-five percent. Seals experience changes that are even more dramatic, going from about 125 beats per minute to as low as 10 on an extended dive. During breath-holding, humans also display reduced left ventricular contractility and diminished cardiac output, effects that may be more severe during submersion due to hydrostatic pressure.

Slowing the heart rate reduces the cardiac oxygen consumption, and compensates for the hypertension due to vasoconstriction. However, breath-hold time is reduced when the whole body is exposed to cold water as the metabolic rate increases to compensate for accelerated heat loss even when the heart rate is significantly slowed.

==== Splenic contraction ====
The spleen contracts in response to lowered levels of oxygen and increased levels of carbon dioxide, releasing red blood cells and increasing the oxygen capacity of the blood. This may start before the bradycardia.

==== Blood shift ====
Blood shift is a term used when blood flow to the extremities is redistributed to the head and torso during a breath-hold dive. Peripheral vasoconstriction occurs during submersion by resistance vessels limiting blood flow to muscles, skin, and viscera, regions which are "hypoxia-tolerant", thereby preserving oxygenated blood for the heart, lungs, and brain. The increased resistance to peripheral blood flow raises the blood pressure, which is compensated by bradycardia, conditions which are accentuated by cold water. Aquatic mammals have blood volume that is some three times larger per mass than in humans, a difference augmented by considerably more oxygen bound to hemoglobin and myoglobin of diving mammals, enabling prolongation of submersion after capillary blood flow in peripheral organs is minimized.

==== Arrhythmias ====
Cardiac arrhythmias are a common characteristic of the human diving response. As part of the diving reflex, increased activity of the cardiac parasympathetic nervous system not only regulates the bradycardia, but also is associated with ectopic beats which are characteristic of human heart function during breath-hold dives. Arrhythmias may be accentuated by neural responses to face immersion in cold water, distension of the heart due to central blood shift, and the increasing resistance to left ventricular ejection (afterload) by rising blood pressure. Other changes commonly measured in the electrocardiogram during human breath-hold dives include ST depression, heightened T wave, and a positive U wave following the QRS complex, measurements associated with reduced left ventricular contractility and overall depressed cardiac function during a dive.

=== Renal and water balance responses ===
In hydrated subjects, immersion will cause diuresis and excretion of sodium and potassium. Diuresis is reduced in dehydrated subjects, and in trained athletes in comparison with sedentary subjects.

=== Respiratory responses ===
Snorkel breathing is limited to shallow depths just below the surface due to the effort required during inhalation to overcome the hydrostatic pressure on the chest. Hydrostatic pressure on the surface of the body due to head-out immersion in water causes negative pressure breathing which shifts blood into the intrathoracic circulation.

Lung volume decreases in the upright position due to cranial displacement of the abdomen due to hydrostatic pressure, and resistance to air flow in the airways increases significantly because of the decrease in lung volume.

Hydrostatic pressure differences between the interior of the lung and the breathing gas delivery, increased breathing gas density due to ambient pressure, and increased flow resistance due to higher breathing rates may all cause increased work of breathing and fatigue of the respiratory muscles.

There appears to be a connection between pulmonary edema and increased pulmonary blood flow and pressure which results in capillary engorgement. This may occur during higher intensity exercise while immersed or submersed.

Facial immersion at the time of initiating breath-hold is a necessary factor for maximising the mammalian diving reflex in humans.

== Adaptations of aquatic mammals ==
Diving mammals have an elastic aortic bulb thought to help maintain arterial pressure during the extended intervals between heartbeats during dives, and have high blood volume, combined with large storage capacity in veins and retes of the thorax and head in seals and dolphins. Chronic physiological adaptations of blood include elevated hematocrit, hemoglobin, and myoglobin levels which enable greater oxygen storage and delivery to essential organs during a dive. Oxygen use is minimised during the diving reflex by energy-efficient swimming or gliding behaviour, and regulation of metabolism, heart rate, and peripheral vasoconstriction.

Aerobic diving capacity is limited by available oxygen and the rate at which it is consumed. Diving mammals and birds have a considerably greater blood volume than terrestrial animals of similar size, and in addition have a far greater concentration of haemoglobin and myoglobin, and this haemoglobin and myoglobin is also capable of carrying a higher oxygen load. During diving, the hematocrit and hemoglobin are temporarily increased by reflex splenic contraction, which discharges a large additional amount of red blood cells. The brain tissue of diving mammals also contains higher levels of neuroglobin and cytoglobin than terrestrial animals.

Aquatic mammals seldom dive beyond their aerobic diving limit, which is related to the myoglobin oxygen stored. The muscle mass of aquatic mammals is relatively large, so the high myoglobin content of their skeletal muscles provides a large reserve. Myoglobin-bound oxygen is only released in relatively hypoxic muscle tissue, so the peripheral vasoconstriction due to the diving reflex makes the muscles ischaemic and promotes early use of myoglobin bound oxygen.

== History ==
The diving bradycardia was first described by Edmund Goodwyn in 1786 and later by Paul Bert in 1870.

The diving reflex is closely linked to another physiological response inducing bradycardia—the trigeminocardiac reflex—which justifies its re-evaluation as a component of a broader family of trigeminal reflexes.

== Examples in fiction ==
- Jacques Mayol in the Luc Besson film The Big Blue
- Giacinta 'Jinx' Johnson in the James Bond film Die Another Day.
- A patient in tachycardia on ER in Season 4
- Jack Buggit in the novel The Shipping News by Annie Proulx
- In The Question #2 (March 1987), the Question recovers from drowning; his survival is attributed to the diving reflex.

== See also ==
- Cold shock response – Physiological response to sudden exposure to cold
