= Hypothermia =

Human body core temperature below 35 °C (95 °F)

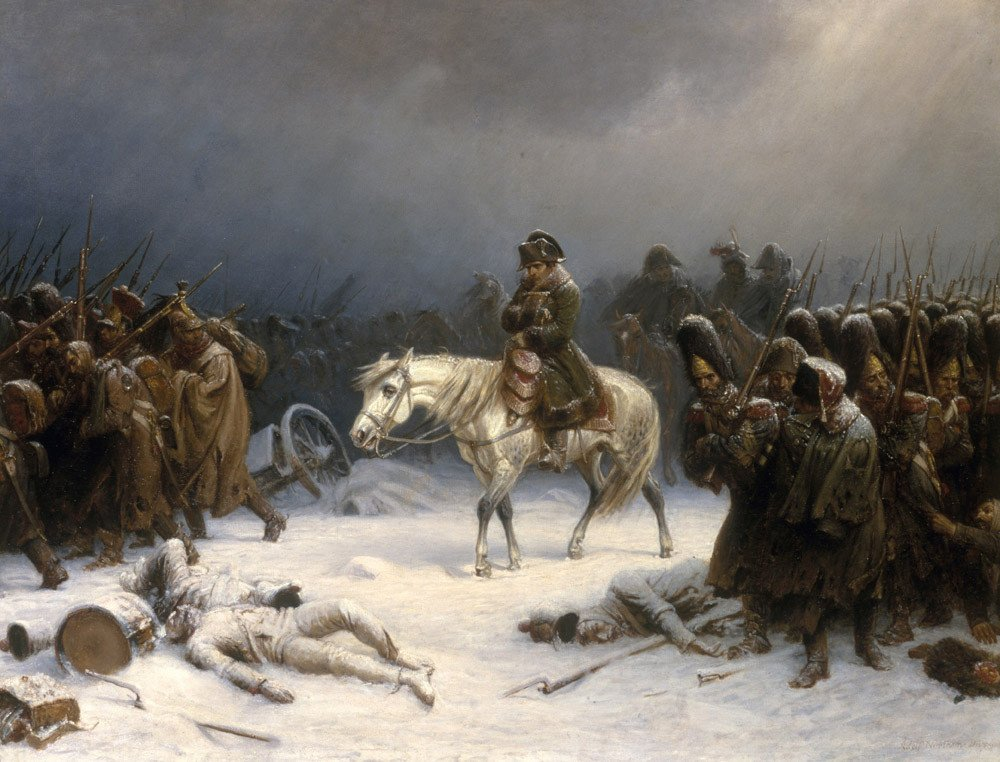
- During Napoleon Bonaparte's retreat from Russia in the winter of 1812, many troops died from hypothermia.
- Specialty: Critical care medicine
- Symptoms: Mild: Shivering, mental confusion; Moderate: No shivering, increased confusion; Severe: Paradoxical undressing, muscle rigidity, unconsciousness; Profound: No obvious vital signs
- Complications: Afterdrop, cardiac arrest
- Duration: Until the body temperature is raised to near-normal levels
- Types: Primary hypothermia: caused by exposure to a cold environment; Secondary hypothermia: caused by an underlying pathology that prevents the body from generating enough core heat
- Causes: Mainly exposure to cold weather and cold water immersion
- Risk factors: Alcohol intoxication, homelessness, low blood sugar, anorexia, advanced age, injuries and blood loss
- Diagnostic method: Based on symptoms or body temperature below 35.0 °C (95.0 °F)
- Prevention: Wearing adequate clothes for the weather, staying warm and dry
- Treatment: Mild: Warm drinks, warm clothing, physical activity; Moderate: Heating blankets, warmed intravenous fluid; Severe: Extracorporeal membrane oxygenation, cardiopulmonary bypass
- Medication: Sugar
- Frequency: Frequent in winter months, from November to March (Northern Hemisphere) or May to August (Southern Hemisphere)
- Deaths: 1,500 per year (US)

Hypothermia is defined as a body core temperature below 35.0 °C (95.0 °F) in humans. Symptoms depend on the temperature. In mild hypothermia, there is shivering and mental confusion. In moderate hypothermia, shivering stops and confusion increases. In severe hypothermia, there may be hallucinations and paradoxical undressing, the victim's self-removal of their own clothing, as well as an increased risk of the heart's stopping.

Hypothermia has two main types of causes. It classically occurs from exposure to cold weather and cold water immersion. It may also occur from any condition that decreases heat production or increases heat loss. Commonly, this includes alcohol intoxication but may also include low blood sugar, anorexia, and advanced age. Body temperature is usually maintained near a constant level of 36.5–37.5 °C (97.7–99.5 °F) through thermoregulation. Efforts to increase body temperature involve shivering, increased voluntary activity, and putting on warmer clothing. Hypothermia may be diagnosed by either a person's symptoms in the presence of risk factors or measuring a person's core temperature.

The treatment of mild hypothermia involves warm drinks, warm clothing, and voluntary physical activity. In those with moderate hypothermia, heating blankets and warmed intravenous fluids are recommended. People with moderate or severe hypothermia should be moved gently. In severe hypothermia, extracorporeal membrane oxygenation (ECMO) or cardiopulmonary bypass may be useful. In those without a pulse, cardiopulmonary resuscitation (CPR) is indicated along with the above measures. Rewarming is typically continued until a victim's temperature is greater than 32 °C (90 °F). If there is no improvement at this point or the blood potassium level is greater than 12 millimoles per litre at any time, resuscitation may be discontinued.

Hypothermia is the cause of at least 1,500 deaths a year in the United States alone. It is more common in older people and men. One of the lowest documented body temperatures which someone with accidental hypothermia has survived is 12.7 °C (54.9 °F) in a 2-year-old boy from Poland named Adam. Survival after more than six hours' CPR has been described. When ECMO or bypass is used, survival is around 50%. Deaths due to hypothermia have played an important role in many wars.

The term is from Greek ῠ̔πο (ypo), meaning "under", and θέρμη (thérmē), meaning "heat". The opposite of hypothermia is hyperthermia, an increased body temperature due to failed thermoregulation.

== Classification ==
Hypothermia classification
Swiss system	Symptoms	By degree	Temperature
Stage 1	Awake and shivering	Mild	32–35 °C (89.6–95.0 °F)
Stage 2	Drowsy and not shivering	Moderate	28–32 °C (82.4–89.6 °F)
Stage 3	Unconscious, not shivering	Severe	20–28 °C (68.0–82.4 °F)
Stage 4	No vital signs	Profound	<20 °C (68.0 °F)

Hypothermia is often defined as any body temperature below 35.0 °C (95.0 °F). With this method it is divided into degrees of severity based on the core temperature.

Another classification system, the Swiss staging system, divides hypothermia on the basis of the presenting symptoms, as is preferred when it is not possible to determine an accurate core temperature.

Other cold-related injuries that can be present either alone or in combination with hypothermia include:

- Chilblains: condition caused by repeated exposure of skin to temperatures just above freezing. The cold causes damage to small blood vessels in the skin. This damage is permanent and the redness and itching will return with additional exposure. The redness and itching typically occurs on cheeks, ears, fingers, and toes.
- Frostbite: the freezing and destruction of tissue, which happens below the freezing point of water
- Frostnip: a superficial cooling of tissues without cellular destruction
- Trench foot or immersion foot: a condition caused by repetitive exposure to cold water at non-freezing temperatures

The normal human body temperature is often stated as 36.5–37.5 °C (97.7–99.5 °F). Hyperthermia and fevers are defined as a temperature of greater than 37.5–38.3 °C (99.5–100.9 °F).

== Signs and symptoms ==
Signs and symptoms vary depending on the degree of hypothermia, and may be divided by the three stages of severity. People with hypothermia may appear pale and feel cold to touch. Infants with hypothermia may feel cold when touched, with bright red skin and an unusual lack of energy.

Behavioural changes such as impaired judgement, impaired sense of time and place, unusual aggression, and numbness can be observed in individuals with hypothermia; they can also deny their condition and refuse any help. A hypothermic person can be euphoric and hallucinating.

Cold stress refers to a near-normal body temperature with low skin temperature; signs include shivering. Cold stress is caused by cold exposure and can lead to hypothermia and frostbite if not treated.

=== Mild ===
Symptoms of mild hypothermia may be vague, with sympathetic nervous system excitation (shivering, high blood pressure, fast heart rate, fast respiratory rate, and contraction of blood vessels). These are all physiological responses to preserve heat. Increased urine production due to cold, mental confusion, and liver dysfunction may also be present. Hyperglycemia may be present, as glucose consumption by cells and insulin secretion both decrease, and tissue sensitivity to insulin may be blunted. Sympathetic activation also releases glucose from the liver, but in many cases this appears to result more often from hypoglycemia, especially in people with alcoholic intoxication. Hypoglycemia is also found in many people with hypothermia, as hypothermia may be a result of hypoglycemia, which dysregulates body temperature by decreasing energy demand and impairs judgment.

=== Moderate ===
As hypothermia progresses, symptoms include amnesia, confusion, slurred speech, decreased reflexes, and loss of fine motor skills.

=== Severe ===
As the temperature decreases, further physiological systems falter and heart rate, respiratory rate, and blood pressure all decrease. This results in an expected heart rate in the 30s at a temperature of 28 °C (82 °F).

There is often cold, inflamed skin, hallucinations, lack of reflexes, fixed dilated pupils, low blood pressure, pulmonary edema, and shivering is often absent. Pulse and respiration rates usually decrease significantly, but fast heart rates (ventricular tachycardia, atrial fibrillation) can also occur. Atrial fibrillation is not typically a concern in and of itself.

=== Paradoxical undressing ===
Twenty to fifty percent of hypothermia deaths are associated with paradoxical undressing. This typically occurs during moderate and severe hypothermia, as the victim becomes disoriented, confused, and combative. They may begin discarding their clothing, so increasing the rate of heat loss.

Rescuers who are trained in mountain survival techniques are taught to expect this; however, people who die from hypothermia in urban environments and are found undressed are sometimes incorrectly assumed to have been subjected to sexual assault.

One explanation for the effect is a cold-induced malfunction of the hypothalamus, the part of the brain that regulates body temperature. Another explanation is that the muscles contracting peripheral blood vessels become exhausted (known as a loss of vasomotor tone) and relax, leading to a sudden surge of blood (and heat) to the extremities, causing the victim to feel overheated.

=== Terminal burrowing ===
An apparent self-protective behaviour, known as "terminal burrowing", or "hide-and-die syndrome", occurs in the final stages of hypothermia. Those affected will enter small, enclosed spaces, such as underneath beds or behind wardrobes. It is often associated with paradoxical undressing. Researchers in Germany claim this is "obviously an autonomous process of the brain stem, which is triggered in the final state of hypothermia and produces a primitive and burrowing-like behavior of protection, as seen in hibernating mammals". This happens mostly in cases where temperature drops slowly.

== Causes ==
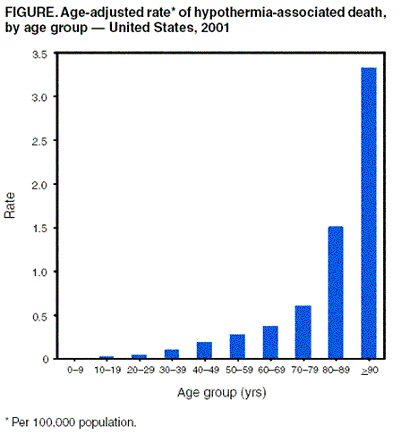
The rate of death from hypothermia is strongly related to age in the United States.

Hypothermia usually occurs from exposure to low temperatures, and is frequently complicated by alcohol consumption. Any condition that decreases heat production, increases heat loss, or impairs thermoregulation, however, may contribute. Thus, hypothermia risk factors include: substance use disorders (including alcohol use disorder), homelessness, any condition that affects judgment (such as hypoglycemia), the extremes of age, poor clothing, chronic medical conditions (such as hypothyroidism and sepsis), and living in a cold environment. Hypothermia occurs frequently in major trauma, and is also observed in severe cases of anorexia nervosa. Hypothermia is also associated with worse outcomes in people with sepsis— while most people with sepsis develop fevers (elevated body temperature), some develop hypothermia.

In urban areas, hypothermia frequently occurs with chronic cold exposure, such as in cases of homelessness, as well as with immersion accidents involving alcohol, other drugs, or mental illness. While studies have shown that people experiencing homelessness are at risk of premature death from hypothermia, the true incidence of hypothermia-related deaths in this population is difficult to determine. In more rural environments, the incidence of hypothermia is higher among people with significant comorbidities and less ability to move independently. With rising interest in wilderness exploration and outdoor and water sports, the incidence of hypothermia secondary to accidental cold exposure may become more frequent in the general population.

=== Alcohol ===
Alcohol consumption increases the risk of hypothermia in two ways: vasodilation and dysregulation of temperature-controlling systems in the brain. Vasodilation increases blood flow to the skin, resulting in heat being lost to the environment. This produces the effect of feeling warm, when one is actually losing heat. Alcohol also affects the temperature-regulating system in the brain, decreasing the body's ability to shiver and use energy that would normally aid the body in generating heat. The overall effects of alcohol lead to a decrease in both body temperature and ability to generate body heat in response to cold environments. Alcohol is a common risk factor for death due to hypothermia. Between 33% and 73% of hypothermia cases are complicated by alcohol.

=== Water immersion ===
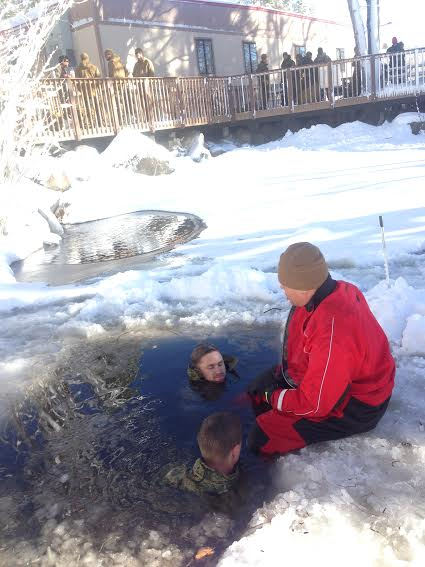
Two American marines participating in an immersion hypothermia exercise

Hypothermia continues to be a major limitation to swimming or diving in cold water. The reduction in finger dexterity due to pain or numbness decreases general safety and work capacity, which consequently increases the risk of other injuries.

Other factors predisposing to immersion hypothermia include dehydration, inadequate rewarming between repetitive dives, starting a dive while wearing cold, wet dry suit undergarments, sweating with work, inadequate thermal insulation, and poor physical conditioning.

Heat is lost much more quickly to water than to air. Thus, water temperatures that would be quite reasonable as outdoor air temperatures can lead to hypothermia, although this is not usually the direct clinical cause of death for those not rescued from accidental immmersion in cold water. A water temperature of 10 °C (50 °F) can kill a human adult in as little as one hour, and water temperatures near freezing can kill in as little as 15 minutes. During the sinking of the Titanic, most people who entered the −2 °C (28 °F) water died in 15–30 minutes.

The actual cause of death in cold water is usually the bodily reactions to heat loss and to freezing water, rather than hypothermia (loss of core temperature) itself. For example, plunged into freezing seas, around 20% of victims die within two minutes from cold shock (uncontrolled rapid breathing and gasping, causing water inhalation; massive increase in blood pressure and cardiac strain, leading to cardiac arrest; and panic, causing ineffectual flailing of the limbs); another 50% die within 15–30 minutes from cold incapacitation (inability to use or control limbs and hands for swimming or gripping, as the body "protectively" shuts down the peripheral muscles of the limbs to protect its core). Exhaustion and unconsciousness cause drowning, claiming the rest within a similar time.

== Pathophysiology ==
Heat is primarily generated in muscle tissue, including the heart, and in the liver, while it is lost through the skin (90%) and lungs (10%). Heat production may be increased (to over 1200 W in trained endurance athletes) through muscle contractions (i.e. exercise and shivering). The rate of heat loss is determined, as with any object, by convection, conduction, and radiation. The rates of these can be affected by thermal inertia—that is, by body mass index, body surface area to volume ratios, clothing, and other environmental conditions.

Many changes to physiology occur as body temperatures decrease. These occur in the cardiovascular system leading to the Osborn J wave and other dysrhythmias, decreased central nervous system electrical activity, cold diuresis, and non-cardiogenic pulmonary edema.

Research has shown that glomerular filtration rates (GFR) decrease as a result of hypothermia. In essence, hypothermia increases preglomerular vasoconstriction, thus decreasing both renal blood flow (RBF) and GFR.

== Diagnosis ==
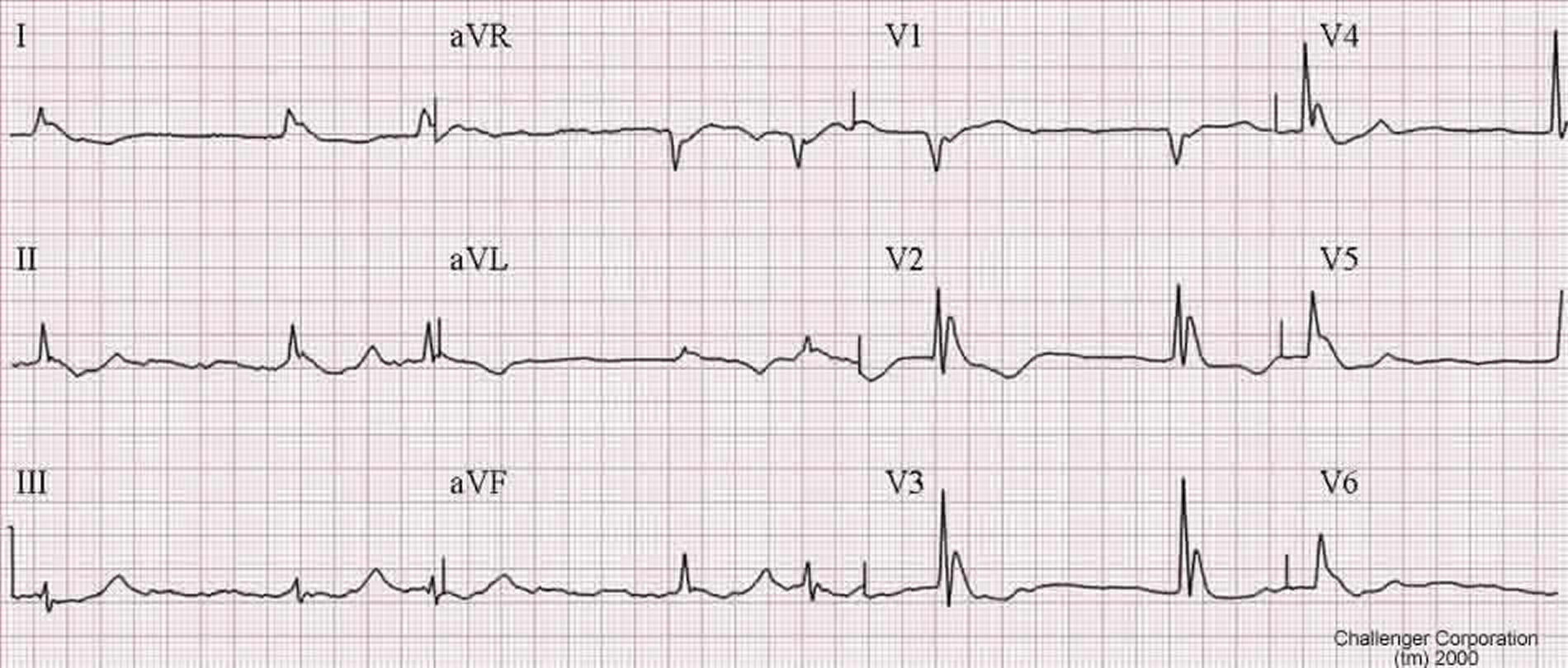
Atrial fibrillation and Osborn J waves in a person with hypothermia. Note what could be mistaken for ST elevation.

Accurate determination of core temperature often requires a special low temperature thermometer, as most clinical thermometers do not measure accurately below 34.4 °C (93.9 °F). A low temperature thermometer can be placed in the rectum, esophagus or bladder. Esophageal measurements are the most accurate and are recommended once a person is intubated. Other methods of measurement such as in the mouth, under the arm, or using an infrared ear thermometer are often not accurate.

As a hypothermic person's heart rate may be very slow, prolonged feeling for a pulse could be required before detecting. In 2005, the American Heart Association recommended at least 30–45 seconds to verify the absence of a pulse before initiating CPR. Others recommend a 60-second check.

The classical ECG finding of hypothermia is the Osborn J wave. Also, ventricular fibrillation frequently occurs below 28 °C (82 °F) and asystole below 20 °C (68 °F). The Osborn J may look very similar to those of an acute ST elevation myocardial infarction. Thrombolysis as a reaction to the presence of Osborn J waves is not indicated, as it would only worsen the underlying coagulopathy caused by hypothermia.

== Prevention ==
Staying dry and wearing proper clothing help to prevent hypothermia. Synthetic and wool fabrics are superior to cotton as they provide better insulation when wet and dry. Some synthetic fabrics, such as polypropylene and polyester, are used in clothing designed to wick perspiration away from the body, such as liner socks and moisture-wicking undergarments. Clothing should be loose fitting, as tight clothing reduces the circulation of warm blood. In planning outdoor activity, prepare appropriately for possible cold weather. Those who drink alcohol before or during outdoor activity should ensure at least one sober person responsible for safety is present.

Covering the head is effective, but no more effective than covering any other part of the body. While common folklore says that people lose most of their heat through their heads, heat loss from the head is no more significant than that from other uncovered parts of the body. However, heat loss from the head is significant in infants, whose head is larger relative to the rest of the body than in adults. Several studies have shown that for uncovered infants, lined hats significantly reduce heat loss and thermal stress. Children have a larger surface area per unit mass, and other things being equal should have one more layer of clothing than adults in similar conditions, and the time they spend in cold environments should be limited. However, children are often more active than adults, and may generate more heat. In both adults and children, overexertion causes sweating and thus increases heat loss.

Building a shelter can aid survival where there is danger of death from exposure. Shelters can be constructed out of a variety of materials. Metal can conduct heat away from the occupants and is sometimes best avoided. The shelter should not be too big so body warmth stays near the occupants. Good ventilation is essential especially if a fire will be lit in the shelter. Fires should be put out before the occupants sleep to prevent carbon monoxide poisoning. People caught in very cold, snowy conditions can build an igloo or snow cave to shelter.

The United States Coast Guard promotes using life vests to protect against hypothermia through the 50/50/50 rule: If someone is in 10 °C (50 °F) water for 50 minutes, they have a 50 percent better chance of survival if they are wearing a life jacket. A heat escape lessening position can be used to increase survival in cold water.

Babies should sleep at 16–20 °C (61–68 °F) and housebound people should be checked regularly to make sure the temperature of the home is at least 18 °C (64 °F).

== Management ==
Degree	Rewarming technique
Mild (stage 1)	Passive rewarming
Moderate (stage 2)	Active external rewarming
Severe (stage 3 and 4)	Active internal rewarming

Aggressiveness of treatment is matched to the degree of hypothermia. Treatment ranges from noninvasive, passive external warming to active external rewarming, to active core rewarming. In severe cases resuscitation begins with simultaneous removal from the cold environment and management of the airway, breathing, and circulation. Rapid rewarming is then commenced. Moving the person as little and as gently as possible is recommended as aggressive handling may increase risks of a dysrhythmia.

Hypoglycemia is a frequent complication and must be tested for and treated. Intravenous thiamine and glucose is often recommended, as many causes of hypothermia are complicated by Wernicke's encephalopathy.

The UK National Health Service advises against putting a person in a hot bath, massaging their arms and legs, using a heating pad, or giving them alcohol. These measures can cause a rapid fall in blood pressure and potential cardiac arrest.

=== Rewarming ===
Rewarming can be done with a number of methods including passive external rewarming, active external rewarming, and active internal rewarming. Passive external rewarming involves the use of a person's own ability to generate heat by providing properly insulated dry clothing and moving to a warm environment. Passive external rewarming is recommended for those with mild hypothermia.

Active external rewarming involves applying warming devices externally, such as a heating blanket. These may function by warmed forced air (Bair Hugger is a commonly used device), chemical reactions, or electricity. In wilderness environments, hypothermia may be helped by placing hot water bottles in both armpits and in the groin. Active external rewarming is recommended for moderate hypothermia. Active core rewarming involves the use of intravenous warmed fluids, irrigation of body cavities with warmed fluids (the chest or abdomen), use of warm humidified inhaled air, or use of extracorporeal rewarming such as via a heart lung machine or extracorporeal membrane oxygenation (ECMO). Extracorporeal rewarming is the fastest method for those with severe hypothermia. When severe hypothermia has led to cardiac arrest, effective extracorporeal warming results in survival with normal mental function about 50% of the time. Chest irrigation is recommended if bypass or ECMO is not possible.

Rewarming shock (or rewarming collapse) is a sudden drop in blood pressure in combination with a low cardiac output which may occur during active treatment of a severely hypothermic person. There was a theoretical concern that external rewarming rather than internal rewarming may increase the risk. These concerns were partly believed to be due to afterdrop, a situation detected during laboratory experiments where there is a continued decrease in core temperature after rewarming has been started. Recent studies have not supported these concerns, and problems are not found with active external rewarming.

=== Fluids ===
For people who are alert and able to swallow, drinking warm (not hot) sweetened liquids can help raise the temperature. General medical consensus advises against alcohol and caffeinated drinks. As most hypothermic people are moderately dehydrated due to cold-induced diuresis, warmed intravenous fluids to a temperature of 38–45 °C (100–113 °F) are often recommended.

=== Cardiac arrest ===
In those without signs of life, cardiopulmonary resuscitation (CPR) should be continued during active rewarming. For ventricular fibrillation or ventricular tachycardia, a single defibrillation should be attempted. However, people with severe hypothermia may not respond to pacing or defibrillation. It is not known if further defibrillation should be withheld until the core temperature reaches 30 °C (86 °F). In Europe, epinephrine is not recommended until the person's core temperature reaches 30 °C (86 °F), while the American Heart Association recommends up to three doses of epinephrine before a core temperature of 30 °C (86 °F) is reached. Once a temperature of 30 °C (86 °F) has been reached, normal ACLS protocols should be followed.

== Prognosis ==
It is usually recommended not to declare a person dead until their body is warmed to a near normal body temperature of greater than 32 °C (90 °F), since extreme hypothermia can suppress heart and brain function. This is summarized in the common saying "You're not dead until you're warm and dead." Exceptions include if there are obvious fatal injuries or the chest is frozen so that it cannot be compressed. If a person was buried in an avalanche for more than 35 minutes and is found with a mouth packed full of snow without a pulse, stopping early may also be reasonable. This is also the case if a person's blood potassium is greater than 12 mmol/L.

Those who are stiff with pupils that do not move may survive if treated aggressively. Survival with good function also occasionally occurs even after the need for hours of CPR. Children who have near-drowning accidents in water near 0 °C (32 °F) can occasionally be revived, even over an hour after losing consciousness. The cold water lowers the metabolism, allowing the brain to withstand a much longer period of hypoxia. While survival is possible, mortality from severe or profound hypothermia remains high despite optimal treatment. Studies estimate mortality at between 38% and 75%.

In those who have hypothermia due to another underlying health problem, when death occurs it is frequently from that underlying health problem.

== Epidemiology ==
Extreme or moderate cold creates a significantly higher risk of mortality than extreme or moderate heat.

Between 1995 and 2004 in the United States, an average of 1,560 cold-related emergency department visits occurred per year and in the years 1999 to 2004, an average of 647 people died per year due to hypothermia. Of deaths reported between 1999 and 2002 in the US, 49% of those affected were 65 years or older and two-thirds were male. Most deaths were not work related (63%) and 23% of affected people were at home. The majority of hypothermia deaths occur in the winter months, from November to February. In the United Kingdom, an estimated 300 deaths per year are due to hypothermia, whereas the incidence of hypothermia-related deaths in Canada averages 129 deaths per year.

== History ==
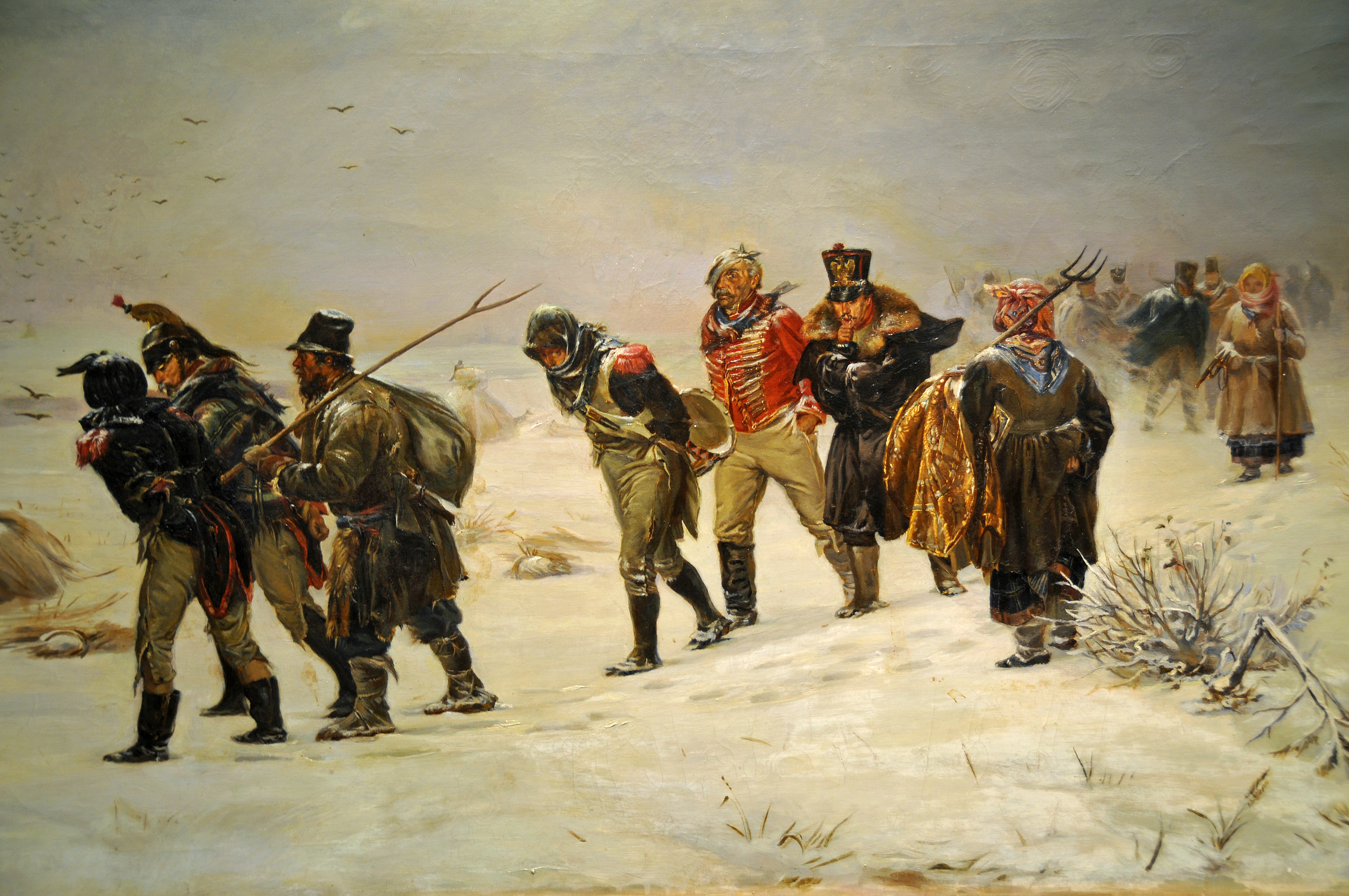
The armies of Napoleon retreat from Russia in 1812.

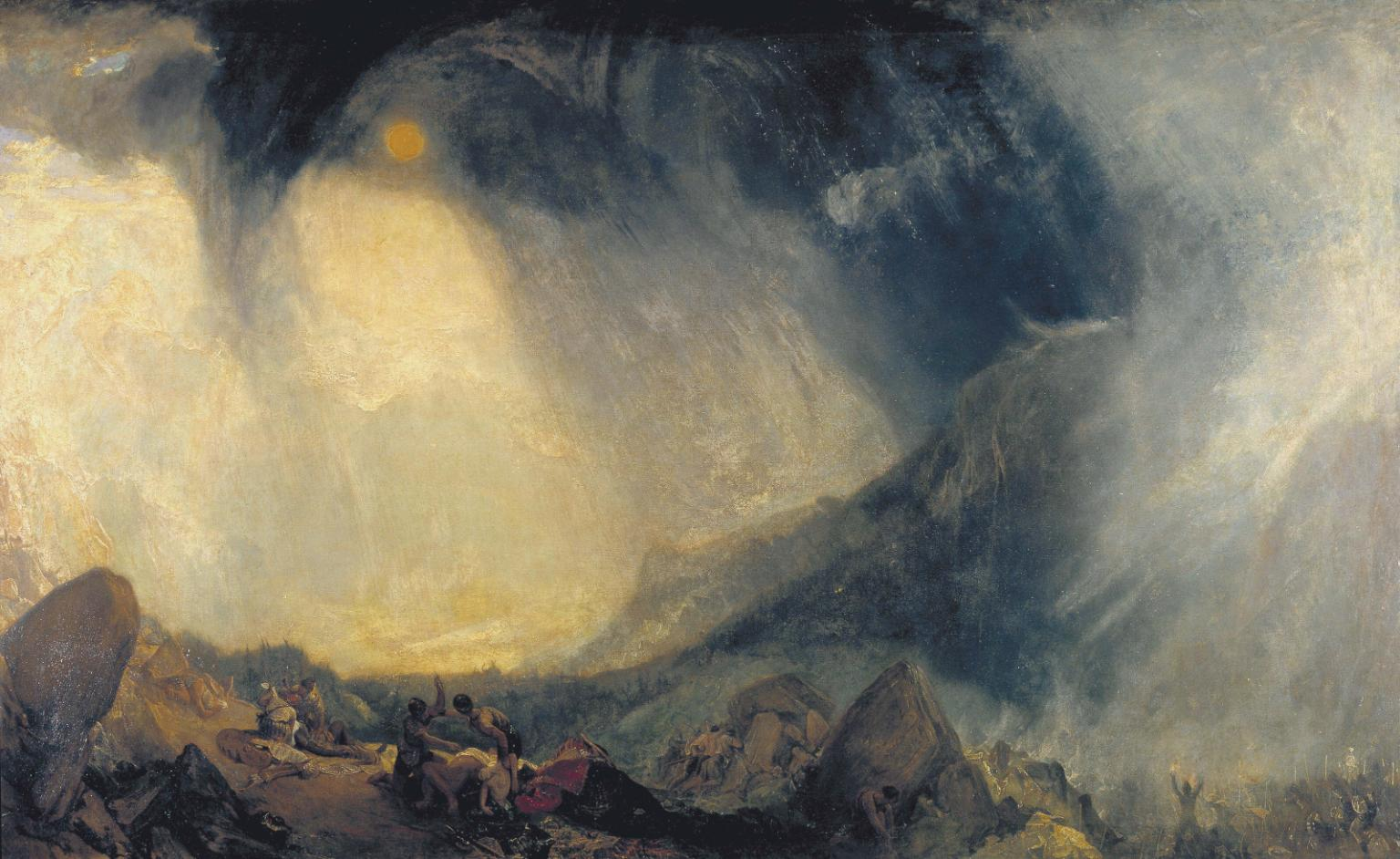
Snow-storm: Hannibal and His Army Crossing the Alps, J. M. W. Turner

Hypothermia has played a major role in the success or failure of many military campaigns, from Hannibal's loss of nearly half his men in the Second Punic War (218 B.C.) to the near destruction of Napoleon's armies in Russia in 1812. Men wandered around confused by hypothermia, some lost consciousness and died, others shivered, later developed torpor, and tended to sleep. Others too weak to walk fell on their knees; some stayed that way for some time resisting death. The pulse of some was weak and hard to detect; others groaned; yet others had eyes open and wild with quiet delirium. Deaths from hypothermia in Russian regions continued through the first and second world wars, especially on the Eastern Front in battles such as the Battle of Moscow and the Battle of Stalingrad where German soldiers were not provided with winter clothing.

Civilian examples of deaths caused by hypothermia occurred during the sinkings of the RMS Titanic and RMS Lusitania, and more recently of the MS Estonia.

Antarctic explorers developed hypothermia; Ernest Shackleton and his team measured body temperatures "below 94.2°, which spells death at home", though this probably referred to oral temperatures rather than core temperature and corresponded to mild hypothermia. One of Scott's team, Atkinson, became confused through hypothermia.

Nazi human experimentation during World War II amounting to medical torture included hypothermia experiments, which killed many victims. There were 360 to 400 experiments and 280 to 300 subjects, indicating some had more than one experiment performed on them. Various methods of rewarming were attempted: "One assistant later testified that some victims were thrown into boiling water for rewarming".

In 2024, at least six babies in Gaza Strip died of hypothermia under the harsh rain and cold, which they had to endure in flimsy camps due to the bombing of their homes and forced displacement inflicted upon them by the Israel Defense Forces. Three of the babies died in the coastal zone of Al-Mawasi, which their families had been forced to evacuate to, given its designation as a "safe zone".

== Medical use ==
Various degrees of hypothermia may be deliberately induced in medicine for purposes of treatment of brain injury, or lowering metabolism so that total brain ischemia can be tolerated for a short time. Deep hypothermic circulatory arrest is a medical technique in which the brain is cooled as low as 10 °C, which allows the heart to be stopped and blood pressure to be lowered to zero, for the treatment of aneurysms and other circulatory problems that do not tolerate arterial pressure or blood flow. The time limit for this technique, as also for accidental arrest in ice water (which internal temperatures may drop to as low as 15 °C), is about one hour.

== Other animals ==
Hypothermia can happen in most mammals in cold weather and can be fatal. Baby mammals such as kittens are unable to regulate their body temperatures and have a risk of hypothermia if they are not kept warm by their mothers.

Many animals other than humans often induce hypothermia during hibernation or torpor.

Water bears (Tardigrade), microscopic multicellular organisms, can survive freezing at low temperatures by replacing most of their internal water with the sugar trehalose solution, preventing the crystallization that otherwise damages cell membranes.

== See also ==
- Diving reflex – Physiological responses to immersion of air-breathing vertebrates
- "To Build a Fire" – Short story by Jack London, two versions of a short story by Jack London portraying the effects of cold and hypothermia
- "The Little Match Girl" – 1845 fairy tale by Hans Christian Andersen, a short story by Hans Christian Andersen about a child dying of hypothermia
- Dyatlov Pass incident
