= Afterdrop =

Further lowering of core body temperature after cold exposure after reheating has started

Afterdrop refers to the continued cooling of core body temperature during the initial stages of rewarming from hypothermia. This phenomenon is primarily attributed to peripheral vasodilation, a process in which blood vessels near the skin's surface dilate, allowing cold blood from the extremities to return to the core. This return of cold blood results in a further decrease in deep body temperature. Another explanation involves heat conduction, where the body cools from the outside in, creating a temperature gradient from the warm core to the cool periphery. This gradient allows the continued transfer of heat from the core to peripheral tissues during rewarming.

In severe cases, afterdrop can lead to post-rescue collapse, where patients may experience cardiovascular instability or cardiac arrest. However, the clinical significance of afterdrop varies, as it does not always result in severe outcomes for every individual undergoing rewarming from hypothermia. Afterdrop is more prevalent among individuals who have been rapidly cooled or rewarmed, and less common in those who experienced slow and prolonged cooling or delayed rewarming.

The management of hypothermia and prevention of afterdrop involve carefully monitored rewarming techniques. Passive external rewarming, which uses the body's own heat production by providing insulation and a warm environment, is often recommended for mild cases of hypothermia. For more severe cases, active external rewarming methods such as warm water immersion, heating pads, or forced-air warming systems may be used to gradually raise core temperature while minimising the risk of exacerbating afterdrop. Active internal rewarming, involving methods such as warm intravenous fluids and extracorporeal blood warming, is employed in controlled medical settings to manage body temperature effectively and limit the potential for afterdrop by reducing the temperature gradient between the core and periphery.

In emergency medical care, training and awareness about afterdrop are important for first responders and medical personnel. Educating rescuers on potential afterdrop and appropriate rewarming strategies can significantly improve patient outcomes. Public awareness campaigns about hypothermia prevention and treatment can help at-risk populations, such as outdoor enthusiasts and those in cold climates, to better prepare for and respond to cold exposure.
