= List of biology journals =

This is a list of articles about scientific journals in biology and its various subfields.

== General ==
- Acta Biológica Colombiana
- American Journal of Physical Anthropology
- The American Naturalist
- Annual Review of Physiology
- Asian-Australasian Journal of Bioscience and Biotechnology
- Bioanalysis
- BioEssays
- Biologia
- Biological Theory
- The Biological Bulletin
- Biological Communications
- Biological Reviews
- Biology Letters
- Biology of Reproduction
- Biometrika
- BioScience
- Central European Journal of Biology
- Communications Biology
- Critical Reviews in Clinical Laboratory Sciences
- Cold Spring Harbor Perspectives in Biology
- Disease Models & Mechanisms
- eLife
- Emu
- The FASEB Journal
- Frontiers in Biology
- International Journal of Biological Sciences
- International Journal of Biometeorology
- Journal of Circadian Rhythms
- The Journal of Experimental Biology
- Journal of Lipid Research
- Journal of Mathematical Biology
- Journal of Natural History
- Journal of Theoretical Biology
- Nature Protocols
- Nature Reviews Drug Discovery
- Open Life Sciences
- PeerJ
- Philosophical Transactions of the Royal Society B
- PLOS Biology
- Proceedings of the Royal Society B: Biologial Sciences
- Quarterly Review of Biology
- Revista Chilena de Historia Natural
- Revista de Biologia
- The Scientific World Journal
- Theoretical Biology and Medical Modelling
- Zeitschrift für Naturforschung
- Zeitschrift für Naturforschung C

== Agriculture ==
- Advances in Agronomy
- Agriculture, Ecosystems & Environment
- Agroecology and Sustainable Food Systems
- Animal
- Animal Feed Science and Technology
- Animal Frontiers (Oxford University Press)
- Animal Genetics
- Animal Production
- Animals
- Annual Review of Animal Biosciences
- Bulgarian Journal of Agricultural Science
- EuroChoices
- Journal of Animal Breeding and Genetics
- Journal of Animal Science
- Journal of Dairy Science
- Journal of Food Science
- Nature Food
- Pertanika Journal of Tropical Agricultural Science
- Poultry Science

== Anatomy/Morphology ==
- Annals of Anatomy
- Clinical Anatomy
- Journal of Anatomy
- Journal of Morphology
- Microscopy Research and Technique
- The Anatomical Record
- Zoomorphology

== Biochemistry ==
- Annual Review of Biochemistry
- Biocatalysis & Biotransformation
- Biochemical and Biophysical Research Communications
- Biochemical Journal
- Biochemical Society Transactions
- Biochemistry
- Biochemistry and Cell Biology
- Biochimica et Biophysica Acta
- Biotechnology and Applied Biochemistry
- Cell Biochemistry & Function
- Comparative Biochemistry and Physiology B
- Critical Reviews in Biochemistry and Molecular Biology
- FEBS Journal
- FEBS Letters
- Journal of Biochemistry
- Journal of Biological Chemistry
- Journal of Liposome Research
- Journal of Structural Biology
- Methods in Enzymology
- Molecular and Cellular Biochemistry
- Proteomes
- The Open Clinical Biochemistry Journal
- Trends in Biochemistry

== Bioengineering ==
- Annual Review of Biomedical Engineering
- Biomedical Microdevices
- Biotechnology and Bioprocess Engineering
- Critical Reviews in Biotechnology
- International Journal of Computational Biology and Drug Design
- Nature Biotechnology
- Nature Biomedical Engineering
- Progress in Biophysics and Molecular Biology

== Biophysics ==
- Annual Review of Biophysics
- Biochimica et Biophysica Acta
- Biophysical Journal
- FEBS Letters
- Structure
- Quarterly Reviews of Biophysics

== Biotechnology ==
- Applied Microbiology and Biotechnology
- Biotechnology Advances
- Biotechnology and Bioengineering
- Biotechnology Letters
- Current Opinion in Biotechnology
- Journal of Biotechnology
- Nature Biotechnology
- Trends in Biotechnology

== Cell and Molecular ==
- Biologics: Targets and Therapy
- Biochemistry and Cell Biology
- Cell
- Cell Biochemistry & Function
- Cell Communication & Adhesion
- Cell Communication and Signaling
- Cell Proliferation
- Cell Reports
- Current Opinion in Cell Biology
- Genes & Development
- Growth Factors
- Journal of Cell Biology
- Journal of Cell Science
- Journal of Molecular Biology
- Molecular & Cellular Proteomics
- Molecular Biology
- Molecular Biology and Evolution
- Molecular Phylogenetics and Evolution
- Molecular Systems Biology
- Nature Reviews Molecular Cell Biology
- Small GTPases
- Trends in Cell Biology
- [./Https://ricosbiology.net Ricos Biology Journal]

== Ecology ==
- African Journal of Ecology
- Annual Review of Ecology, Evolution, and Systematics
- Aquatic Conservation: Marine and Freshwater Ecosystems
- Conservation Biology
- Diversity and Distributions
- Ecography
- Ecological Complexity
- Ecology
- Ecology Letters
- European Journal of Ecology
- Evolution
- Evolution Letters
- Functional Ecology
- Frontiers in Ecology and the Environment
- Journal of Animal Ecology
- Journal of Ecology
- Journal of Evolutionary Biology
- Journal of Human Evolution
- Methods in Ecology and Evolution
- Molecular Ecology
- Oecologia
- Oikos
- Trends in Ecology and Evolution

== Evolutionary Biology ==
- The American Naturalist
- Annual Review of Ecology, Evolution, and Systematics
- BMC Evolutionary Biology
- Ecology and Evolution
- Evolution
- Journal of Evolutionary Biology
- Methods in Ecology and Evolution
- Molecular Biology and Evolution
- Nature Ecology & Evolution
- Systematic Biology
- Trends in Ecology and Evolution

== Genetics ==
- Annual Review of Genetics
- Annual Review of Genomics and Human Genetics
- Current Opinion in Genetics and Development
- European Journal of Human Genetics
- G3: Genes, Genomes, Genetics
- Genes & Development
- Genetica
- Genetics
- Genome
- Genome Biology
- Genome Research
- Heredity
- Human Genomics and Proteomics
- Nature Reviews Genetics
- Nucleic Acids Research
- PLOS Genetics
- Somatic Cell and Molecular Genetics
- Trends in Genetics

== Immunology ==
- Annals of Allergy, Asthma & Immunology
- Cell Host & Microbe
- Frontiers in Immunology
- Immunity
- Molecular Imaging and Biology
- Nature Immunology
- Nature Reviews Immunology
- Trends in Immunology
- Ricos Biology Journal

== Malacology ==
- Iberus

== Microbiology and infectious disease ==
- Advances in Microbial Physiology
- African Journal of Infectious Diseases
- Annual Review of Microbiology
- Canadian Journal of Microbiology
- Current Opinion in Microbiology
- The Lancet Infectious Diseases
- Trends in Microbiology
- Microbiological Research
- Microbiology and Molecular Biology Reviews
- Microbiology Spectrum
- mSphere (ASM Press)
- Nature Reviews Microbiology
- Ricos Biology journal

== Neuroscience ==
- African Journal of Neurological Sciences
- Archives Italiennes de Biologie
- Genes, Brain and Behavior
- International Journal of Neuroscience
- Nature Neuroscience
- Nature Reviews Neuroscience
- Neural Regeneration Research
- Neurogenetics
- Neuron
- Neuroscience
- Nutritional Neuroscience
- Journal of Clinical Neuroscience
- Journal of Neurophysiology
- Journal of Neuroscience
- Neurotoxicity Research
- Trends in Cognitive Sciences

== Nutrition ==
- African Journal of Food, Agriculture, Nutrition and Development
- Annual Review of Nutrition
- Applied Physiology, Nutrition, and Metabolism
- British Journal of Nutrition
- Nature Food
- npj Science of Food
- Nutrition Research Reviews
- Public Health Nutrition

== Pharmacy ==
- Acta Facultatis Pharmaceuticae Universitatis Comenianae
- Ricos Biology Journal

== Virology ==
- Annual Review of Virology
- AIDS
- AIDS Research and Human Retroviruses
- Antiviral Chemistry & Chemotherapy
- Antiviral Research
- Antiviral Therapy
- Future Virology
- Herpes
- Journal of Acquired Immune Deficiency Syndromes
- Journal of General Virology
- Journal of Virology
- Retrovirology
- Viral Hepatitis
- Virology
- Virology Journal
- Virus Evolution
- Ricos Biology Journal

== Zoology ==
Ricos Biology journal

== See also ==
- List of scientific journals
- BioMed Central
