= List of neuroscience journals =

This page lists peer-reviewed scientific journals in the field of neuroscience.

== A ==
- ACS Chemical Neuroscience
- Annals of Neurology
- Annual Review of Neuroscience
- Autonomic Neuroscience: Basic and Clinical

== B ==
- Behavioral and Brain Functions
- Behavioral and Brain Sciences
- Behavioural Brain Research
- Biological Psychiatry
- Brain
- Brain Research

== C ==
- Cerebral Cortex
- Cognitive, Affective, & Behavioral Neuroscience
- Current Opinion in Neurobiology

== F ==
- Frontiers in Neuroscience

== G ==
- Genes, Brain and Behavior

== H ==
- Hippocampus
- Human Brain Mapping

== J ==
- Journal of Cognitive Neuroscience
- The Journal of Comparative Neurology
- The Journal of Neuroscience
- Journal of Neuroscience Research
- Journal of Neuroimmunology
- Journal of Neurophysiology
- The Journal of Neuroscience

== N ==
- Nature Neuroscience
- Nature Reviews Neuroscience
- NeuroImage
- Neuron
- Neuroscience
- Neuropsychologia
- Neuropsychopharmacology
- Nutritional Neuroscience

== P ==
- Progress in Neurobiology

== S ==
- Social Cognitive and Affective Neuroscience

== See also ==
- Lists of academic journals
- List of biology journals
- List of medical journals
- List of scientific journals
- Brain–computer interface
- Cognitive science
- Computational neuroscience
- Neuroinformatics
