= Herpes (disambiguation) =

Herpes is a disease.

Herpes may also refer to:

== Diseases ==
- Genital herpes, a genital infection
- Herpes zoster, a disease better known as shingles
- Herpes labialis, a disease
- Herpes simplex virus, organism that causes infection
- Herpesviridae, a large family of viruses

== Insects ==
- Herpes (beetle), a beetle genus in the tribe Thecesternini
- Herpes, a true bug genus, unresolved taxon, described in 1905 by Melichar

== Other uses ==
- Herpes (journal), a peer-reviewed medical journal published by Cambridge Medical Publication
