= C15orf62 =

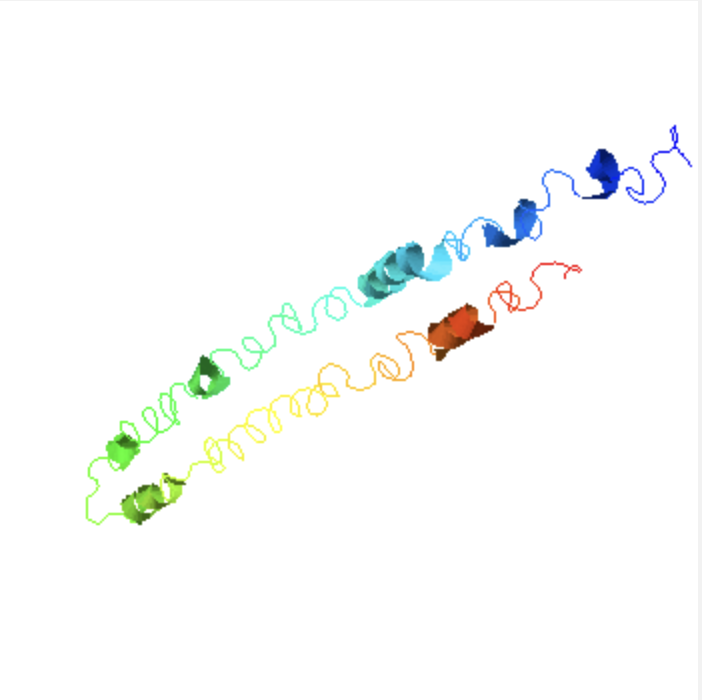

Identifiers
- Aliases: C15orf62, chromosome 15 open reading frame 62
- External IDs: MGI: 3651144; HomoloGene: 85847; GeneCards: C15orf62; OMA:C15orf62 - orthologs

Gene location (Human)
Chr.	Chromosome 15 (human)
Band	15q15.1	Start	40,769,980 bp
Band	15q15.1	End	40,772,449 bp

Gene location (Mouse)
Chr.	Chromosome 2 (mouse)
Band	2|2 E5	Start	119,004,990 bp
Band	2|2 E5	End	119,008,056 bp
RNA expression pattern
Bgee	Human / Mouse (ortholog); Top expressed in: buccal mucosa cell; skin of leg; oral cavity; amniotic fluid; tendon of biceps brachii; skin of abdomen; olfactory zone of nasal mucosa; minor salivary glands; mucosa of pharynx; granulocyte / Top expressed in: lip; esophagus; skin of abdomen; hair follicle; skin of back; superior cervical ganglion; cornea; conjunctival fornix; skin of external ear; embryo; More reference expression data
BioGPS	n/a
Gene ontology
Molecular function	GTPase activator activity
Cellular component	cytoplasm; plasma membrane; mitochondrion
Biological process	positive regulation of pseudopodium assembly; positive regulation of actin filament polymerization; Rho protein signal transduction; regulation of cell shape; positive regulation of GTPase activity
Sources:Amigo / QuickGO
Orthologs
Species	Human	Mouse
Entrez	643338	623781
Ensembl	ENSG00000188277	ENSMUSG00000055926
UniProt	A8K5M9	Q8CE97
RefSeq (mRNA)	NM_001130448	NM_001039223
RefSeq (protein)	NP_001123920	NP_001034312
Location (UCSC)	Chr 15: 40.77 – 40.77 Mb	Chr 2: 119 – 119.01 Mb
PubMed search
- Wikidata
View/Edit Human	View/Edit Mouse

C15orf62 is a protein which in humans is encoded by the C15orf62 gene. The protein displays high levels of expression in the esophagus and skin of human tissue. C15orf62 is a regulatory protein involved in mitochondrial function and cytoskeletal organization, playing roles in ribosomal biogenesis, Rho protein signal transduction, and protein turnover through ubiquitination. It connects mitochondrial activity to cell structure, signaling, and biogenesis through its unique amino acid composition and post-translational modifications.

== Gene ==
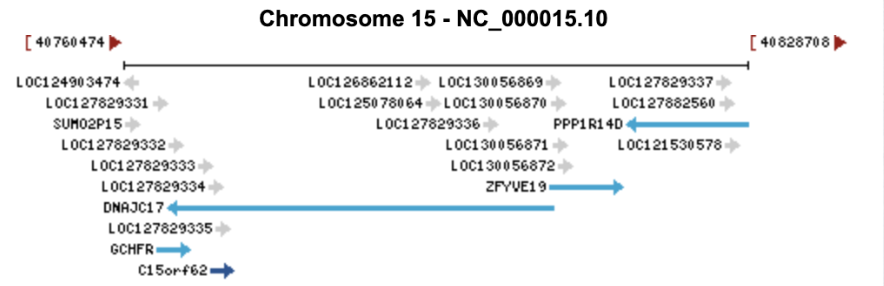
Gene family of human C15orf62 from the National Center for Biotechnology Information (NCBI Gene).

The gene is also known as chromosome 15 open reading frame 62. The human C15orf62 gene spans 2,470 base pairs, and is oriented on the plus strand of cytogenetic band 15q15.1. The C15orf62 gene contains a single exon and transcribes a protein-coding mRNA that encodes a 175 amino acid protein.

== Protein ==
Human C15orf62 encodes a single protein, with just a singular isoform. The protein has a molecular weight of 19.7 kD and an isoelectric point (pI) of 8.66. C15orf62 has a high abundance of arginine and significantly lower levels of valine. A dot-matrix analysis of C15orf62 revealed one prominent internal amino acid repeat, "RL-R-SS."

The protein contains eight motifs; an amidation site, an N-glycosylation site, cAMP- and a cGMP-dependent protein kinase phosphorylation sites, a casein kinase II phosphorylation site, an N-myristoylation site, a protein kinase C phosphorylation site, and a protein prenyltransferases alpha subunit repeat profile, and a domain of unknown function (DUF2437).

C15orf62 contains a histidine kinase sensor, TorS sensor domain, functioning in response to diverse signals and mediating signal transduction across the plasma membrane in all prokaryotes and certain eukaryotes.

== Gene level regulation ==
C15orf62 RNA expression patterns reveal tissue enhanced in the esophagus and skin. Ubiquitously moderate to low expression can be seen across other human tissues. Microarray data from normal tissue expression profiling of 24 human C15orf62 tissue samples revealed expression is moderate to low in most parts of the body based on findings in the National Center for Biotechnology Information, Gene Expression Omnibus (NCBIGeo). In-situ hybridization of the human brain from Allen Brain Atlas indicated that C15orf62 exhibits the highest expression levels throughout the myelencephalon. In contrast, expression in the cerebral cortex is exceptionally lower.

Immunohistochemical staining of the human esophagus displayed moderate cytoplasmic positivity of C15orf62 in squamous epithelial cells.

== Transcript Level Regulation ==
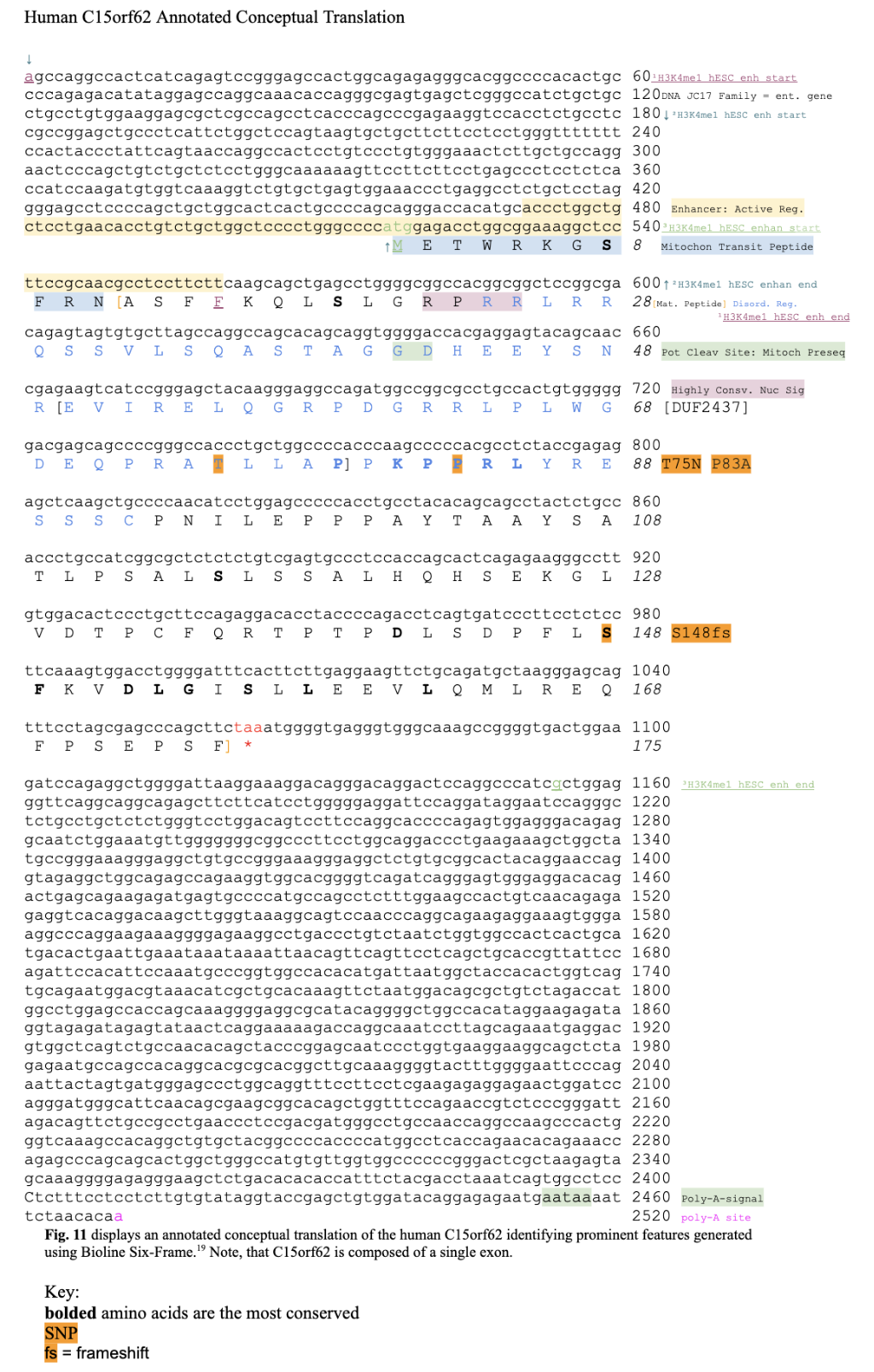
Annotated conceptual translation of the human C15orf62 gene, highlighting prominent features generated using Bioline Six-Frame. Note that C15orf62 consists of a single exon.

The gene contains an active enhancer region proceeding the coding sequence (CDS) and three histone H3 lysine 4 mono-methylation (H3K4me1) human embryonic stem cell (hESC) sites marking poised or active enhancers throughout C15orf62. H3K4me1 facilitates promoter-enhancer interactions and gene activation during embryonic stem cell differentiation.

== Protein level regulation ==
The C15orf62 gene is localized to the mitochondria with a confidence level of 78.3%.

The following post-translation modification tools revealed notable findings: YinoYang indicated several O-beta GlcNAc attachment signals. Phosphosite detected six phosphorylation sites. NetPhos - 3.1 indicated several phosphorylation sites. NetAcet - 1.0 displayed an acetylation at one sequence, position 3 T, and NetNGlyc displayed one signal at position 11, NASF.

PSORT II detected two nuclear localization signals highly conserved in orthologs (RPRR and PRRLRRQ).

PSORT II also identified a cleavage site for a mitochondrial pre-sequence in the protein, using the Gavel tool. The cleavage occurs after residue 38, at the sequence RRQ|SS. This is consistent with the R-2 motif (arginine at position -2), which is a common feature of mitochondrial targeting sequences cleaved by mitochondrial processing peptidases. This suggests that the protein is transported to the mitochondria, where its pre-sequence is removed to generate the mature form.

== Homology ==
=== Orthologs ===
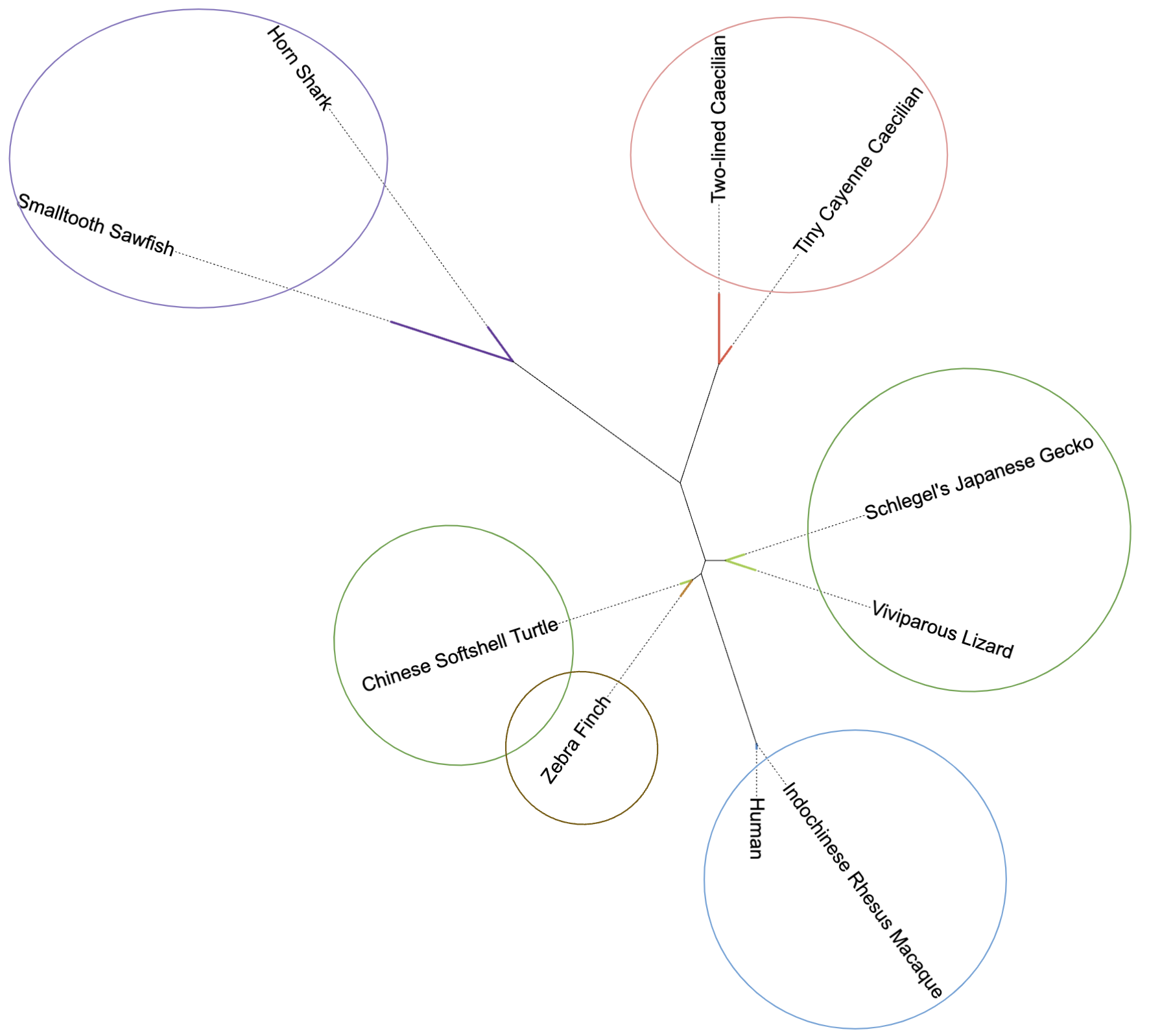
An unrooted phylogenetic tree depicting orthologs of human C15orf62 created using NGPhylogeny.fr. The colored circles indicate the classes used to group organisms: blue for mammals, brown for aves, green for reptiles, red for amphibians, and purple for chondrichthyes.

The C15orf62 gene has many orthologs but is found exclusively in vertebrates. The most divergent orthologs are within the class Chondrichthyes (cartilaginous fish), which diverged approximately 462 million years ago (MYA).

This gene is present across mammals, birds, reptiles, amphibians, and cartilaginous fish. The most evolutionarily distant ortholog of human C15orf62 is found in the smalltooth sawfish (Pristis pectinata), which exhibits 20.7% sequence identity and 32% sequence similarity to the human gene. This pattern implies that while C15orf62 is relatively well-conserved within the vertebrate lineage, its function may have diverged or adapted significantly across different classes, particularly in more evolutionarily distant groups such as amphibians and cartilaginous fish.

Table: Orthologs of Human C15orf62
C15orf62	Genus/Species	Common Name	Taxonomic Group (Order)	Median Date of Divergence (MYA)	Accession Number	Sequence Length (aa)	Sequence Identity (%)	Sequence Similarity (%)	Sequence Divergence (%)	Corrected Divergence (%)
Mammalia	Homo sapiens	Human	Primates	0	NP_001123920.1	175	100	100	(N/A)	(N/A)
Aves	Anas platyrhynchos	Mallard	Anseriformes	319	XP_012963840.1	176	42.0	55.9	58.0	86.8
Aves	Struthio camelus australis	South African Ostrich	Struthioniformes	319	KFV84981.1	182	39.9	56.9	60.1	91.9
Aves	Merops nubicus	Northern Carmine Bee-eater	Coraciiformes	319	XP_008942659.1	176	38.8	55.9	61.2	94.7
Aves	Taeniopygia guttata	Zebra Finch	Passeriformes	319	XP_012429774.1	171	38.6	53.8	61.4	95.2
Aves	Gallus gallus	Red Junglefowl	Galliformes	319	XP_001232488.1	176	38.3	55.3	61.7	96.0
Reptillia	Chelonoidis abingdonii	Pinta Island Tortoise	Testudines	319	XP_032624925.1	169	41.0	61.2	59.0	89.2
Reptillia	Pelodiscus sinensis	Chinese Softshell Turtle	Testudines	319	XP_014431805.1	169	42.0	61.3	38.7	86.8
Reptillia	Caretta caretta	Loggerhead sea turtle	Testudines	319	XP_048708641.1	169	40.4	62.4	59.6	90.6
Reptillia	Crocodylus porosus	Saltwater Crocodile	Crocodylia	319	XP_019407196.1	179	38.3	56.3	61.7	96.0
Reptillia	Zootoca vivipara	Viviparous lizard	Squamata	319	XP_034967260.1	180	36.3	51.8	63.7	101.3
Reptillia	Notechis scutatus	Eastern Tigersnake	Squamata	319	XP_026520364.1	175	36.0	55.4	64.0	102.2
Reptillia	Crotalus tigris	Tiger Rattlesnake	Squamata	319	XP_039179775.1	176	35.9	52.1	64.1	102.4
Reptillia	Protobothrops mucrosquamatus	Brown-Spotted Pit Viper	Squamata	319	XP_015670018.1	176	35.1	52.7	64.9	104.7
Reptillia	Gekko japonicus	Schlegel's Japanese Gecko	Squamata	319	XP_015270831.1	177	34.7	53.4	65.3	105.9
Reptillia	Thamnophis sirtalis	Common Gartersnake	Squamata	319	XP_013916913.1	176	34.0	52.7	66.0	107.9
Amphibia	Microcaecilia unicolor	Tiny Cayenne Caecilian	Caecilians	352	XP_030069876.1	181	28.5	39.8	71.5	125.6
Amphibia	Rhinatrema bivittatum	Two-lined Caecilian	Caecilians	352	XP_029454446.1	205	26.3	39.3	73.5	133.6
Chondrichthyes	Heterodontus francisci	Horn Shark	Heterodontiformes	462	XP_067895762.1	195	23.2	34.8	76.8	146.1
Chondrichthyes	Scyliorhinus canicula	Small-spotted Catshark	Carcharhiniformes	462	XP_038639367.1	196	22.5	30.9	69.1	149.2
Chondrichthyes	Pristis pectinata	Smalltooth Sawfish	Rhinopristiformes	462	XP_051900207.1	245	20.7	32.0	68.0	157.5

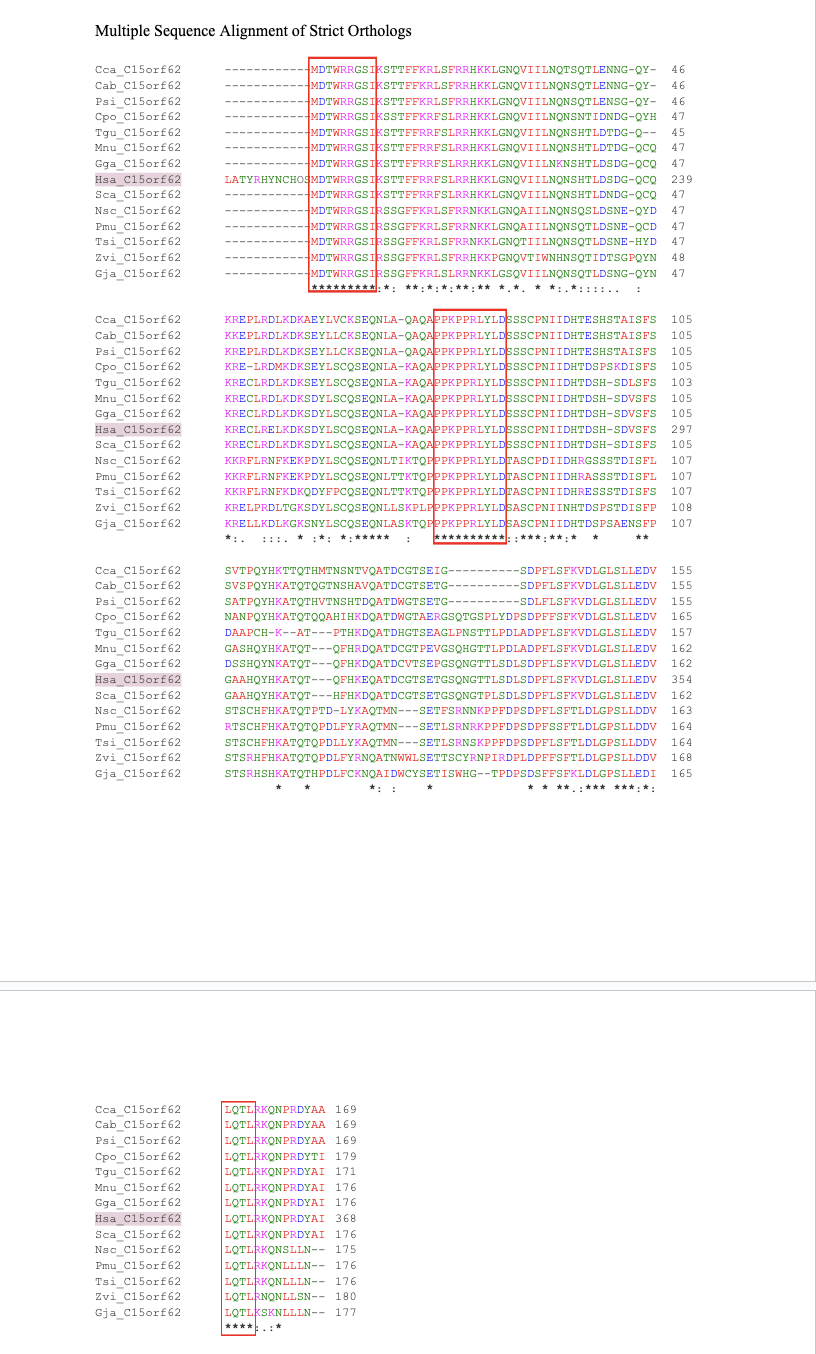
Strict ortholog alignment of the C15orf62 gene in Homo sapiens, generated using the Clustal Omega tool. Amino acids with similar chemical properties are color-coded, with highly conserved sequences marked by asterisks (*), moderately conserved sequences by colons (:), and less conserved sequences by periods (.). Highly repeated conserved regions are highlighted with red boxes for emphasis.

The above table displays orthologs of human C15orf62 in organisms of various classes. The orthologs have been grouped according to the sequence identity of the human protein. Mammalia (100%), aves (38%-42%), reptilia (34%-41%), amphibia (26%-29%), and chondrichthyes (20%-23%). NCBI's Basic Local Alignment Search Tool (BLAST), TimeTree, and EMBOSS Needle were utilized to collect the above data.

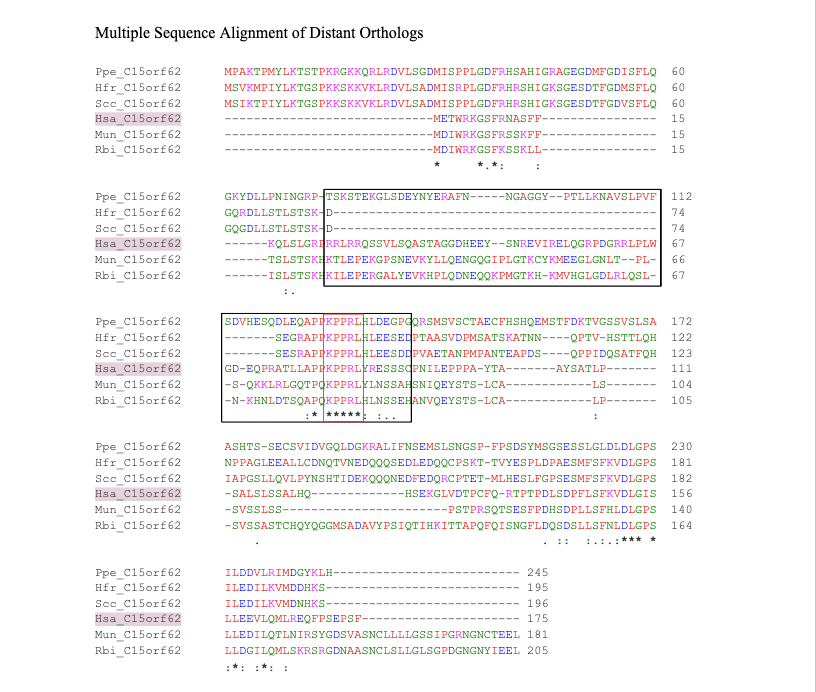
Distant ortholog alignment of the C15orf62 gene in Homo sapiens generated using Clustal Omega. Amino acids with similar chemical properties are color-coded, with highly conserved regions marked by asterisks (*), moderately conserved regions by colons (:), and lower conservation by periods (.). Highly repeated conserved regions are highlighted with red boxes, while the disordered region of the protein is enclosed in black boxes.

=== Paralogs ===
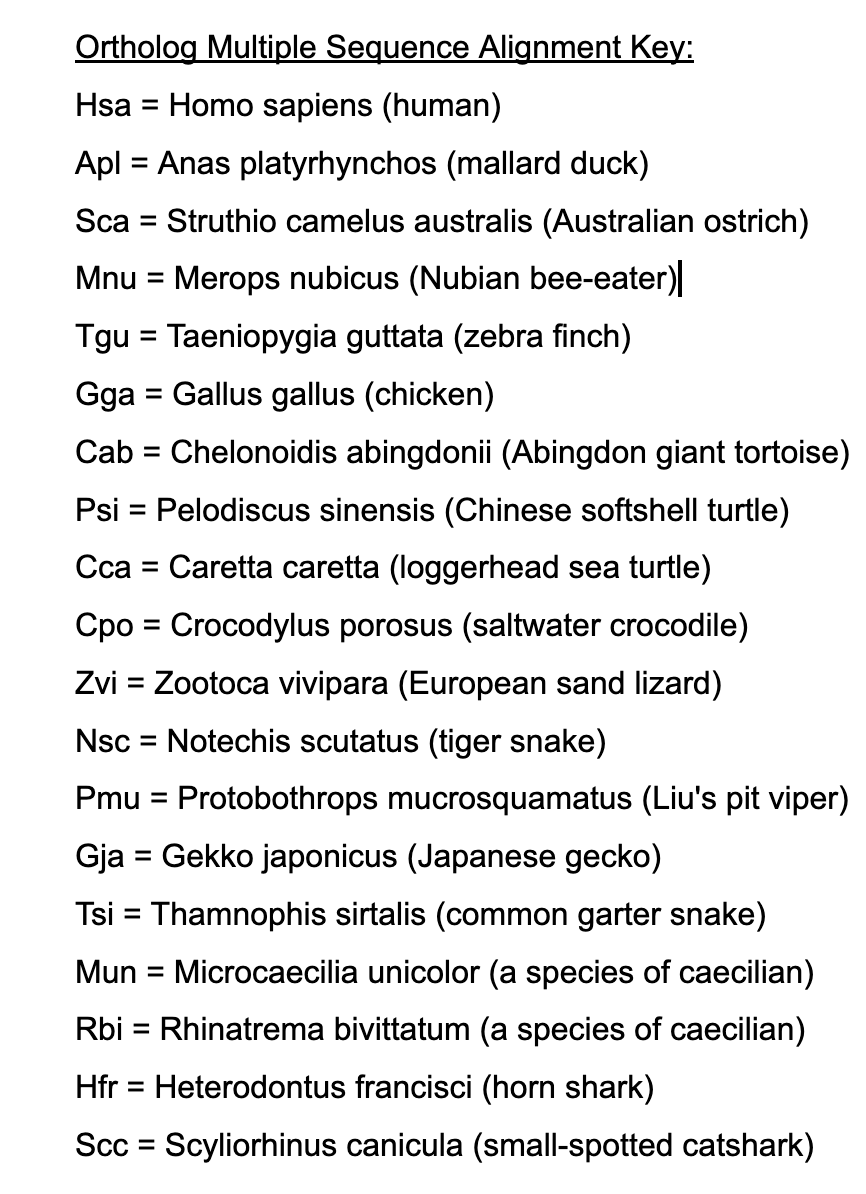
Human C15orf62 multiple sequence alignment key.

C15orf62 has no paralogs as can be determined by a BLAST run on NCBI Protein using the human C15orf62 sequence against the non-redundant database. The lack of significant results indicated that the gene has no duplications within the species.

== Biochemistry ==
C15orf62 plays a key role in both mitochondrial function and cytoskeletal organization. It is involved in Rho protein signal transduction, regulating cytoskeletal dynamics and cell shape through interactions with small GTPases. In the mitochondria, it is directly involved in ribosomal biogenesis, supported by its interactions with mitochondrial ribosomal proteins such as MRPS18A and GFM2. The protein contains a mitochondrial targeting sequence that is cleaved at residue 38, confirming its role in mitochondrial processes. Additionally, C15orf62 interacts with NEDD4, an E3 ubiquitin ligase, indicating its involvement in protein turnover through ubiquitination. With its unique amino acid composition and multiple post-translational modification sites, C15orf62 acts as a regulatory protein connecting mitochondrial activity to processes like biogenesis, signaling, and cell structure.

== Interacting proteins ==
Human neural precursor cell expressed, developmentally down-regulated 4 (NEDD4), an E3 ubiquitin-protein ligase involved in regulating various cellular processes such as signal transduction, cell differentiation, and apoptosis, interacts with human C15orf62, as determined by phage display. This interaction suggests a role for C15orf62 in protein turnover through ubiquitination.

Additionally, C15orf62 has an interactome involving several mitochondrial proteins, including C15orf61, C3orf33, MRPS18A, MRPL53, GFM2, MTER4, and DNAJC11, indicating its involvement in mitochondrial ribosome biogenesis and other mitochondrial functions. Interactions with proteins like DNAJC17, DNAJC4, and ZFYVE19, localized in other cellular compartments, suggest C15orf62 may also be involved in processes beyond the mitochondria, such as protein folding and cell division.

== Clinical significance ==
C15orf62 has been identified as a methylene-driven gene in thyroid cancer. Hypomethylation causes gene over-expression, and hypermethylation leads to low gene expression, both key factors in tumor development. C15orf62 has also been linked to breast cancer susceptibility performing a role in mitochondrial ribosomal biogenesis, assembling mitochondrial ribosomes.

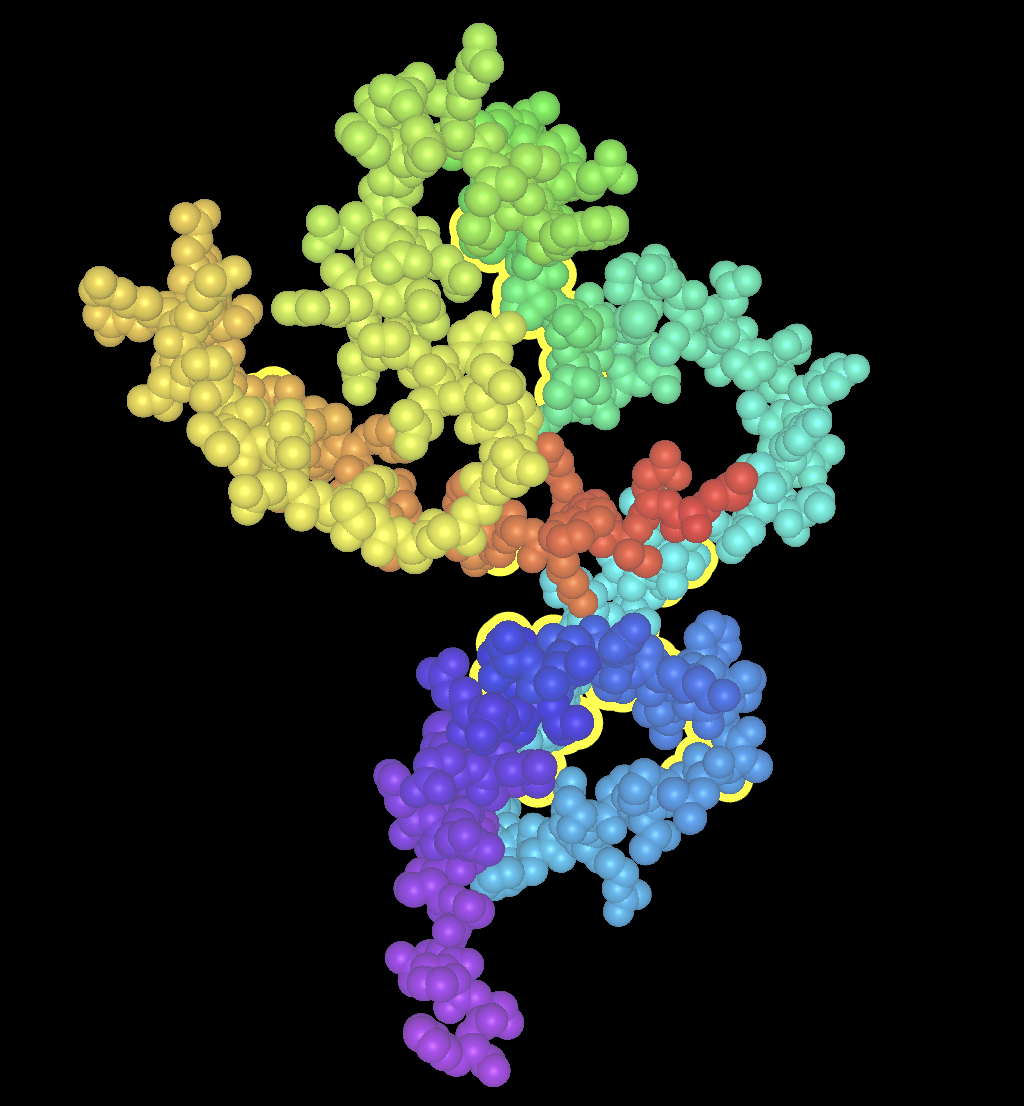
Alternative tertiary structure of the human C15orf62 protein, shown as a space-filling model with conserved regions highlighted based on identified conserved sites in the conceptual translation. The structure was generated by AlphaFold and visualized using NCBI iCn3D.

Identified single nucleotide polymorphisms (SNPs) in human C15orf62 include T75N, P83A, and S148fs.
