= Mary Jane Osborn =

American biochemist and molecular biologist (1927–2019)

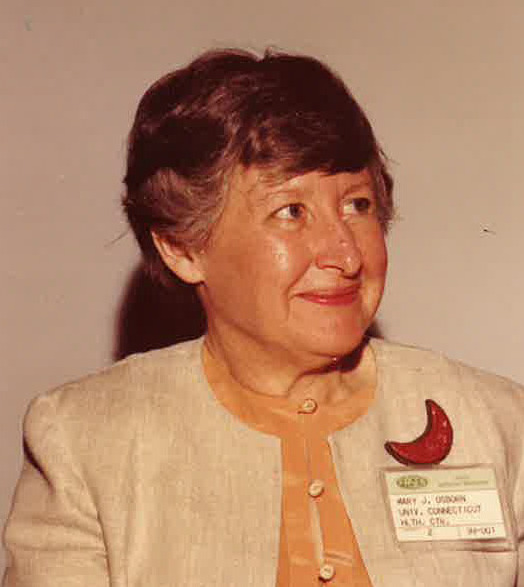
- Presenting an award in 1982
- Born: Mary Jane Merten; September 24, 1927; Colorado Springs, Colorado
- Died: January 17, 2019 (aged 91); Farmington, Connecticut
- Education: University of California, Berkeley (BA); University of Washington (Ph.D.)
- Known for: research on lipopolysaccharides, discovering the mechanism of action of methotrexate
- Scientific career
- Fields: Biochemistry, microbiology, molecular biology
- Institutions: New York University College of Medicine; Albert Einstein College of Medicine; University of Connecticut School of Medicine; University of Connecticut Health Center

Mary Jane Osborn (September 24, 1927 – January 17, 2019) was an American biochemist and microbiologist known for her research on the biosynthesis of lipopolysaccharide (bacterial endotoxin), a key component of the outer membrane of Gram-negative bacteria, and discovering the mechanism of action of the anti-cancer drug methotrexate. She headed the Department of Molecular Biology and Biophysics at the University of Connecticut Health Center and served as president of the American Society for Biochemistry and Molecular Biology.

== Early life and education ==
Mary Jane Merten was born on September 24, 1927, in Colorado Springs, Colorado. Her family moved to Beverly Hills, California when she was five, and her father was very supportive of her scientific interests and ambitions.

She received a bachelor's degree in physiology from the University of California at Berkeley in 1948. She then earned a Ph.D. in biochemistry from the University of Washington in 1958, where her thesis research investigated the function of folic acid-dependent enzymes and vitamins. In 1957, while working in the laboratory of F. M. Huennekens, she discovered the mechanism of action of methotrexate, a pharmaceutical drug used to treat cancer, rheumatoid arthritis, and psoriatic arthritis.

== Career ==
After receiving her Ph.D., she began a postdoctoral microbiology fellowship at the New York University College of Medicine, and was appointed assistant professor there in 1962. In 1963, she joined the Albert Einstein College of Medicine as an assistant professor, and was promoted to associate professor in 1996.

She joined University of Connecticut School of Medicine as professor in 1968, where, as one of the founding members, she helped develop their medical school program. She served as professor of microbiology in the Department of Molecular, Microbial and Structural Biology and remained at the University of Connecticut until her retirement in 2014. While there, she served as a professor of microbiology and of molecular biology and biophysics, and headed the University of Connecticut's Department of Microbiology from 1980 to 2002.

It was during her postdoctoral fellowship that she switched research focus to microbiology, examining the biosynthesis of lipopolysaccharides which contributed to the development of new antibiotics. Lipopolysaccharides, also known as bacterial endotoxin, are large molecules that are abundant on the surfaces of Gram-negative bacteria and contribute to bacterial toxicity and the immune response they provoke.

She used a combination of biochemical experiments, bacterial genetics, and electron microscopy to investigate how bacteria transport lipopolysaccharides from the cellular interior where they are produced to the outer membrane where they reside. This work required the development of a new technique to separate the inner and outer membranes of Gram-negative bacteria, which became known as the Osborn method. She also researched the mechanisms of bacterial cell division.

Later in her career, she pursued an interest in space biology. Osborn worked for NASA and the National Research Council from the mid-1990s through 2008 on lunar and space exploration projects. In this capacity, she chaired NASA's Committee on Space Biology and Medicine, which helped plan U.S. space biology research in the early 2000s.

Osborn served as editor of the journal Biochemistry and the Journal of Biochemistry. She chaired the National Institutes of Health Advisory Council, Division of Research Grants from 1992 to 1994 and served on the Council of the American Society for Biochemistry and Molecular Biology from 1974 to 1975). She was the second woman elected at their president (1981) and also served as president of the Federation of American Societies for Experimental Biology (1982).

== Personal life ==
She married painter Ralph Osborn. She had no children. She was interested in poetry and the arts, including ballet and opera.

Osborn died January 17, 2019, in Farmington, Connecticut, at the age of 91 following complications after emergency surgery.

== Honors and awards ==
Osborn was elected to the American Academy of Arts and Sciences in 1977, the National Academy of Sciences in 1978, and the American Academy of Microbiology in 1992. She was appointed to the National Science Board (governing body of the National Science Foundation) by President Jimmy Carter in 1980.

She was chosen for the Chancellor's Distinguished Lectureship at the University of California, Berkeley in 1982. In 2002, the University of Connecticut Medical School established an annual Osborn Lectureship to honor women scientists.

== Key publications ==
- Huennekens, F. M.; Kay, L. D.; Osborn, M. J.; Hatefi, Y. (August 1, 1957). "Hydroxymethyl Tetrahydrofolic Dehydrogenase". Journal of Biological Chemistry. 227 (2): 637–647. doi:10.1016/S0021-9258(18)70744-8. ISSN 0021-9258. PMID 13462986.
- Osborn, M. J.; Freeman, M.; Huennekens, F. M. (February 1958). "Inhibition of dihydrofolic reductase by aminopterin and amethopterin". Proceedings of the Society for Experimental Biology and Medicine. 97 (2): 429–431. doi:10.3181/00379727-97-23764. ISSN 0037-9727. PMID 13518295. S2CID 26551988.
- Parisi, E.; Gander, J. E.; Osborn, M. J. (June 25, 1972). "Mechanism of Assembly of the Outer Membrane of Salmonella typhimurium – Site of Synthesis of Lipopolysaccharide". Journal of Biological Chemistry. 247 (12): 3973–3986. doi:10.1016/S0021-9258(19)45128-4. ISSN 0021-9258. PMID 4624447.
- Carson, J.; Parisi, E.; Gander, J. E.; Osborn, M. J. (June 25, 1972). "Mechanism of Assembly of the Outer Membrane of Salmonella typhimurium – Isolation and Characterization of Cytoplasmic and Outer Membrane". Journal of Biological Chemistry. 247 (12): 3962–3972. doi:10.1016/S0021-9258(19)45127-2. ISSN 0021-9258. PMID 4555955.
