= Enzyme and Microbial Technology =

- Discipline: Biotechnology
- Language: English
- Edited by: S.W. May

Publication details
- History: 1979-present
- Publisher: Elsevier
- Frequency: 14/year
- Impact factor: 3.705 (2021)

Standard abbreviations
- ISO 4: Enzyme Microb. Technol.

Indexing
- CODEN: EMTED2
- ISSN: 0141-0229 (print); 1879-0909 (web)
- LCCN: 80640780
- OCLC no.: 04815338

Links
- Journal homepage; Online access

Enzyme and Microbial Technology is an international, peer-reviewed journal publishing original research and reviews, of biotechnological significance and novelty, on basic and applied aspects of the science and technology of processes involving the use of enzymes, micro-organisms, animal cells and plant cells.

== Abstracting and indexing ==
The journal is abstracted and indexed in:

- BIOSIS
- Biotechnology Citation Index
- Chemical Abstracts
- Current Contents/Life Sciences
- Derwent Biotechnology Abstracts
- EMBASE
- EMBiology
- Engineering Index
- Science Citation Index
- Scopus

According to the Journal Citation Reports, the journal has a 2021 impact factor of 3.705.
