= Cell Biochemistry & Function =

- Discipline: Biochemistry
- Language: English
- Edited by: Nigel Loveridge

Publication details
- History: 1983–present
- Publisher: Wiley-Blackwell
- Frequency: 8/year
- Impact factor: 2.8 (2023)

Standard abbreviations
- ISO 4: Cell Biochem. Funct.

Indexing
- CODEN: CBFUDH
- ISSN: 0263-6484 (print); 1099-0844 (web)
- OCLC no.: 09500510

Links
- Journal homepage; Online access; Online archive

Cell Biochemistry & Function is a peer-reviewed scientific journal published by Wiley-Blackwell. Its 2023 impact factor is 2.8. The journal was established in 1983 and the full archive is available online. The journal covers research on the molecular and biochemical mechanisms controlling cellular activity.

== Abstracting and indexing ==
Cell Biochemistry & Function is abstracted and indexed in:

- Abstracts on Hygiene and Communicable Diseases
- AgBiotech News and Information
- AgBiotechNet
- Agroforestry Abstracts
- Animal Breeding Abstracts
- Aquatic Sciences & Fisheries Abstracts
- Elsevier BIOBASE
- Biochemistry & Biophysics Citation Index
- Biological Abstracts
- BIOSIS Previews
- Botanical Pesticides
- CAB Abstracts
- CAB HEALTH
- CABDirect
- Cambridge Scientific Abstracts
- Chemical Abstract Services
- Chemoreception Abstracts
- ChemWeb
- Crop Physiology Abstracts
- Biological Sciences Database
- Environmental Sciences & Pollution Management Database
- Current Contents/Life Sciences
- Dairy Science Abstracts
- EMBASE
- EMBiology
- Field Crop Abstracts
- Forest Products Abstracts
- Forestry Abstracts
- Global Health
- Horticultural Science Abstracts
- International Bibliographic Information on Dietary Supplements
- Index Medicus/MEDLINE/PubMed
- Index Veterinarius
- Journal Citation Reports/Science Edition
- Leisure, Recreation and Tourism Abstracts
- Neurosciences Abstracts
- Plant Breeding Abstracts
- Plant Growth Regulator Abstracts
- Poultry Abstracts
- Protozoological Abstracts
- Review of Agricultural Entomology
- Review of Aromatic and Medicinal Plants
- Review of Medical & Veterinary Mycology
- Review of Medical and Veterinary Entomology
- Science Citation Index
- Scopus
- Soybean Abstracts Online
- Tropical Diseases Bulletin
- Veterinary Bulletin
