= Brigid Heywood =

British/Australian academic & biologist

- Born: Kingston upon Hull (Kingdom of Great Britain)
- Education: University of Manchester, University of Liverpool
- Scientific career
- Workplaces: University of New England (2019–2022); University of Tasmania (2015–2019); Massey University (2011–2015); Open University (2005–2011); Keele University (1996–2005); University of Salford (1991–); University of Bath (1987–)
- Thesis: A study of the ultrastructural localization of calcium in the developing odontoblasts of the rat incisor

Brigid R. Heywood (born 1956 or 1957) is a British/Australian academic and biological scientist, who was Vice-Chancellor of the University of New England (UNE) in Australia from 2019 until she resigned after criminal charges were laid against her in 2022.

== Early life and education ==
Heywood is a native of Hull in Northern England. She received a Bachelor of Science degree with honours in biological sciences from the University of Manchester in 1979 and a PhD focused on biomineralisation from the University of Liverpool in 1984.

== Academic career ==
Although she did not have a chemistry degree, Heywood was appointed a professor of chemistry on the strength of her research credentials in 1996 to a personal Chair in Inorganic Materials Chemistry at Keele University in Staffordshire, United Kingdom. She held academic leadership positions as Head of the Chemistry Department (1997–99), Head of the School of Chemistry and Physics (1999-02) and Director of the Office of Research and Enterprise at Keele University from 2003–2005.

Heywood was then appointed Professor of Chemistry at The Open University from 2005-2011. She served as Assistant Vice-Chancellor (Research) at Massey University, New Zealand in 2011, and later Assistant Vice-Chancellor Research, Academic and Enterprise from 2013–2015. She was Deputy Vice-Chancellor (Research) at the University of Tasmania prior to her appointment in 2019 as the 14th Vice-Chancellor of the University of New England (UNE), Australia.

== Resignation and Assault Trial ==
Heywood resigned from her role as Vice Chancellor after she was formally charged with allegedly assaulting a teenage schoolgirl at a club in Armidale on 8 March 2022. UNE accepted her resignation in August 2022.

In May 2025, The Local Court granted her a conditional release under section 10 of the Crimes (Sentencing Procedure) Act 1999 (NSW), meaning no conviction was recorded. The magistrate declined an application to suppress publication of the proceedings. In sentencing, the court noted Heywood’s lack of prior criminal history, expressions of remorse, and the impact of the incident on her professional career, while also recognising the offence caused distress to the complainant.

The trial commenced in May 2025, with Heywood due to face charges of common assault and offensive behaviour. Heywood pleaded guilty to a charge of offensive behaviour. However, before the trial commenced the prosecution agreed to drop the charge of common assault after Heywood agreed to plead guilty. The court heard that at an International Women's Day event in 2022, a 15 year old girl had her picture taken with then Vice Chancellor Heywood. Later during the event Heywood approached the girl and stated, "Oh really, I didn't realise you were brown". She then proceeded to lick her finger and wipe it on the girl's face. Despite the guilty plea, Magistrate Michael Holmes chose to not record a conviction against Heywood. In his remarks Magistrate Holmes described her behaviour as "foolish" and "lacking a good sense of judgement". The magistrate declined an application to suppress publication of the proceedings.

== Scholarly contribution ==
The Guardian newspaper summarises her substantive scholarly focus and contribution as follows: "her research career developed out of the discipline transition from applied biological sciences to materials chemistry fostered by an initial interest in the controlled growth of inorganic crystals in biological systems, biomineralisation. Subsequently, the application of crystal science to issues ranging from normal and dystrophic mineralisation processes, structure-function relationships in inorganic materials, the development of novel strategies to control crystal formation and the formation of novel, functional inorganic-organic hybrids for drug delivery have evolved as key research topics within her multidisciplinary research programme".

In March 2021, Heywood had 72 documents listed in Scopus, with an h index of 33 and 5273 citations.

== Selected publications ==
- R C Walton; J P Kavanagh; Heywood, Brigid; P N Rao (2005). "The association of different urinary proteins with calcium oxalate hydromorphs. Evidence for non-specific interactions". Biochimica et Biophysica Acta. 1723 (1–3): 175–183. doi:10.1016/j.bbagen.2005.02.014. PMID 15863356. Wikidata Q46465601.
- R P Shellis; Heywood, Brigid; F K Wahab (1997). "Formation of brushite, monetite and whitlockite during equilibration of human enamel with acid solutions at 37 degrees C.". Caries Research. 31 (1): 71–77. doi:10.1159/000262377. PMID 8955998. Wikidata Q64998901.
- Bazylinski DA; Frankel RB; Heywood, Brigid; Mann S; King JW; Donaghay PL; Hanson AK (1995). "Controlled Biomineralization of Magnetite (Fe(inf3)O(inf4)) and Greigite (Fe(inf3)S(inf4)) in a Magnetotactic Bacterium". Applied and Environmental Microbiology. 61 (9): 3232–3239. doi:10.1128/aem.61.9.3232-3239.1995. PMC 1388570. PMID 16535116. Wikidata Q34422937.
- Heywood, Brigid (1994). "Biomineralization: new directions in crystal science". Microscopy Research and Technique. 27 (5): 376–388. doi:10.1002/jemt.1070270504. PMID 8018990. Wikidata Q46295513.
- Heywood, Brigid; Sparks NH; Shellis RP; Weiner S; Mann S (1990). "Ultrastructure, morphology and crystal growth of biogenic and synthetic apatites". Connective Tissue Research. 25 (2): 103–119. doi:10.3109/03008209009006985. PMID 2175692. Wikidata Q43601010.
- Mann, Stephen; Heywood, Brigid; Sundara Rajam; J. Derek Birchall (1988). "Controlled crystallization of CaCO3 under stearic acid monolayers". Nature. 334 (6184): 692–695. doi:10.1038/334692a0. Wikidata Q59055341.

== Statutory and board appointments ==
In 2020, Heywood was appointed to the New South Wales (NSW) Innovation and Productivity Council of the NSW Treasury This appointment was made by the Governor of NSW for a three-year term.

On 28 September 2021, she was appointed as a member of the Risk & Audit Committee of the Australian Nuclear Science and Technology Organisation (ANSTO), the home of Australia’s most significant landmark and national infrastructure for research. Heywood's term is scheduled to conclude on 27 September 2025.

== Personal life ==
In 2020, it was reported that Heywood "and her husband enjoy living in New Zealand (where they still own a house) and Australia"; they are often visited by extended family members.

At Armidale Local Court on 26 September 2022, a not guilty plea was entered on behalf of Heywood to charges relating to "common assault and offensive behaviour near a public place or school" on 8 March 2022. The next scheduled court date was 14 November. Heywood did not appear, so the matter was adjourned until 4 July 2023 for a three-day hearing, which Heywood attended and pleaded not guilty. The case was adjourned until 14 July 2023, when Heywood's lawyer was scheduled to appear via video link, to determine whether a further hearing is necessary. The case was postponed until March 2025 and finalised by a different magistrate.
