= Molecular Metabolism =

- Discipline: Metabolism
- Language: English
- Edited by: Stephan Herzig

Publication details
- History: 2018–present
- Publisher: Elsevier (Germany)
- Frequency: Monthly
- Open access: Yes
- Impact factor: 6.6 (2024)

Standard abbreviations
- ISO 4: Mol. Metab.

Indexing
- ISSN: 2212-8778

Links
- Journal homepage; Online archive

Molecular Metabolism is a monthly peer-reviewed open-access journal publishing research articles, reviews and commentaries in the biomedical area, focusing on topics such as energy homeostasis and metabolic disorders. The journal has one of the fastest time frame of peer-review. Since 2018, manuscripts are reviewed and get the first editorial decision in less than one week. According to the Journal Citation Reports, the journal's 2021 impact factor is 8.568.

== Abstracting and indexing ==
The journal is abstracted and indexed in ADONIS, BIOSIS, CAB Abstracts, Chemical Abstracts, Current Contents, EMBASE, EMBiology, MEDLINE, Science Citation Index, Scopus and Toxicology Abstracts.
