= Thecesternus maculosus =

Scientific classification
- Domain: Eukaryota
- Kingdom: Animalia
- Phylum: Arthropoda
- Class: Insecta
- Order: Coleoptera
- Suborder: Polyphaga
- Infraorder: Cucujiformia
- Family: Curculionidae
- Genus: Thecesternus
- Species: T. maculosus

Binomial name
- Thecesternus maculosus Pierce, 1909

Species of beetle

Thecesternus maculosus is a species of broad-nosed weevil in the beetle family Curculionidae. It is found in North America.
