= Thecesternus humeralis =

Scientific classification
- Domain: Eukaryota
- Kingdom: Animalia
- Phylum: Arthropoda
- Class: Insecta
- Order: Coleoptera
- Suborder: Polyphaga
- Infraorder: Cucujiformia
- Family: Curculionidae
- Genus: Thecesternus
- Species: T. humeralis

Binomial name
- Thecesternus humeralis (Say, 1826)

Species of weevil beetle

Thecesternus humeralis is a species of broad-nosed weevil in the beetle family Curculionidae. It is found in North America.
