= Mary Hatten =

American neuroscientist

Mary E. Hatten
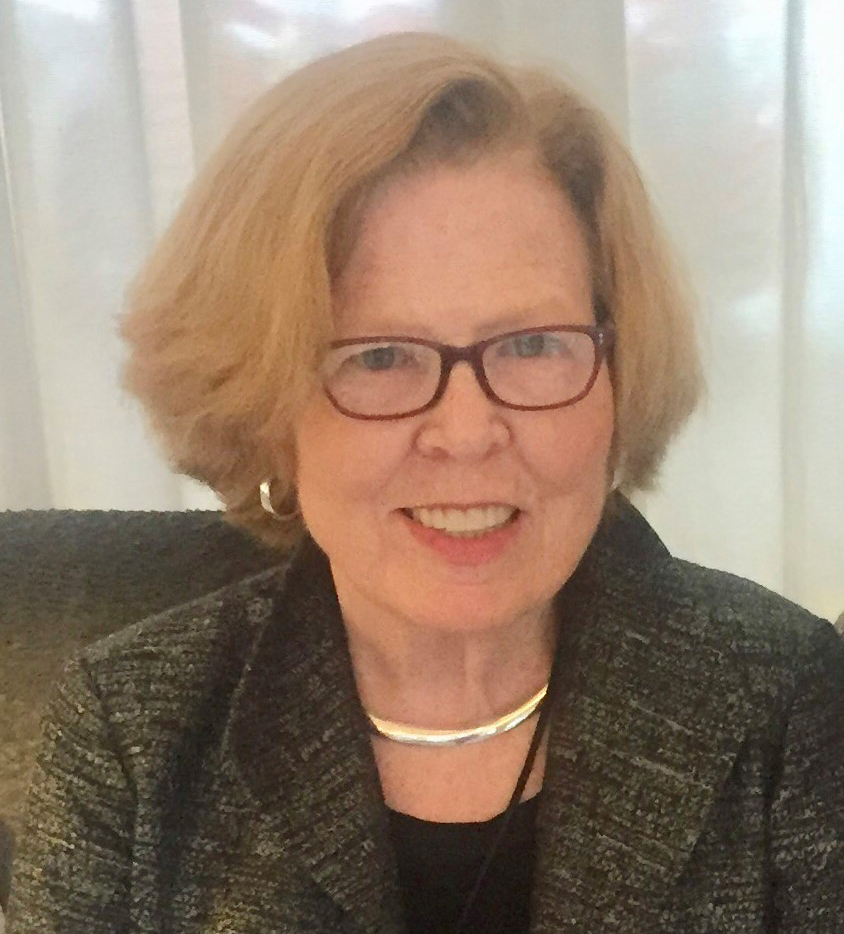
- Born: Mary Elizabeth Hatten; Richmond, Virginia
- Education: Princeton University (PhD) Columbia University College of Physicians and Surgeons (faculty)
- Awards: Member of the National Academy of Sciences (2017)
- Scientific career
- Workplaces: Rockefeller University
- Thesis: The influence of membrane lipids on the lectin-induced agglutination of transformed and untransformed cell lines (1975)
- Website: www.rockefeller.edu/our-scientists/heads-of-laboratories/1180-mary-e-hatten

Mary Elizabeth Hatten is the Frederick P. Rose Professor of neuroscience at the Rockefeller University, where she became the first female full professor in 1992. She studies the manner in which neurons migrate in the brain, which has implications for many neurological diseases, as well as cancer. Her research led to her being elected to the National Academy of Sciences in 2017.

== Early life and education ==
Mary E. Hatten was born in Richmond, Virginia and grew up in Newport News, Virginia. Her father was an obstetrician. During high school and college, Hatten participated in research at the nearby NASA Langley Research Center.

She graduated from Hollins College, a women's college, with a bachelor's degree in chemistry in 1971. In 1975, she earned a PhD from Princeton University, studying cell membrane biophysics with Max Burger, and following him to the University of Basel to finish her degree.

== Career and research ==
After her PhD, Hatten did postdoctoral research with Richard Sidman at Harvard Medical School from 1975 to 1978, studying neuron migration in the developing brain.

Hatten was a professor in the department of pharmacology at the New York University School of Medicine from 1978 to 1986. In 1986, she moved to the Columbia University College of Physicians and Surgeons, where she was a professor until 1992.

In 1992, Hatten became the first female professor at Rockefeller University.

Using the cerebral cortices of mice as a model, Hatten's research focuses on the development of complex cellular architecture in the mammal brain, studying how neurons migrate and differentiate. Her research has implications for the genetics of brain disease, autism spectrum disorders (ASDs), attention deficit disorder (ADD), childhood epilepsy, and medulloblastoma, a type of childhood brain cancer.

The Hatten lab has been a pioneer in the study of receptor proteins and in the use of video imaging. Hatten discovered the neuron-glial adhesion protein astrotactin (ASTN1), a receptor critical for glial-guided migration. In 2018, Hatten and her colleagues conducted research on ASTN2, demonstrating that it helps move proteins away from the neuron's membrane in a timely fashion. The researchers also proposed a mechanism by which ASTN2 plays a role in defecting lead to neurodevelopmental disorders such as ASD and intellectual disabilities. In conducting her research, the Hatten lab spearheaded the use of video imaging methods in viewing the dynamics of CNS neuronal migration along glial fibers. Hatten became a co-editor of the Annual Review of Neuroscience in 2024.

=== Awards and honors ===
- 1988 Pew Neuroscience Award
- 1991 National Science Foundation Faculty Award for Women Scientists
- 1996 Weil Award of the American Association of Neuropathologists
- 2017 Ralph W. Gerard Prize in Neuroscience
- 2017 Elected Member of the National Academy of Sciences
- 2021 Elected Member of National Academy of Medicine (2021)

== Selected publications ==
- Hatten, M.E. (1985). Neuronal regulation of astroglial morphology and proliferation in vitro. Journal of Cell Biology 100(2), 384-396. doi:10.1083/jcb.100.2.384
- Hatten, M.E. (1999). Central nervous system neuronal migration. Annual Review of Neuroscience 22, 511-539. doi:10.1146/annurev.neuro.22.1.511
- Shiaoching, G., Doughty, M., Harbaugh, C.R., Cummins, A., Hatten, M.E., Heintz, N., Gerfen, C.R. (2007). Targeting Cre Recombinase to Specific Neuron Populations with Bacterial Artificial Chromosome Constructs. Journal of Neuroscience 27(37), 9817-9823. DOI: https://doi.org/10.1523/JNEUROSCI.2707-07.2007
