= Annals of Allergy, Asthma & Immunology =

Annals of Allergy, Asthma and Immunology
- Discipline: Immunology
- Language: English
- Edited by: Mitchell H. Grayson

Publication details
- Former name: Annals of Allergy
- History: 1943-present
- Publisher: Elsevier on behalf of the American College of Allergy, Asthma and Immunology
- Frequency: Monthly
- Impact factor: 7.1 (2025)

Standard abbreviations
- ISO 4: Ann. Allergy Asthma Immunol.

Indexing
- CODEN: ALAIF6
- ISSN: 1081-1206 (print); 1534-4436 (web)

Links
- Journal homepage; Online access; Online archive

The Annals of Allergy, Asthma, & Immunology is a monthly peer-reviewed medical journal covering allergy, asthma, and immunology. The journal was established in 1943 under the name Annals of Allergy, obtaining its current name in 1995. The journal is published by Elsevier on behalf of the American College of Allergy, Asthma and Immunology, of which it is the official journal. The editor-in-chief is Mitchell H. Grayson, MD (Nationwide Children's Hospital and The Ohio State University). According to the journal's website, the journal has a 2025 impact factor of 7.1.
