= Thecesternus =

- Thecesternus affinis

Scientific classification
- Kingdom: Animalia
- Phylum: Arthropoda
- Clade: Pancrustacea
- Class: Insecta
- Order: Coleoptera
- Suborder: Polyphaga
- Infraorder: Cucujiformia
- Superfamily: Curculionoidea
- Family: Curculionidae
- Subfamily: Entiminae
- Tribe: Thecesternini
- Genus: Thecesternus; Say, 1831

Genus of beetles

Thecesternus is a genus of broad-nosed weevils in the beetle family Curculionidae. There are about seven described species in Thecesternus.

== Species ==
These seven species belong to the genus Thecesternus:

- Thecesternus affinis (LeConte, 1857)^{i c g}
- Thecesternus albidus Pierce, 1909^{i c g}
- Thecesternus foveolatus Pierce, 1909^{i c g}
- Thecesternus hirsutus Pierce, 1909^{i c g}
- Thecesternus humeralis (Say, 1826)^{i c g b}
- Thecesternus longior (LeConte, 1857)^{i c g}
- Thecesternus maculosus Pierce, 1909^{i c g b}

Data sources: i = ITIS, c = Catalogue of Life, g = GBIF, b = Bugguide.net
