= Annual Review of Neuroscience =

- Discipline: Neuroscience
- Language: English
- Edited by: Mary E. Hatten, Botond Roska

Publication details
- History: 1978–present, 48 years old
- Publisher: Annual Reviews (US)
- Frequency: Annually
- Open access: Subscribe to Open
- Impact factor: 13.8 (2025)

Standard abbreviations
- ISO 4: Annu. Rev. Neurosci.

Indexing
- CODEN: ARNSD5
- ISSN: 0147-006X (print); 1545-4126 (web)
- OCLC no.: 57214750

Links
- Journal homepage

The Annual Review of Neuroscience is a peer-reviewed academic journal that publishes review articles relevant to neuroscience. In publication since 1978 by Annual Reviews (AR), founding editor W. Maxwell Cowan led the editorial committee until his death in 2002. Mary E. Hatten and Botond Roska are the current co-editors. As of 2023, it is being published as open access, under the Subscribe to Open model.

== History ==
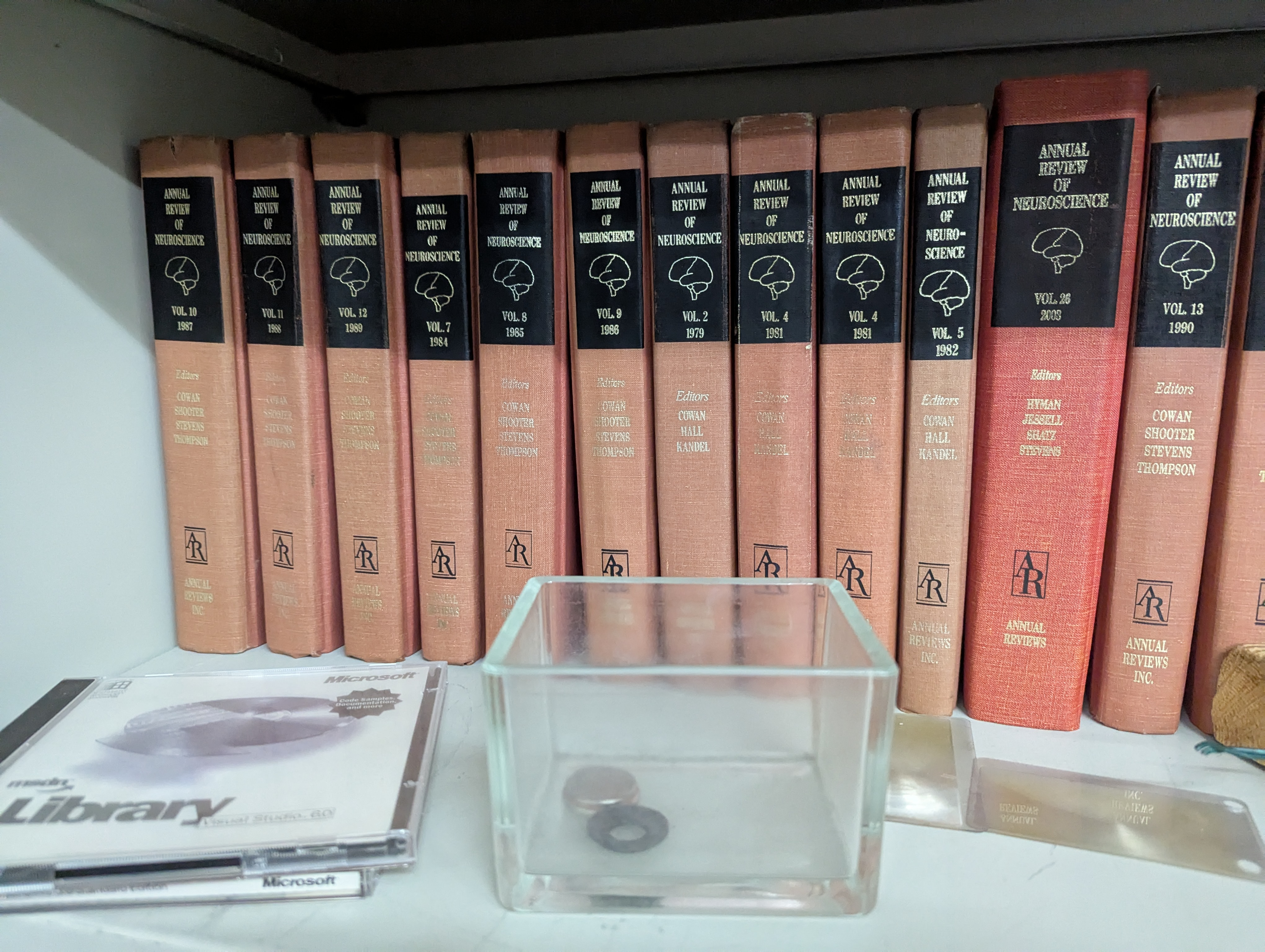
Early volumes of the Annual Review of Neuroscience

Annual Reviews (AR) is a nonprofit organization whose stated mission is to synthesize knowledge "for the progress of science and the benefit of society." In 1975, AR had two meetings in New York to coincide with the annual meeting of the Society for Neuroscience. In the meetings, neuroscientists from the US and Canada concurred that it would be useful to establish a journal that published an annual volume of review articles relevant to neuroscience. AR's board of directors of gave the final approval for the journal in early 1976, appointing the first editorial committee with W. Maxwell Cowan appointed editor. In April 1976 the editorial committee planned the first volume of the journal, which was published in 1978. As of 2021, it was published both in print and electronically. Some of its articles are available online in advance of the volume's publication date.

== Scope and indexing ==
The Annual Review of Neuroscience defines its scope as covering significant developments in the field of neuroscience, including the subfields of molecular neuroscience, cellular neuroscience, neurodevelopment, neurogenetics, neuroplasticity, systems neuroscience, neurological disorders, and the history and ethics of neuroscience. As of 2026, Journal Citation Reports lists the journal's 2025 impact factor as 13.8, ranking it tenth of 330 journal titles in the category "Neurosciences". It is abstracted and indexed in Scopus, CAB Abstracts, EMBASE, MEDLINE, PsycINFO, and Academic Search, among others.

== Editorial processes ==
The Annual Review of Neuroscience is helmed by the editor or the co-editors. The editor is assisted by the editorial committee, which includes associate editors, regular members, and occasionally guest editors. Guest members participate at the invitation of the editor, and serve terms of one year. All other members of the editorial committee are appointed by the AR board of directors and serve five-year terms. The editorial committee determines which topics should be included in each volume and solicits reviews from qualified authors. Unsolicited manuscripts are not accepted. Peer review of accepted manuscripts is undertaken by the editorial committee.

=== Editors of volumes ===
Dates indicate publication years in which someone was credited as a lead editor or co-editor of a journal volume. The planning process for a volume begins well before the volume appears, so appointment to the position of lead editor generally occurred prior to the first year shown here. An editor who has retired or died may be credited as a lead editor of a volume that they helped to plan, even if it is published after their retirement or death.

- W. Maxwell Cowan (1978–2002)
- Steven E. Hyman (2003–2017)
- Huda Y. Zoghbi (2018–2019)
- Zoghbi and Botond Roska (2020-2024)
- Roska and Mary E. Hatten (2025-)

=== Current editorial committee ===
As of 2024, the editorial committee consists of two co-editors and the following members:

- Mark L. Andermann
- Rui M. Costa
- Peter Dayan
- Gordon Fishell
- Hailan Hu
- Michelle Monje Deisseroth
- Michael N. Shadlen
- Catherine S. Woolley

== See also ==
- List of neuroscience journals
