= Open Life Sciences =

- Discipline: Biology
- Language: English

Publication details
- Former name: Central European Journal of Biology
- History: 2006–present
- Publisher: Walter de Gruyter
- Frequency: Continuous
- Open access: Yes
- License: Creative Commons-BY-NC-ND
- Impact factor: 2.2 (2022)

Standard abbreviations
- ISO 4: Open Life Sci.

Indexing
- CODEN: OLSPBT
- ISSN: 2391-5412
- LCCN: 2015247750
- OCLC no.: 907772243
- Central European Journal of Biology
- ISSN: 1895-104X (print); 1644-3632 (web)

Links
- Journal homepage; Journal homepage at Springer

Open Life Sciences is a peer-reviewed open access scientific journal covering all areas of the life sciences. It was established in 2006 as the Central European Journal of Biology and co-published by Versita and Springer Science+Business Media. It obtained its current title in 2014 when it was moved completely to the De Gruyter imprint, at the same time switching to full open access. The founding editor-in-chief was Mariusz Ratajczak (University of Louisville). The current editor-in-chief is Thomas Litman (University of Copenhagen).

== Abstracting and indexing ==
The journals is abstracted and indexed in:

- AGRICOLA
- Biological Abstracts
- BIOSIS Previews
- CAB Direct
- Chemical Abstracts Service
- Current Contents/Agriculture, Biology, and Environmental Sciences
- Elsevier Biobase
- EMBiology
- GeoRef
- Global Health
- ProQuest
- Science Citation Index Expanded
- Scopus
- The Zoological Record
- Web of Science
- PubMed

According to the Journal Citation Reports, the journal has a 2019 impact factor of 0.690.
