= Journal of Biotechnology =

- Discipline: Biotechnology
- Language: English
- Edited by: A. Pühler

Publication details
- History: 1984-present
- Publisher: Elsevier
- Frequency: 24/year
- Impact factor: 3.163 (2018)

Standard abbreviations
- ISO 4: J. Biotechnol.

Indexing
- CODEN: JBITD4
- ISSN: 0168-1656 (print); 1873-4863 (web)
- LCCN: sn84012185
- OCLC no.: 10884769

Links
- Journal homepage; Online access

Journal of Biotechnology is a peer-reviewed scientific journal covering research ranging from genetic and molecular biological positions to biochemical, chemical, or bioprocess engineering aspects as well as research on the computer application of new software concepts which are directly relevant to biotechnology.

== Abstracting and indexing ==
The journal is abstracted and indexed in BIOSIS, Cambridge Scientific Abstracts, Chemical Abstracts, Current Contents/Agriculture, Biology & Environmental Sciences, EMBASE, EMBiology, MEDLINE, and Scopus.
