= Botond Roska =

Hungarian researcher

- Born: December 17, 1969 (age 56); Budapest
- Citizenship: Hungary
- Education: Franz Liszt Academy of Music; Eötvös Loránd University; Semmelweis University; University of California, Berkeley
- Children: 3
- Awards: W. Alden Spencer Award (2018); Wolf Prize in Medicine 2024
- Scientific career
- Workplaces: Friedrich Miescher Institute for Biomedical Research; University of Basel

Botond Miklós Roska (born 1969) is a Hungarian medical doctor and biomedical researcher. Much of his research is on the pathways of visual perception and how to treat diseases that cause blindness.

== Early life and education ==
Botond Roska was born in 1969 in Budapest, Hungary. His mother was a musician and his father, Tamás Roska, was a computer scientist. He learned to play the cello and studied at the Franz Liszt Academy of Music from 1985 to 1989. After a hand injury ended his cello career, he decided to study medicine and mathematics instead. He studied mathematics at Eötvös Loránd University from 1991 to 1995. He received a Doctor of Medicine from Semmelweis University in 1995 and then a PhD in neurobiology at the University of California, Berkeley.

== Career ==
After finishing his PhD, Roska researched genetics and virology through the Harvard Society of Fellows at Harvard University and its medical school. He then went to Basel, Switzerland to establish a research group at the Friedrich Miescher Institute for Biomedical Research. In 2010 he joined the faculty at the University of Basel. He is the founding director of the Institute for Molecular and Clinical Ophthalmology Basel (IOB) in Switzerland and an advisor for the Allen Institute. He has been co-editor of the Annual Review of Neuroscience with Huda Zoghbi since 2017.

Much of Roska's research is on visual perception, including its principles and the pathways of information processing. He also researches therapies to combat visual dysfunction and restore sight to those who are visually impaired. In 2018 his research team succeeded in growing a functional, artificial retina in a laboratory.

== Awards and honors ==
In 2019 he was awarded the Semmelweis Budapest Award, which is the highest award given by Semmelweis University. Also in 2019 he received the Hungarian Order of Saint Stephen, the highest order of Hungary, and the Louis-Jeantet Prize for Medicine. In 2020 he won, as third time to hungarians, the Körber European Science Prize for his research on a gene therapy that could potentially be used to reactivate the retinae of individuals who are blind. In 2024 he was awarded the Wolf Prize in Medicine jointly with José-Alain Sahel for sight-saving and vision restoration to blind people using optogenetics.

== Personal life ==
Roska enjoys listening to the music of Bach and writing mathematical proofs.
