= Retrovirology (journal) =

- Discipline: Retrovirology
- Language: English
- Edited by: Johnson Mak, Susan Ross

Publication details
- History: 2004-present
- Publisher: BioMed Central
- Open access: Yes
- License: Creative Commons Attribution 4.0
- Impact factor: 4.183 (2019)

Standard abbreviations
- ISO 4: Retrovirology

Indexing
- CODEN: RETRBO
- ISSN: 1742-4690
- LCCN: 2004243415
- OCLC no.: 54798617

Links
- Journal homepage; Online archive

Retrovirology is a peer-reviewed open access scientific journal covering basic research on retroviruses. The journal was established in 2004 and is published by BioMed Central. The editors-in-chief are Johnson Mak (Griffith University, Australia) and Susan Ross (University of Illinois at Chicago); earlier, Kuan-Teh Jeang was editor-in-chief.

== Abstracting and indexing ==
The journal is abstracted and indexed in:

- Biological Abstracts
- BIOSIS Previews
- Chemical Abstracts Service
- Current Contents/Life Sciences
- Embase
- EMBiology
- Global Health
- Index Medicus/MEDLINE/PubMed
- Science Citation Index
- Scopus

According to the Journal Citation Reports, the journal has a 2019 impact factor of 4.183, ranking it 10th out of 37 journals in the category "Virology".
