= Genetica =

- Discipline: Genetics, evolutionary biology
- Language: English
- Edited by: Juan L Bouzat

Publication details
- History: 1919-present
- Publisher: Springer Science+Business Media
- Frequency: Monthly
- Open access: Hybrid
- Impact factor: 2.148 (2011)

Standard abbreviations
- ISO 4: Genetica

Indexing
- CODEN: GENEA3
- ISSN: 0016-6707 (print); 1573-6857 (web)
- LCCN: 23013908
- OCLC no.: 704024115

Links
- Journal homepage; Online access

Genetica is a peer-reviewed scientific journal covering research in genetics and evolutionary biology. It was established in January 1919 by Kluwer Academic (which later merged into Springer) and originally published articles in English, Dutch, French, and German. Publication was suspended from 1944 to 1946. The journal allows self-archiving and authors can pay extra for open access. The current editor-in-chief is Juan L Bouzat.

== Abstracting and indexing ==
The journal is abstracted and indexed in:

- Science Citation Index
- PubMed/MEDLINE
- Scopus
- EMBASE
- Chemical Abstracts Service
- Academic OneFile
- AGRICOLA
- Biological Abstracts
- BIOSIS Previews
- Biotechnology Citation Index
- CAB Abstracts
- Current Contents/Life Sciences
- Elsevier BIOBASE
- EMBiology
- INIS Atomindex
- The Zoological Record

According to the Journal Citation Reports, the journal has a 2011 impact factor of 2.148.
