= W. Maxwell Cowan =

South African-American neurobiologist and neuro-anatomist (1931–2002)

- Born: 27 September 1931
- Died: 30 June 2002 (aged 70)
- Alma mater: University of the Witwatersrand; University of Oxford
- Occupation: Neurobiologist
- Employer: Howard Hughes Medical Institute (1984–2000); Johns Hopkins University; Salk Institute for Biological Studies (1980–1986); University of Texas Southwestern Medical Center; University of Wisconsin–Madison (1966–1968); Washington University School of Medicine (1968–)
- Awards: Karl Spencer Lashley Award (1984); Ralph W. Gerard Prize in Neuroscience (2001); Fellow of the Royal Society

William Maxwell Cowan (27 September 1931 – 30 June 2002) was a South African neuroscientist known for his work on developmental plasticity and neural connectivity. He is credited with helping to contribute to the growth of modern neuroanatomy through his use of novel anterograde tracing techniques which fundamentally transformed the field in the 1970s. From 1978–2002 Cowan was the founding editor of the Annual Review of Neuroscience. Cowan was vice-president and chief scientific officer of the Howard Hughes Medical Institute from 1987 until his retirement in 2000.

== Early life and education ==
William Maxwell Cowan was born to Scottish parents in Johannesburg, South Africa, on 27 September 1931. In the 1920s, Cowan's family, who previously worked in the shipbuilding industry in Scotland, emigrated to South Africa to look for mining jobs in Transvaal Province after the British government closed many of their shipyards in Glasgow during a peacetime downturn. Growing up in Johannesburg, Cowan attended Germiston High School and graduated at the age of 15. Cowan was unsure as to what he would do after graduation, as nobody in his family had ever attended university. It was decided that he would apprentice at a local law firm and attend law school part time. However, when the firm discovered how young he was, they asked Cowan's family to enroll him at University of the Witwatersrand for at least one year, where he would study prelaw with the goal of specialising in real estate law.

Cowan's interest in a legal career that first year soon waned, and he became more aware and troubled by the inequality between whites and blacks in South African society. He decided to change careers and study medicine instead when a friend of the family recommended it as way for him to dedicate his life to serving the community. He studied medicine at the University of the Witwatersrand (1951, BSc), several years prior to Sydney Brenner, whom he met at the school. In 1953, at the recommendation of anthropologist Raymond Dart, Cowan went on to Hertford College, Oxford, to study neuroanatomy and perform doctoral research under Wilfrid Le Gros Clark, earning his DPhil (1956) and his BM BCh (1958).

== Academic career ==
Cowan lectured in anatomy at Pembroke College, Oxford, from 1958 to 1966. He became associate professor at the University of Wisconsin–Madison for two years, from 1966 to 1968, and then moved to the Washington University in St. Louis, where he headed and created the Department of Anatomy and Neurobiology at the Washington University School of Medicine from 1968 to 1980. According to Steven E. Hyman, Cowan built the department "into one of the most important early intellectual centers for neuroscience research." Cowan became director of developmental neurobiology at the Salk Institute for Biological Studies from 1980 to 1986, until he returned to Washington University as provost and executive vice-chancellor.

== Howard Hughes Medical Institute ==
Cowan became a member of the Medical Advisory Board for the Howard Hughes Medical Institute (HHMI) in 1984. The institute privately funds biomedical research and employs hundreds of scientists. He became vice-president and chief scientific officer at HHMI in 1987, holding the post until his retirement in 2000.

== Journal editor ==
Cowan helped establish neuroscience in the 1960s as an interdisciplinary enterprise. As managing editor of The Journal of Comparative Neurology from 1968 to 1980, it became a leading source for neuroscience research. Cowan was also editor-in-chief of The Journal of Neuroscience from its founding in 1980 through 1987.

== Personal life ==
Cowan married school teacher Margaret Sherlock and they had two sons and one daughter. He signed his work as "W. Maxwell Cowan", but his friends called him "Max". Cowan was known for his scientific abilities and his communication skills, his "big-picture" thinking, and his leadership qualities. He influenced and mentored many fellow scientists, helping to encourage their careers. After coping with prostate cancer, Cowan died at home in Rockville, Maryland, at age 70.

== Awards and honors ==
- Member of the American Academy of Arts and Sciences (1976)
- Member of the National Academy of Sciences (1981)
- Karl Spencer Lashley Award, American Philosophical Society (1984)

== Selected publications ==
For an extensive, but selective bibliography of scientific papers by Cowan, see The History of Neuroscience in Autobiography (2004), pp. 198–208.

=== As author ===
- Cowan, W.M.; Gottlieb, D.I.; Hendrickson, A.E.; Price, J. L.; Woolsey, T.A. 1972. "The autoradio-graphic demonstration of axonal connections in the central nervous system." Brain Research, 37 (1): 21–51. doi:10.1016/0006-8993(72)90344-7 (subscription required)

=== As editor ===
- Studies in Developmental Neurobiology: Essays in Honor of Viktor Hamburger (1981)
- Synapses (2000)

== See also ==
- Dana Alliance for Brain Initiatives
- Geoffrey Raisman, Cowan's only graduate student at Oxford
