= Thecesternini =

- Thecesternus affinis

Scientific classification
- Kingdom: Animalia
- Phylum: Arthropoda
- Clade: Pancrustacea
- Class: Insecta
- Order: Coleoptera
- Suborder: Polyphaga
- Infraorder: Cucujiformia
- Superfamily: Curculionoidea
- Family: Curculionidae
- Subfamily: Entiminae
- Tribe: Thecesternini; Lacordaire, 1863

Genera
- See text

Tribe of beetles

Thecesternini is a weevil tribe in the subfamily Entiminae.

== Genera ==
Arodenius – Cyphomastax – Herpes - Thecesternus
