= MRPS18A =

Protein-coding gene in the species Homo sapiens

Identifiers
- Aliases: MRPS18A, HumanS18b, MRP-S18-3, MRPS18-3, S18bmt, mitochondrial ribosomal protein S18A, S18mt-a, MRP-S18-a
- External IDs: OMIM: 611981; MGI: 1915815; GeneCards: MRPS18A
Available structures
PDB	Ortholog search: PDBe RCSB
PDB	List of PDB id codes 3J7Y, 3J9M

Gene location (Human)
Chr.	Chromosome 6 (human)
Band	6p21.1	Start	43,671,202 bp
Band	6p21.1	End	43,687,791 bp

Gene location (Mouse)
Chr.	Chromosome 17 (mouse)
Band	17|17 C	Start	46,421,912 bp
Band	17|17 C	End	46,439,836 bp
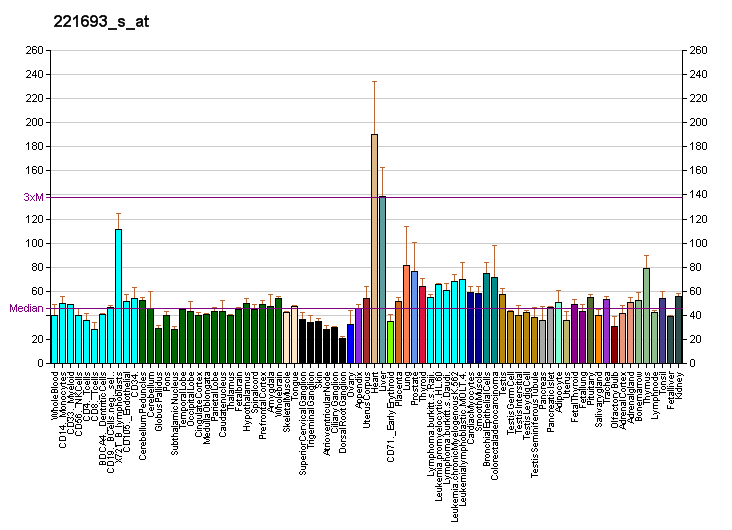

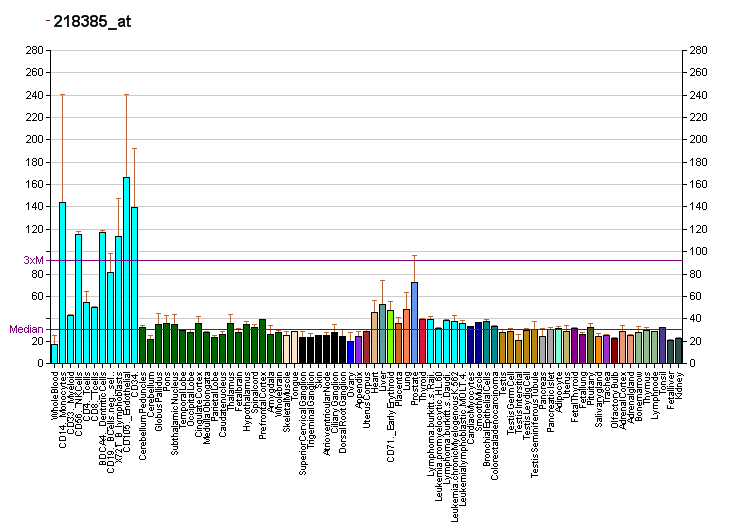
RNA expression pattern
Bgee	Human / Mouse (ortholog); Top expressed in: gastrocnemius muscle; muscle of thigh; mucosa of transverse colon; apex of heart; body of stomach; rectum; left ventricle; endothelial cell; right adrenal gland; right lobe of liver / Top expressed in: seminal vesicula; yolk sac; right kidney; interventricular septum; soleus muscle; right ventricle; intercostal muscle; digastric muscle; muscle of thigh; temporal muscle; More reference expression data
BioGPS	More reference expression data
Gene ontology
Molecular function	structural constituent of ribosome; small ribosomal subunit rRNA binding
Cellular component	mitochondrial inner membrane; ribosome; intracellular anatomical structure; mitochondrion; mitochondrial small ribosomal subunit; cytosolic small ribosomal subunit; mitochondrial large ribosomal subunit
Biological process	mitochondrial translational elongation; mitochondrial translational termination; protein biosynthesis; mitochondrial translation
Sources:Amigo / QuickGO
Orthologs
Databases	NCBI: entry; OMA: entry
Species	Human	Mouse
Entrez	55168	68565
Ensembl	ENSG00000096080	ENSMUSG00000023967
UniProt	Q9NVS2	Q99N85
RefSeq (mRNA)	NM_001193343; NM_018135	NM_026768
RefSeq (protein)	NP_001180272; NP_060605	NP_081044
Location (UCSC)	Chr 6: 43.67 – 43.69 Mb	Chr 17: 46.42 – 46.44 Mb
PubMed search
- Wikidata
View/Edit Human	View/Edit Mouse

28S ribosomal protein S18a, mitochondrial is a protein that in humans is encoded by the MRPS18A gene.

Mammalian mitochondrial ribosomal proteins are encoded by nuclear genes and help in protein synthesis within the mitochondrion. Mitochondrial ribosomes (mitoribosomes) consist of a small 28S subunit and a large 39S subunit. They have an estimated 75% protein to rRNA composition compared to prokaryotic ribosomes, where this ratio is reversed. Another difference between mammalian mitoribosomes and prokaryotic ribosomes is that the latter contain a 5S rRNA. Among different species, the proteins comprising the mitoribosome differ greatly in sequence, and sometimes in biochemical properties, which prevents easy recognition by sequence homology. This gene encodes a 28S subunit protein that belongs to the ribosomal protein S18P family. The encoded protein is one of three that has significant sequence similarity to bacterial S18 proteins. The primary sequences of the three human mitochondrial S18 proteins are no more closely related to each other than they are to the prokaryotic S18 proteins. A pseudogene corresponding to this gene is found on chromosome 3p.
