= Biomedical Microdevices =

- Discipline: Engineering
- Language: English
- Edited by: Alessandro Grattoni and Arum Han

Publication details
- History: 1998–present
- Publisher: Springer Science+Business Media
- Frequency: Bimonthly
- Impact factor: 3.783 (2021)

Standard abbreviations
- ISO 4: Biomed. Microdevices

Indexing
- CODEN: BMICFC
- ISSN: 1387-2176 (print); 1572-8781 (web)
- LCCN: 00244963
- OCLC no.: 901010062

Links
- Journal homepage; Online archive

Biomedical Microdevices is a bimonthly peer-reviewed scientific journal covering applications of Bio-MEMS (Microelectromechanical systems) and biomedical nanotechnology. It is published by Springer Science+Business Media and the editor-in-chief are Alessandro Grattoni (Houston Methodist Research Institute) and Arum Han (Texas A&M University).

== Abstracting and indexing ==
The journal is abstracted/indexed in:

- Chemical Abstracts Service
- CINAHL
- Current Contents/Engineering, Computing & Technology
- EBSCO databases
- Ei Compendex
- Index Medicus/MEDLINE/PubMed
- Embase
- Inspec
- ProQuest databases
- Science Citation Index Expanded
- Scopus

According to the Journal Citation Reports, the journal has a 2021 impact factor of 3.783.
