= Neurotoxicity Research =

- Discipline: Toxicology, neuroscience
- Language: English

Publication details
- History: 1999-present
- Publisher: Springer Science+Business Media
- Frequency: 8/year
- Impact factor: 3.538 (2014)

Standard abbreviations
- ISO 4: Neurotox. Res.

Indexing
- CODEN: NURRFI
- ISSN: 1029-8428 (print); 1476-3524 (web)
- OCLC no.: 50166444

Links
- Journal homepage; Online archive

Neurotoxicity Research is a peer-reviewed academic journal covering the study of neurotoxins. It was established in 1999 and is published eight times per year by Springer Science+Business Media. It is the official journal of the Neurotoxicity Society. The editor-in-chief is Richard M. Kostrzewa (East Tennessee State University). According to the Journal Citation Reports, the journal has a 2014 impact factor of 3.538.
