= Journal of Liposome Research =

- Discipline: Drug Delivery
- Language: English
- Edited by: Yvonne Perrie

Publication details
- History: 1988-present
- Publisher: Informa Healthcare (UK)
- Frequency: Quarterly
- Impact factor: 2.455 (2019)

Standard abbreviations
- ISO 4: J. Liposome Res.

Indexing
- ISSN: 0898-2104 (print); 1532-2394 (web)

Links
- Journal homepage

The Journal of Liposome Research is a peer-reviewed academic journal that publishes original research on the topics of liposomes and related systems, lipid-based delivery systems, lipid biology, and both synthetic and physical lipid chemistry. The journal also publishes special issues focusing on particular topics and themes within the general scope of the journal and abstracts and conference proceedings including those from the International Liposome Society. The journal is owned by Informa plc.
