= Theoretical Biology and Medical Modelling =

- Discipline: Mathematical and theoretical biology Medicine
- Language: English
- Edited by: Hiroshi Nishiura

Publication details
- History: 2004–2021
- Publisher: BioMed Central
- Open access: Yes
- Impact factor: 2.432 (2021)

Standard abbreviations
- ISO 4: Theor. Biol. Med. Model.

Indexing
- ISSN: 1742-4682
- LCCN: 2004243547
- OCLC no.: 780388361

Links
- Journal homepage; Online archive

Theoretical Biology and Medical Modelling is a peer-reviewed online-only medical journal covering mathematical and theoretical biology, as well as on applications of mathematics in the field of medicine. It was established in 2004 and is published by BioMed Central. The editor-in-chief is Prof. Hiroshi Nishiura (Kyoto University). According to the Journal Citation Reports, the journal has a 2021 impact factor of 2.432. The journal was ceased to be published by BioMed Central as of 31 December 2021.
