= Biotechnology and Bioprocess Engineering =

- Discipline: Biotechnology
- Language: English
- Edited by: Jong Won Yun and Sang Yup Lee

Publication details
- History: 1996–present
- Publisher: Springer Science+Business Media
- Frequency: Bimonthly
- Impact factor: 3.386 (2021)

Standard abbreviations
- ISO 4: Biotechnol. Bioprocess Eng.

Indexing
- ISSN: 1226-8372 (print); 1976-3816 (web)
- LCCN: 2006243746
- OCLC no.: 300646836

Links
- Journal homepage

Biotechnology and Bioprocess Engineering is a peer-reviewed bimonthly scientific journal published by Springer Science+Business Media on behalf of the Korean Society for Biotechnology and Bioengineering. Biotechnology and Bioprocess Engineering covers all aspects of biotechnology and bioengineering. The editor-in-chief of the journal is Jong Won Yun (Daegu University) and Sang Yup Lee (KAIST). The founding editors-in-chief were Cha-Yong Choi (Seoul National University), Ho Nam Chang (Korea Advanced Institute of Science and Technology), and Sun Bok Lee (POSTECH).

== Abstracting and indexing ==
The journal is abstracted and indexed in EMBASE, EMBiology, Food Science and Technology Abstracts, IBIDS, International Abstracts in Operations Research, Science Citation Index Expanded, and Scopus. According to the Journal Citation Reports, its 2021 impact factor is 3.386
