= Advances in Microbial Physiology =

- Discipline: Microbiology
- Language: English
- Edited by: Robert K. Poole and David J. Kelly

Publication details
- History: 1967—present
- Publisher: Academic Press
- Frequency: Biannually
- Impact factor: 4.731 (2021)

Standard abbreviations
- ISO 4: Adv. Microb. Physiol.

Indexing
- CODEN: AMIPB2
- ISSN: 0065-2911
- LCCN: 67-19850
- OCLC no.: 01461218

Links
- Journal homepage

Advances in Microbial Physiology is a biannual peer-reviewed scientific journal covering microbiology. It was established in 1967 and is published by Academic Press. The founding editors-in-chief were Anthony H. Rose and John Frome Wilkinson; the current editors are Robert K. Poole and David J. Kelly (University of Sheffield). Each issue is also published as a book with a separate ISBN. The articles are reviews covering all aspects of microbial physiology in its broadest sense, i.e. how microbes "work" and include coverage of bacteria, archaea, fungi and algae. Reviews are usually solicited from authors by invitation from the editors.

== Abstracting and indexing ==
The journal is abstracted and indexed, for example, in:

- Index Medicus/MEDLINE/PubMed,
- Chemical Abstracts Service
- Science Citation Index
- Scopus
- BIOSIS Previews

According to the Journal Citation Reports, the journal has a 2021 impact factor of 4.731.
