= African Journal of Neurological Sciences =

- Discipline: Neurology
- Language: English, French
- Edited by: Gilbert Dechambenoit

Publication details
- History: 1982–present
- Publisher: Pan African Association of Neurological Sciences
- Frequency: Biannually

Standard abbreviations
- ISO 4: Afr. J. Neurol. Sci.

Indexing
- ISSN: 1015-8618 (print); 1992-2647 (web)
- LCCN: sf93094154
- OCLC no.: 52926973

Links
- Journal homepage; Online access; Online archive

The African Journal of Neurological Sciences is a biannual peer-reviewed medical journal published by the Pan African Association of Neurological Sciences, covering all aspects of neurology. The editor-in-chief is Gilbert Dechambenoit. The journal is abstracted and indexed in Scopus.
