= European Pharmaceutical Journal =

- Discipline: Pharmacy
- Language: English

Publication details
- Former name: Acta Facultatis Pharmaceuticae Universitatis Comenianae
- History: 2011–present
- Publisher: Walter de Gruyter
- Frequency: Biannually
- Open access: Yes
- License: Creative Commons-BY-NC-ND

Standard abbreviations
- ISO 4: Eur. Pharm. J.

Indexing
- ISSN: 1338-6786

Links
- Journal homepage

European Pharmaceutical Journal (formerly Acta Facultatis Pharmaceuticae Universitatis Comenianae) is a biannual peer-reviewed open access scientific journal covering all areas of pharmacy. The editor in chief is Juraj Piešťanský (Comenius University). It is an official journal of Comenius University. In 2014 it was moved to the De Gruyter Open imprint and switched to full open access.

== Abstracting and indexing ==
The journals is abstracted and indexed in:

- Chemical Abstracts Service
- EBSCO databases
- ProQuest databases
- SCOPUS
