= Human Genomics and Proteomics =

- Discipline: Genomics
- Language: English
- Edited by: George P. Patrinos, Emanuel F. Petricoin

Publication details
- History: 2009-2011
- Publisher: SAGE Publications
- Open access: Yes

Standard abbreviations
- ISO 4: Hum. Genom. Proteom.

Indexing
- ISSN: 1757-4242
- LCCN: 2009243792
- OCLC no.: 502418829

Links
- Journal homepage; Online access; Online archive

Human Genomics and Proteomics was an open-access peer-reviewed academic journal that published papers in the fields of human genomics and proteomics, systems biology, and personalized medicine. The editors-in-chief were George P. Patrinos (University of Patras) and Emanuel F. Petricoin (George Mason University). The journal was established in 2009 and is published by SAGE Publications. The last article appeared in October 2011.

== Abstracting and indexing ==
The journal was abstracted and indexed in:

- Academic Onefile
- Academic Search Complete
- EMBASE
- PubMed Central
- Scopus
