= African Journal of Food, Agriculture, Nutrition and Development =

- Discipline: Agriculture, nutritional science
- Language: English

Publication details
- Former names: African Journal of Food and Nutritional Sciences
- History: 2001-present
- Publisher: Rural Outreach Program

Standard abbreviations
- ISO 4: Afr. J. Food Agric. Nutr. Dev.

Indexing
- ISSN: 1684-5358 (print); 1684-5374 (web)

Links
- Journal homepage

The African Journal of Food, Agriculture, Nutrition and Development is a peer-reviewed academic journal that covers food and nutrition issues in Africa.
