= Cell Communication and Signaling =

- Discipline: Biology
- Language: English

Publication details
- History: 2003–present
- Publisher: BioMed Central (United Kingdom)
- Open access: yes
- Impact factor: 8.2 (2023)

Standard abbreviations
- ISO 4: Cell Commun. Signal.

Indexing
- ISSN: 1478-811X

Links
- Journal homepage; Online archive

Cell Communication and Signaling is a peer-reviewed and open access scientific journal that publishes original research, reviews and commentaries with a focus on cellular signaling research. It was established in 2003 and is currently published by the London-based publisher BioMed Central.

Raymond Birge (Center for Cell Signaling, Rutgers Biomedical and Health Sciences, U Rutgers, The State University of New Jersey) has been the editor-in-chief of Cell Communication and Signaling since January 2017. In June 2012, Cell Communication and Signaling received its first impact factor.
