= AgBiotechNet =

Online database

AgBiotechNet is a searchable online database of scientific literature on topics related to agricultural biotechnology. Its target audience consists of biotechnology researchers and policymakers. Though some features on the site are available for free, others can only be accessed by paid subscribers. First launched in January 1999, AgBiotechNet is run by the Centre for Agriculture and Bioscience International (also known as CABI), which founded it along with Michigan State University's Agricultural Biotechnology Support Project.
