= Somatic Cell and Molecular Genetics =

- Discipline: Cell biology, Molecular genetics
- Language: English
- Edited by: Elliot R. Kaufman

Publication details
- Former name(s): Somatic Cell Genetics
- History: 1975–2002
- Publisher: Springer Science+Business Media
- Frequency: Bimonthly

Standard abbreviations
- ISO 4: Somat. Cell Mol. Genet.

Indexing
- CODEN: SCMGDN
- ISSN: 0740-7750 (print); 1572-9931 (web)
- OCLC no.: 10009256

Links
- Journal homepage

Somatic Cell and Molecular Genetics was a peer-reviewed scientific journal in the fields of cell biology and molecular genetics.

The journal was established in 1975 as Somatic Cell Genetics. The founding editor-in-chief was Richard L. Davidson (then of the University of Illinois College of Medicine). The journal expanded scope to encompass the increased development of molecular genetics and changed its name to reflect this with the tenth volume January 1984 edition. Davidson was succeeded as editor-in-chief by his colleague, Elliot R. Kaufman. The journal was published by Springer group companies: Plenum Press until 1992, then by Kluwer until publication ceased in 2002. Publication frequency was mostly bimonthly.

== Abstracting and indexing ==
Somatic Cell and Molecular Genetics is fully indexed in Index Medicus, MEDLINE, and PubMed.
