= Cell Proliferation (journal) =

Cell biology journal

- Discipline: Cell biology
- Language: English
- Edited by: Q. Zhou

Publication details
- Former names: Cell and Tissue Kinetics
- History: 1968–present
- Publisher: John Wiley & Sons
- Frequency: Monthly
- Open access: Yes
- Impact factor: 8.755 (2021)

Standard abbreviations
- ISO 4: Cell Prolif.

Indexing
- CODEN: CPROEM
- ISSN: 0960-7722 (print); 1365-2184 (web)
- LCCN: 2010250600
- OCLC no.: 859566688

Links
- Journal homepage; Online access; Online archive

Cell Proliferation is a monthly open-access online-only scientific journal covering cell biology. It was established in 1968 as Cell and Tissue Kinetics, obtaining its current title in 1991. It is published by John Wiley & Sons and the editor-in-chief is Q. Zhou (Chinese Academy of Sciences). According to the Journal Citation Reports, the journal has a 2021 impact factor of 8.755, ranking it 42nd out of 194 journals in the category "Cell Biology".
