= Biological Communications =

- Language: English
- Edited by: Pavel P. Skutschas

Publication details
- Former name(s): Vestnik of Saint Petersburg University. Series 3. Biology, Vestnik of Leningrad University. Biology
- History: 1956-present
- Publisher: St. Petersburg University Press (Russia)
- Frequency: Quarterly
- Open access: Yes

Standard abbreviations
- ISO 4: Biol. Commun.

Indexing
- ISSN: 2542-2154 (print); 2587-5779 (web)
- LCCN: 2017243320
- OCLC no.: 1006965660

Links
- Journal homepage; Online access; Online archive

Biological Communications is a quarterly peer-reviewed scientific journal subsidized and published by St. Petersburg University Press (Saint Petersburg State University). It covers research in all areas of the biological sciences. The editor-in-chief is Pavel P. Skutschas (Saint Petersburg State University).

The journal Vestnik of Leningrad University. Biology was established in 1946. Starting in 1953 it was split into several sections. The biology section (Vestnik of Saint Petersburg University. Series 3. Biology; Russian: Вестник Санкт-Петербургского университета. Серия 3. Биология) was established in 1956 and received its current title in 2017.

The journal is abstracted and indexed in BIOSIS Previews, Russian Science Citation Index, and The Zoological Record.
