= Iberus (journal) =

- Discipline: Malacology
- Language: English, Spanish
- Edited by: Serge Gofas

Publication details
- History: 1981–present
- Publisher: Sociedad Española de Malacología (Spain)

Standard abbreviations
- ISO 4: Iberus

Indexing
- ISSN: 0212-3010
- OCLC no.: 436548637

Links
- Journal homepage; Online archive at Biodiversity Heritage Library

Iberus is a peer-reviewed scientific journal published by the Sociedad Española de Malacología (Spanish Society of Malacology), covering research in malacology. The journal covers research on molluscs, with emphasis on taxonomy. It was established in 1981 and the editor-in-chief is Serge Gofas (University of Málaga).

== Abstracting and indexing ==
The journal is abstracted and indexed in Biological Abstracts, BIOSIS Previews, and The Zoological Record.
