= Biocatalysis & Biotransformation =

- Discipline: Biochemistry
- Language: English
- Edited by: David Leak

Publication details
- Former name: Biocatalysis
- History: 1987–present
- Publisher: Informa Healthcare (UK)
- Frequency: Bimonthly
- Open access: no

Standard abbreviations
- ISO 4: Biocatal. Biotransformation

Indexing
- CODEN: BOBOEQ
- ISSN: 1024-2422 (print); 1029-2446 (web)
- LCCN: 97661024
- OCLC no.: 32474843

Links
- Journal homepage

Biocatalysis & Biotransformation is an academic journal that provides coverage of the application, both actual and potential of biological catalysts, including whole cells or isolated components thereof, natural and modified enzymes and catalytic antibodies for the synthesis, interconversion or degradation of chemical species. It is published by Informa Healthcare. It was originally established as Biocatalysis, taking its current named in 1995.

== Core areas ==
Coverage includes:

- Mechanistic, principles, kinetics and thermodynamics of biocatalytic processes
- The chemical or genetic modification of biocatalysts
- Metabolic engineering
- Activity and stability of biocatalysts in non-aqueous and multi-phasic environments
- Environmental applications of biocatalysis

== Editor-in-chief ==
David Leak is the editor-in-chief of Biocatalysis & Biotransformation.

== Publication format ==
Biocatalysis & Biotransformation publishes 6 issues per year in simultaneous print and online editions.

Subscribers to the electronic edition of Biocatalysis & Biotransformation receive access to the online archive, which dates back to 1987, as part of their subscription.
