= Journal of Circadian Rhythms =

- Discipline: Circadian rhythms
- Language: English
- Edited by: Roberto Refinetti

Publication details
- History: 2003-present
- Publisher: Ubiquity Press
- Open access: Yes
- License: CC BY

Standard abbreviations
- ISO 4: J. Circadian Rhythms

Indexing
- CODEN: JCROB5
- ISSN: 1740-3391
- OCLC no.: 53403314

Links
- Journal homepage; Online access; Online archive

The Journal of Circadian Rhythms is a peer-reviewed open access scientific journal covering circadian and nycthemeral (daily) rhythms in living organisms, including processes associated with photoperiodism and daily torpor. It was established in 2003 and originally published by BioMed Central. Since 2015 it is published by Ubiquity Press. The editor-in-chief is Roberto Refinetti (Boise State University).

== Abstracting and indexing ==
The journal is abstracted and indexed in:

- PubMed Central
- Scopus
- Inspec
- EBSCOHost
- Embase
- Chemical Abstracts Service
- The Zoological Record
