= Critical Reviews in Clinical Laboratory Sciences =

- Discipline: Clinical laboratory sciences
- Language: English
- Edited by: Khosrow Adeli

Publication details
- History: 1970-present
- Publisher: Taylor and Francis
- Frequency: 8/year
- Impact factor: 4.677 (2019)

Standard abbreviations
- ISO 4: Crit. Rev. Clin. Lab. Sci.

Indexing
- CODEN: CRCLBH
- ISSN: 1040-8363 (print); 1549-781X (web)
- LCCN: 86641160
- OCLC no.: 01151594

Links
- Journal homepage; Online access; Online archive

Critical Reviews in Clinical Laboratory Sciences is a peer-reviewed medical journal that publishes review articles on all aspects of clinical laboratory sciences on an invitation-only basis. The journal is published by Taylor and Francis and the editor-in-chief is Khosrow Adeli (University of Toronto).

According to the Journal Citation Reports, the journal has a 2019 impact factor of 4.677.
