= Agroecology and Sustainable Food Systems =

- Discipline: Sustainable agriculture
- Language: English
- Edited by: Stephen R. Gliessman

Publication details
- Former name: Journal of Sustainable Agriculture
- History: 1990-present
- Publisher: Taylor & Francis
- Frequency: 10/year
- Impact factor: 1.636 (2019)

Standard abbreviations
- ISO 4: Agroecol. Sustain. Food Syst.

Indexing
- ISSN: 2168-3565 (print); 2168-3573 (web)
- LCCN: 2012200573
- OCLC no.: 1027874193
- Journal of Sustainable Agriculture
- ISSN: 1044-0046 (print); 1540-7578 (web)

Links
- Journal homepage; Online access; Online archive

Agroecology and Sustainable Food Systems is a peer-reviewed scientific journal covering sustainable agriculture. It was established in 1990 as the Journal of Sustainable Agriculture, obtaining its current title in 2013. It is published by Taylor & Francis and the editor-in-chief is Stephen R. Gliessman (University of California, Santa Cruz).

== Abstracting and indexing ==
The journal is abstracted and indexed in the Science Citation Index Expanded and Scopus.
