= Journal of Neuroimmunology =

- Discipline: Neuroimmunology
- Language: English
- Edited by: Michael Racke

Publication details
- History: 1981–present
- Publisher: Elsevier
- Impact factor: 3.221 (2021)

Standard abbreviations
- ISO 4: J. Neuroimmunol.

Indexing
- ISSN: 0165-5728

Links
- Journal homepage

The Journal of Neuroimmunology is a peer-reviewed scientific journal established in 1981 which focuses on the relationship between the nervous system and the immune system. It is published by Elsevier and the editor-in-chief is Michael Racke (Ohio State University College of Medicine). According to the Journal Citation Reports, the journal has a 2021 impact factor of 3.221.
