= American College of Allergy, Asthma and Immunology =

College

- Formation: 1942; 84 years ago
- Type: Professional association
- Headquarters: Arlington Heights, Illinois, United States of America
- Coordinates: 42.043709°N 87.987511°W
- Members: 6,500+
- Official language: English
- President: 2025-2026: David R. Stukus, MD, FACAAI
- Website: www.acaai.org

The American College of Allergy, Asthma and Immunology (ACAAI) is an American professional association of immunologists, asthma specialists and allergists. The organization is headquartered in Arlington Heights, Illinois, United States of America.

== Background ==
The academy was founded in 1942, as The American College of Allergists and was incorporated as a legal entity in the same year. The founders were passionate about establishing the field of Allergy and Immunology as a distinct medical specialty. In 1974, The American Board of Allergy and Immunology (ABAI) was established, further delineating the specialty.

== See also ==
- American Medical Association
