= Bioanalysis (journal) =

- Discipline: Biochemistry
- Language: English
- Edited by: Neil Spooner

Publication details
- History: 2009–present
- Publisher: Future Medicine
- Frequency: Biweekly
- Impact factor: 2.1 (2025)

Standard abbreviations
- ISO 4: Bioanalysis

Indexing
- CODEN: BIOAB4
- ISSN: 1757-6180 (print); 1757-6199 (web)
- OCLC no.: 663872147

Links
- Journal homepage

Bioanalysis is a biweekly peer-reviewed scientific journal established in 2009 and published by Taylor & Francis. The editor-in-chief is Neil Spooner (Spooner Bioanalytical Solutions Ltd, UK). The journal covers the field of bioanalysis, including drug and metabolite assays, chromatography and separation sciences, ligand binding assays, metabolomics, and key detection methods.

== Abstracting and indexing ==
The journal is abstracted and indexed in BIOSIS Previews, Chemical Abstracts, EMBASE/Excerpta Medica, Index MedicusMEDLINE//PubMed, Science Citation Index Expanded, and Scopus. The journal has a 2025 impact factor of 2.1.

== Awards ==
The journal partners with Bioanalysis Zone, an online community website, to run two annual award schemes – the Bioanalysis Young Investigator Award (awarded since 2012) and the Bioanalysis Outstanding Contribution Award (awarded since 2014).
