= Acta Biológica Colombiana =

- Discipline: Biology
- Language: English, Spanish
- Edited by: Nubia Estella Matta Camacho

Publication details
- History: 1982–present
- Publisher: National University of Colombia (Colombia)
- Frequency: Quarterly
- Open access: Yes
- License: CC BY-NC-SA

Standard abbreviations
- ISO 4: Acta Biol. Colomb.

Indexing
- CODEN: ABICEP
- ISSN: 0120-548X (print); 1900-1649 (web)
- LCCN: sn86016249
- OCLC no.: 632301916

Links
- Journal homepage

Acta Biológica Colombiana is a quarterly peer-reviewed open access scientific journal covering all aspects of biology with special emphasis on the Neotropics. It is published by the Science Faculty of the National University of Colombia and was established in 1982. The editor-in-chief is Gabriel Antonio Pinilla Agudelo. The journal is available online from its homepage and from Redalyc and SciELO.

== Abstracting and indexing ==
The journal is abstracted and indexed in:

- Biological Abstracts
- BIOSIS Previews
- CASSI
- Directory of Open Access Journals
- Latindex
- LILACS
- Redalyc
- SciELO
- Scopus
- The Zoological Record
