= Future Virology =

- Discipline: Virology
- Language: English

Publication details
- History: 2006–present
- Publisher: Future Medicine Ltd
- Frequency: Monthly
- Impact factor: 3.015 (2021)

Standard abbreviations
- ISO 4: Future Virol.

Indexing
- CODEN: FVUIAM
- ISSN: 1746-0794 (print); 1746-0808 (web)
- OCLC no.: 316181829

Links
- Journal homepage

Future Virology is a monthly peer-reviewed medical journal published by Future Medicine. The editor-in-chief is Mark Wainberg (McGill University). The journal covers all types of virus, both from the perspective of human health (vaccines and disease prevention, disease treatment, and drug resistance. The journal was established in 2006 and is published by Future Science Group.

== Abstracting and Indexing ==
The journal is abstracted and indexed by Biobase, Chemical Abstracts, Embase/Excerpta Medica, Science Citation Index Expanded, and Scopus. According to the Journal Citation Reports, the journal has a 2020 impact factor of 1.831, ranking it 30th out of 33 journals in the category "Virology".
