= Archives Italiennes de Biologie =

- Discipline: Neuroscience
- Language: English
- Edited by: Pietro Pietrini, Brunello Ghelarducci

Publication details
- History: 1882–present
- Publisher: Pisa University Press (Italy)
- Frequency: Quarterly
- Open access: Yes
- Impact factor: 1.422 (2013)

Standard abbreviations
- ISO 4: Arch. Ital. Biol.

Indexing
- CODEN: AIBLAS
- ISSN: 0003-9829
- LCCN: sn78006850
- OCLC no.: 231043091

Links
- Journal homepage; Online access; Online archive

The Archives Italiennes de Biologie: A Journal of Neuroscience is a quarterly peer-reviewed open access scientific journal. Established in 1882, its publication was suspended between 1936 and 1957. It originally covered all aspects of biology, especially physiology, but now focusses on neuroscience.

== Editors-in-chief ==
The following persons have been editors-in-chief of the journal:

- C. Emery and A. Mosso (1882–1886)
- A. Mosso (1887–1904)
- A. Mosso and V. Aducco (1905–1910)
- V. Aducco (1910–1936)
- G. Moruzzi (1957–1980)
- O. Pompeiano (1981–2002)
- O. Pompeiano and P. Pietrini (2003–2007)
- P. Pietrini and B. Ghelarducci (2008–present)

== Abstracting and indexing ==
The journal is abstracted and indexed in the Science Citation Index, Current Contents/Life Sciences, BIOSIS Previews, Chemical Abstracts Service, and Index Medicus/MEDLINE/PubMed. According to the Journal Citation Reports, the journal has a 2013 impact factor of 1.422.
