= Cell Communication & Adhesion =

UK academic journal

- Discipline: Cell/Molecular Biology
- Language: English
- Edited by: Pamela Cowin, Carien Niessen, Alpha Yap

Publication details
- Former names: Cell Adhesion & Communication
- History: First published 1993
- Publisher: Informa Healthcare (UK)
- Frequency: Quarterly
- Open access: no

Standard abbreviations
- ISO 4: Cell Commun. Adhes.

Indexing
- ISSN: 1541-9061 (print); 1543-5180 (web)

Links
- Journal homepage

Cell Communication & Adhesion (formerly Cell Adhesion & Communication) is an academic journal that publishes review articles on intercellular communication, intercellular junctions and families of adhesion receptors and counter receptors from diverse biological systems. It is published by Informa Healthcare.

== Core therapeutic areas ==
- Intercellular communication
- Intercellular junctions
- Receptor-based cell recognition & signaling

Cell Communication & Adhesion is owned by Informa plc

== Regional editors ==
Pamela Cowin, Carien Niessen and Alpha Yap are the regional editors of Cell Communication & Adhesion.

== Publication format ==
Cell Communication & Adhesion publishes six issues per year in simultaneous print and online editions.

== Cited articles ==
- An update on connexin genes and their nomenclature in mouse and man - Sohl, G; Willecke, K
- Identification of cells expressing Cx43, Cx30, Cx26, CX32 and Cx36 in gap junctions of rat brain and spinal cord - Rash, JE; Yasumura, T; Davidson, KGV; et al.
- Connexin-43 interactions with ZO-1 and alpha-and beta-tubulin - Giepmans, BNG; Verlaan, I; Moolenaar, WH
- Connexin channels, connexin mimetic peptides and ATP release - Le
