= Microscopy Research and Technique =

- Discipline: Microscopy
- Language: English
- Edited by: Alberto Diaspro

Publication details
- Former name: Journal of Electron Microscopy Technique
- History: 1984-present
- Publisher: Wiley-Blackwell
- Frequency: Monthly
- Impact factor: 2.1 (2025)

Standard abbreviations
- ISO 4: Microsc. Res. Tech.

Indexing
- ISSN: 1059-910X (print); 1097-0029 (web)
- OCLC no.: 24807748

Links
- Journal homepage; Online access; Online archive

Microscopy Research and Technique is a peer-reviewed scientific journal covering all areas of advanced microscopy in the biological, clinical, chemical, and materials science fields. The journal's title changed from Journal of Electron Microscopy Technique in 1992.
