= Small GTPases (journal) =

- Discipline: Cell biology, biochemistry
- Language: English
- Edited by: Michael F Olson

Publication details
- History: 2010-present
- Publisher: Taylor & Francis
- Frequency: Quarterly

Standard abbreviations
- ISO 4: Small GTPases

Indexing
- ISSN: 2154-1248 (print); 2154-1256 (web)
- LCCN: 2010201862
- OCLC no.: 567814209

Links
- Journal homepage; Online access; Online archive

Small GTPAses is a peer-reviewed scientific journal covering research on small GTPases, including their structural biology, biochemical regulation, and their individual and collective cell biological functions. The journal was established in 2010 and is published by Taylor & Francis. The editor-in-chief is Michael F Olson (Ryerson University). The journal is abstracted and indexed in MEDLINE/PubMed, Embase, and Scopus.
