= Nutritional Neuroscience (journal) =

- Discipline: Nutrition science, biological psychiatry
- Language: English
- Edited by: Byron C. Jones

Publication details
- History: 1998-present
- Publisher: Taylor & Francis
- Frequency: 8/year
- Impact factor: 5.000 (2020)

Standard abbreviations
- ISO 4: Nutr. Neurosci.

Indexing
- ISSN: 1028-415X (print); 1476-8305 (web)
- OCLC no.: 474540955

Links
- Journal homepage

Nutritional Neuroscience is a peer-reviewed scientific journal published by Taylor & Francis covering research at the intersection between neuroscience and food science, the field of nutritional neuroscience. The founding editor is Chandan Prasad (Texas Woman's University). The editor-in-chief is Byron C. Jones (University of Tennessee Health Science Center).

== Abstracting and indexing ==
The journal is abstracted and indexed in :

- Chemical Abstracts
- Excerpta Medica/EMBASE
- Food Science and Technology Abstracts
- Index Medicus/MEDLINE/PubMed
- Neuroscience Citation Index
- PsycINFO
- Scopus
- Science Citation Index Expanded

According to the Journal Citation Reports, the journal has a 2020 impact factor of 5.000.
