= Herpes (beetle) =

Scientific classification
- Kingdom: Animalia
- Phylum: Arthropoda
- Class: Insecta
- Order: Coleoptera
- Suborder: Polyphaga
- Infraorder: Cucujiformia
- Family: Curculionidae
- Genus: Herpes; Bedel, 1874
- Species: H. porcellus

Binomial name
- Herpes porcellus (Lacordaire, 1863)

Synonyms
- Brachycerus porcellus Lacordaire, 1863; Pterothorax korbi Weise, 1893

Genus of beetles

Herpes is a genus of beetles belonging to the family Curculionidae. It is monotypic, the only species being Herpes porcellus Lacordaire, 1863. It is found in southeastern Europe.
