= Herpes (journal) =

Herpes: The Journal of the IHMF
- Discipline: Microbiology
- Language: English

Publication details
- History: 1996–2009
- Publisher: Cambridge Medical Publication
- Frequency: Triannual

Standard abbreviations
- ISO 4: Herpes

Indexing
- ISSN: 0969-7667

Herpes: The Journal of the IHMF was a triannual peer-reviewed medical journal published by Cambridge Medical Publications and the official journal of the International Herpes Management Forum. It was indexed from 1997 in Scopus and from 2001 in Index Medicus/MEDLINE/PubMed, until 2009, when the last issue was published. Articles were usually solicited and publication was supported by an educational grant from GlaxoSmithKline and 3M Pharmaceuticals.
