= The Journal of Biochemistry =

- Discipline: Biochemistry
- Language: English
- Edited by: Makoto Nakanishi

Publication details
- History: 1922–present
- Publisher: Oxford University Press on behalf of the Japanese Biochemical Society
- Frequency: Monthly
- Impact factor: 3.387 (2020)

Standard abbreviations
- ISO 4: J. Biochem.

Indexing
- CODEN: JOBIAO
- ISSN: 0021-924X (print); 1756-2651 (web)
- LCCN: 51031430
- OCLC no.: 1782512

Links
- Journal homepage

The Journal of Biochemistry is a peer-reviewed scientific journal that covers research on biochemistry, molecular biology, cell biology, and biotechnology. It was established in 1922 and is published by Oxford University Press on behalf of the Japanese Biochemical Society. The editor-in-chief is Makoto Nakanishi (The University of Tokyo). According to the Journal Citation Reports, the journal has a 2020 impact factor of 3.387.

== Article types ==
The Journal of Biochemistry publishes Regular Papers (original scientific work), Rapid Communications (complete, yet brief, accounts of work), and Reviews (short reviews solicited by the editorial board).
