= EMBiology =

EmBiology (formerly EMBiology) is a web-based Software as a service tool from Elsevier in which researchers can view biological relationships between entities, such as genes, proteins, and cells.

Launched in 2023, EmBiology queries a Biological Knowledge Graph with 1.4 million entities connected by 15.7 million relationships. It uses a Sankey diagram to visualize search findings, and displays "snippets" of text from relevant scientific literature.

== Previous version ==
EmBiology was originally launched as EMBiology in 2005 as a life science bibliographic database in a partnership with Ovid Technologies as a smaller version of Embase.

== Content coverage ==
EmBiology Data sources include:

- 7.2 million PubMed abstracts
- 430,000 from Clinicaltrials.gov
- 7.2 million Full-text articles from 936 Elsevier journals and 939 non-Elsevier journals

== Biological concepts ==
The following biological concepts are included in EmBiology:

Concept	Description
Drugs & chemicals	Naturally occurring metabolites, small molecules found in cell, drugs (incl. small molecules & biologics)
Diseases	Health conditions and disease terms
Proteins	Represents both genes and the gene products, including proteins and miRNAs
Functional classes	Proteins classes based on biological function
Protein complexes	One or more polypeptides that form a complex via physical interactions
Genetic variant	Variants searchable by SNPID and text
Cells	Mammalian cell types & cell lines
Cell Process	Biological processes (e.g., apoptosis, inflammation)
Organs	Mammalian organ types
Tissues	Mammalian tissue types
Viruses	An agent that causes infectious diseases
Clinical parameter	Measured parameters of the human body used in clinical practice
Treatment	Non-chemical treatments and environmental conditions
Cell object	Organelles, cell structural components

== Biological Relationships ==
The following biological relationships are included in EmBiology

Relation	Description	Example
Expression	Changes protein abundance by affecting levels of transcript or protein stability	MDM2 has a negative "Expression" relationship with TP53
miRNA Effect	Inhibitory effect of an miRNA on its mRNA target	miR-30 has a negative "miRNAEffect" relationship with TP53
Promoter Binding	Binds to the promoter of a gene	FOXC1 has a positive "PromoterBinding" relationship with MMP7
Regulation	Changes activity by an unknown mechanism (may be direct or indirect)	SOCS3 has a positive "Regulation" relationship with diabetes mellitus
Direct Regulation	Influences activity by direct physical interaction	BRCA1 has a "DirectRegulation" relationship with BARD1
Binding	Direct physical interaction between two molecules	FANCD2 has a "Binding" relationship with BRCA1
Protein Modification	Changes the modification of the target molecule, usually by direct interaction	SRC has a "ProtModification" relationship with GRB2
Biomarker	Identification of proteins/complexes/functional classes/metabolites that are prognostic or diagnostic biomarkers for a disease	Lung cancer has a "Biomarker" relationship with IL6
Genetic Change	Genetic changes such as gene deletions, amplifications, mutations or epigenetic changes	Lung cancer has a "GeneticChange" relationship with ALK
Quantitative Change	Changes in abundance/activity/expression of a gene/protein/small molecule in a disease state	Breast cancer has a positive "QuantitativeChange" relationship with AGK
State Change	Changes in a protein's post-translational modification status or alternative splicing events	Breast cancer has a "StateChange" relationship with estrogen receptor
Functional Assoc.	Between a disease and a cellular process or another disease	Chronic pancreatitis has a "FunctionalAssociation" relationship with pancreatic cancer
Chemical Reaction	Either enzyme catalysed or spontaneous chemical reaction	CYP3A has a "ChemicalReaction" relationship with ticagrelor
Molecular Synthesis	Changes the concentration of the target	CYP3A has a "MolSynthesis" relationship with midazolam
Molecular Transport	Changes the localization of the target	Tamoxifen has a positive "MolTransport" relationship with MAPK3
Clinical Trial	Clinical trials conducted for a drug against a disease (from CT.gov)	Tamoxifen has a positive "Clinical Trial" relationship with breast cancer
Cell Expression	Expression of proteins within or on the surface of a cell	Hepatocyte has a "CellExpression" relationship with EGFR
