= International rankings of Canada =

Canada is recognized in international rankings for a variety of reasons, ranging from its high standard of living to its strong economy, political stability and positive international reputation. Canada ranks high internationally on its social, legal, healthcare and education systems with its universities ranked among the best in the world. Since the late 20th century the country has consistently ranked high in other various indices measuring factors such as human rights, quality of life, safety, happiness, prosperity and sustainability. This has led to Canada being recognized as one of the best countries in the world. Despite these facts, Canada has seen a slight decline in several global performance rankings during the mid 2020s, due to varied domestic economic concerns, and ranks among the lowest of the most advanced economies for income growth, housing affordability, technology affordability, aviation affordability and healthcare accessibility.

== International rankings ==
Note: Below each survey uses a limited number of countries/region's for its assessments, see "Measurement(s)" for number variables.

Organization	Survey	Rank (highest)	Measurement(s)/Notes	Year
Ipsos	Global leadership influence	1	Most positive leadership on the world stage across 30 countries. (likely to have a positive impact on world affairs over next decade)	2025
Reputation Lab (RepCore)	Best international reputation	1	International reputation of the world’s 60 largest economies.	2025
OECD	Tertiary education	1	Based on those 25- to 64-year-olds having completed tertiary education of G7 countries. For two decades Canada has led OECD countries in percentage of adults with post-secondary education.	2024
Asher & Lyric	LGBTQ+ Danger Index	1	Measures the human rights of lesbian, gay, bisexual, transgender, queer, 2-spirit and intersex (LGBTQ2I) people in 203 countries. Note: Canada ranked second in the Gay Travel Index chart in 2023, and sixth in the Equaldex Equality Index in 2023.	2023
Remitly	Most popular countries for moving abroad	1	Survey across 26 countries to find out which destinations people most want to relocate to, and why?	2025
Anholt -Ipsos	Nation branding	3	Measures national competence, governance, immigration and investment, people; exports, tourism and culture in the 50 most developed countries	2025
International Comparisons (OECD)	Social justice	3	Arithmetic average of individual indicators of a "Just society" of the 40 most developed countries:	2022
UN Trade and Development (UNCTAD)	World Investment Report	5	Foreign direct investment inflow top 20 advanced economies	2026
Institute of Fiscal Studies and Democracy	Social Development and Quality of Life	6	Measure country's institutional quality, political stability, and social justice	2025
Fund for Peace	Fragile States Index- List	6	Measures risk and vulnerability of individuals of 179 countries. Canada was #3 in 2006	2025
United Nations	Good Country Index	7	Measure how much each country contributes to the planet and to the human race, relative to its size (measured in GDP) of 125 countries	2026
Remote Technology	Global Life-Work Balance Index	7	Measures quality of work-life balance of 60 countries with the highest standard of living.	2026
The Economist	Global Food Security Index	7	Measures food affordability, availability, quality, safety, sustainability and adaptation of 109 countries	2022
Brand Finance	Global Soft Power Index	8	Ranks 193 countries ability to influence or persuade others countries	2026
Charities Aid Foundation	World Giving Index	8	Ranks over 140 countries according to how charitable they are (foreign aid). See Canadian international assistance	2022
The Economist	Democracy Index	9	Measures pluralism, civil liberties and political culture of 167 countries. Canada was ranked # 5 in 2020.	2025
State of World Liberty Project	State of World Liberty Index	10	Degree of economic and personal freedoms of 183 countries	2025
Organisation for Economic Co-operation and Development	OECD Better Life Index	11	Measures wellbeing, environmental quality, quality of public services and security of the 36 most developed countries. Canada was # 4 in 2020	2025
Travel Safe - Abroad	Safest countries Index	12	Measures public safety based on the number of incidents including mugging, drugs, violent crimes, bribery, property crimes, stolen vehicles, religion, and racial tolerance of 163 countries	2022
TheGlobalEconomy.com	Public services index	13	Measures quality of public services of 177 countries	2024
World Economic Forum	Global Competitiveness Index	13	Measures level of prosperity of citizens of 144 economies	2024
World Intellectual Property Organization	Global Innovation Index	16	Measures success in innovation of 139 countries. Canada was ranked 16th	2026
Legatum	Prosperity Index	15	Measures wealth, economic growth, education, health, personal well-being, and quality of life of 167 countries	2021
Institute for Economics and Peace	Global Peace Index	14	Measures overall peacefulness of 162 countries. Canada was ranked #3 in 2012	2026
United Nations Development Programme	Human Development Index	16	Based on life expectancy, education, and per capita income of 187 countries. Note: Norway has been ranked the highest sixteen times, Canada eight times, Japan and Iceland twice and Switzerland once. See Human Development Index#Past top countries. See also List of Canadian provinces and territories by Human Development Index	2025
International Institute for Management Development	Most competitive economies	16	Economic indicators such as gross domestic product (GDP), unemployment and healthcare / education of the 67 most developed countries. Canada was ranked # 13 in 2019.	2025
World Population Foundation	Best Countries To Live	16	Measures equality among genders, literacy, average life expectancy, and financial stability of 146 countries	2022
Transparency International	Corruption Perceptions Index	16	Based on public sector corruption of 175 countries & territories. Canada was #11 in 2021.	2026
Georgetown University	Women, Peace and Security Index	17	Measures women’s well-being—inclusion (economic, social, political); justice (formal laws and informal discrimination); and security (at the family, community, and societal levels)	2026
World Economic Forum	Global Gender Gap Report	19	Measures gender equality of 142 countries	2020
U.S. News & World Report	Best Countries	19	Measures overall quality of life in the most developed countries. In 2024, Canada ranked fourth in the world in U.S. News & World Report's. Canada has been ranked in the top five countries by U.S. News for the past four years. Canada ranked first in 2021, and 2nd place a few years in a row.	2026
World Bank	Ease of doing business index	23	Regulatory environment of 189 countries	2021
Social Progress Imperative	Social Progress Index	23	Measures well-being of a society of 132 countries. Canada was ranked 6th in 2000.	2021
UN Sustainable Development Solutions Network	World Happiness Report	25	Based on (quality of) life factors of 156 countries. Canada was # 15 in 2024	2026
Numbeo	Quality of Life Index	26	Measures eight indices: purchasing power (including rent), safety, health care, cost of living, property price to income ratio, traffic commute time, pollution and climate.	2026
Yale and Columbia Universities	Environmental Performance Index	29	Environmental performance of 178 countries. Canada was ranked # 20 in 2020	2026

== Freedom assessments ==
Freedom indices produced by several non-governmental organizations publishes assessments of political rights and civil liberties for countries around the world.

Freedom in the World index is an annual report by US-based think-tank Freedom House, which rates political rights and civil liberties of 195 "countries" (the 193 UN member states, as well as Kosovo and Taiwan), and 13 "territories". In 2025 Canada was ranked "Free" (the highest possible rating), with a Global Freedom Score of 97 out of 100.
According to the Democracy Index, an annual index published by the U.K.-based Economist Intelligence Unit, that measures pluralism, civil liberties, and the state of democracy, in 2026 Canada was ranked 9th out of 167 countries and received a score of 9.08 out of 10.00. This is an increase from 13th position in 2023.

According to the annual Worldwide Press Freedom Index published by Reporters Without Borders, in 2026 Canada ranked 20th. Canada previously ranked 14th out of 180 countries in 2024, up one spot from 15th in 2023 and from 19th in 2022.

According to the annual Corruption Perceptions Index, published by Transparency International, Canada was ranked 16th out of 180 countries from the least corrupt in 2025, a decrease from the 12th position in 2023.

== V-Dem democratic indices ==
V-Dem Democracy Indices of 179 countries by the V-Dem Institute consists of various democratic matrix, that are measured from 0.00 (indicating the lowest degree of democracy) to 1.00 (indicating the highest degree of democracy). Although Canadian scores have experienced a decline over the past decade (2016 - 2026), it remains ranked amongst the world's strongest democracies.

0.900–1.000
0.800–0.899
0.700–0.799
0.600–0.699
0.500–0.599
0.400–0.499
0.300–0.399
0.200–0.299
0.100–0.199
0.000–0.099
no data

Liberal Democracy Index
Canada ranked 23rd with a score of 0.74 in 2026
(ranked 11th in 2017)

Electoral Democracy Index
Canada ranked 16th with a score of 0.84 in 2026
(ranked 7th in 2017)

Liberal Component Index
Canada ranked 31st with a score of 0.87 in 2026
(ranked 21st in 2017)

Participatory Component Index
Canada ranked 25th with a score of 0.64 in 2026
(ranked 1st iin 2017)

Deliberative Component Index
Canada ranked 52nd with the score of 0.79 in 2026
(ranked 7th in 2017)

Egalitarian Component Index
Canada ranked 62nd with a score 0.70 in 2026
(ranked 6th in 2017)

== Lowest rankings of advanced economies ==
Below each survey uses a limited number of advanced economies or developed countries for its assessment, see "Notes" for country number variables.

Organization	Survey	Rank (lowest)	Notes	Measurement(s)	Year
OECD	Worst nominal house prices	1	Most unaffordable housing of the 38 most advanced economies	Comparing average home prices to average incomes. See also Lists of countries by GDP per capita	2026
Rewheel	Most expensive wireless costs	1	4G and 5G prices of the 50 most developed countries	Measures wireless costs	2023
OECD	Lowest amount of acute care beds	1	Comparing the healthcare systems of the 9 most advanced economies	Measures acute care beds per capita	2026
International Energy Agency	Lowest fuel-inefficient vehicles	1	Ranked against the 53 most developed countries	Measures the fuel economy of private cars from 2005 to 2017	2019
C.D. Howe Institute	Worst World Development Indicators	1	Canada ranked last in the G7 and 32nd out of 35 OECD countries	Real wealth comparison of international peers. "A measure of the income available to Canadians"	2026
Commonwealth Fund	Worst publicly funded healthcare system	2	Comparing the healthcare systems of the 11 most advanced economies, Canada ranked 10th - second -to-last.	Measures access to care, care process, administrative efficiency, equity, and health care outcomes	2021
Federal Reserve Economic Data,	Aviation Price Index	6	"Data from domestic and internationa flights of 75 most frequented countries in the world"	Most expensive countries for airline travel	2025
Fraser Institute	Misery Index	6	Most “Miserable” Country Among 35 most advanced economies	Measures inflation rate coupled with unemployment rate.	2022

== Maps of indices ==
Country ratings from Freedom in the World 2026 by Freedom House

2023 Index of Economic Freedom by The Heritage Foundation and Wall Street Journal

Press freedom in 2026, according to Reporters Without Borders

The Economist Democracy Index in 2025 by the Economist Intelligence Unit

The Corruption Perceptions Index in 2025

2026 World Happiness Report

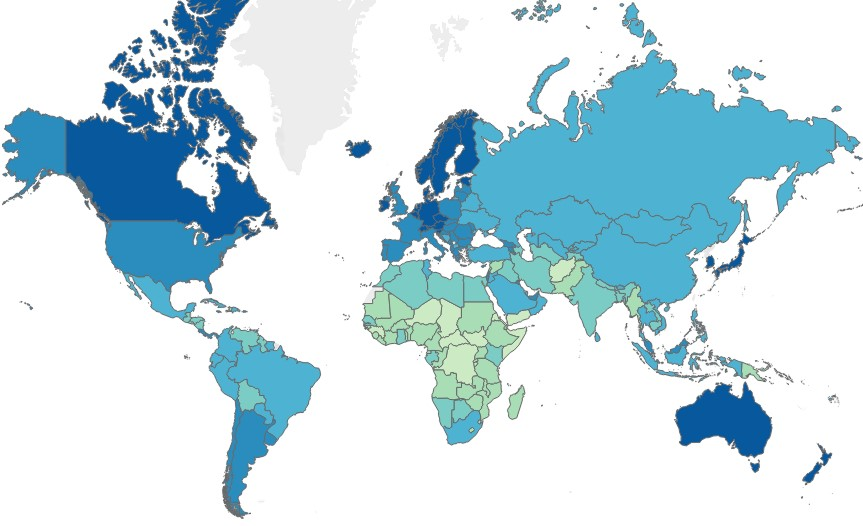
2022 Social Progress Index

Human Development Index 2022

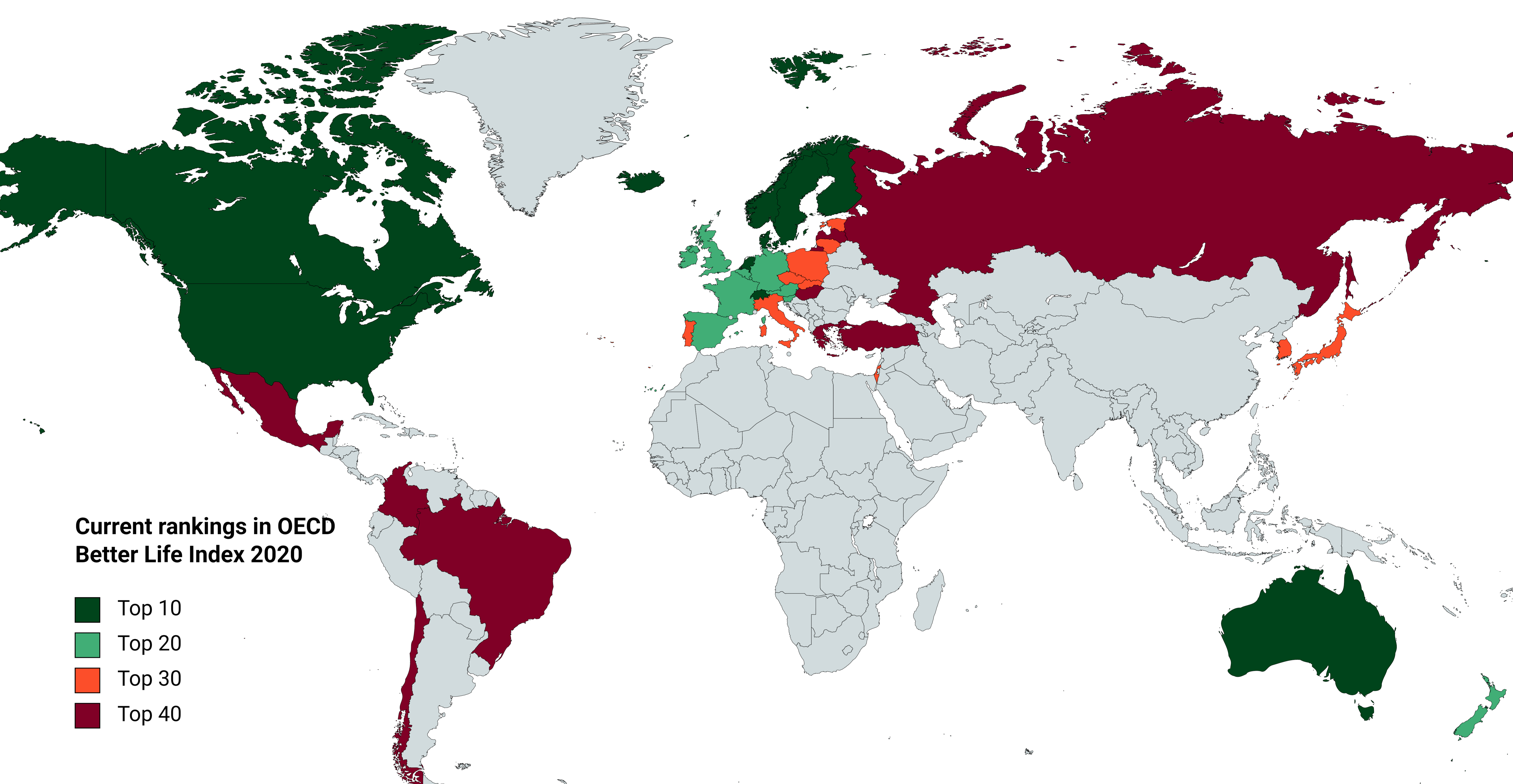
Better Life Index 2020

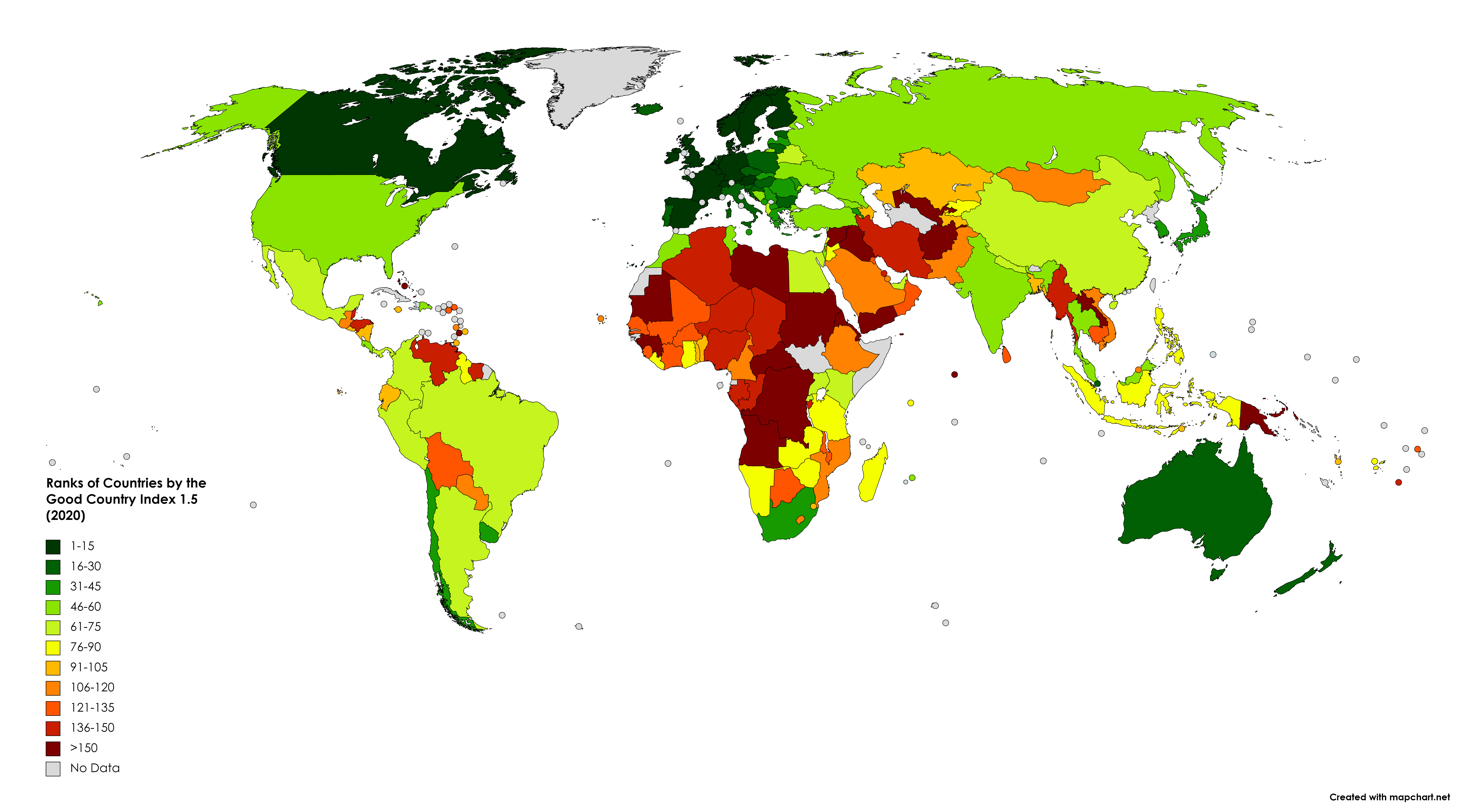
Good Country Index 2020

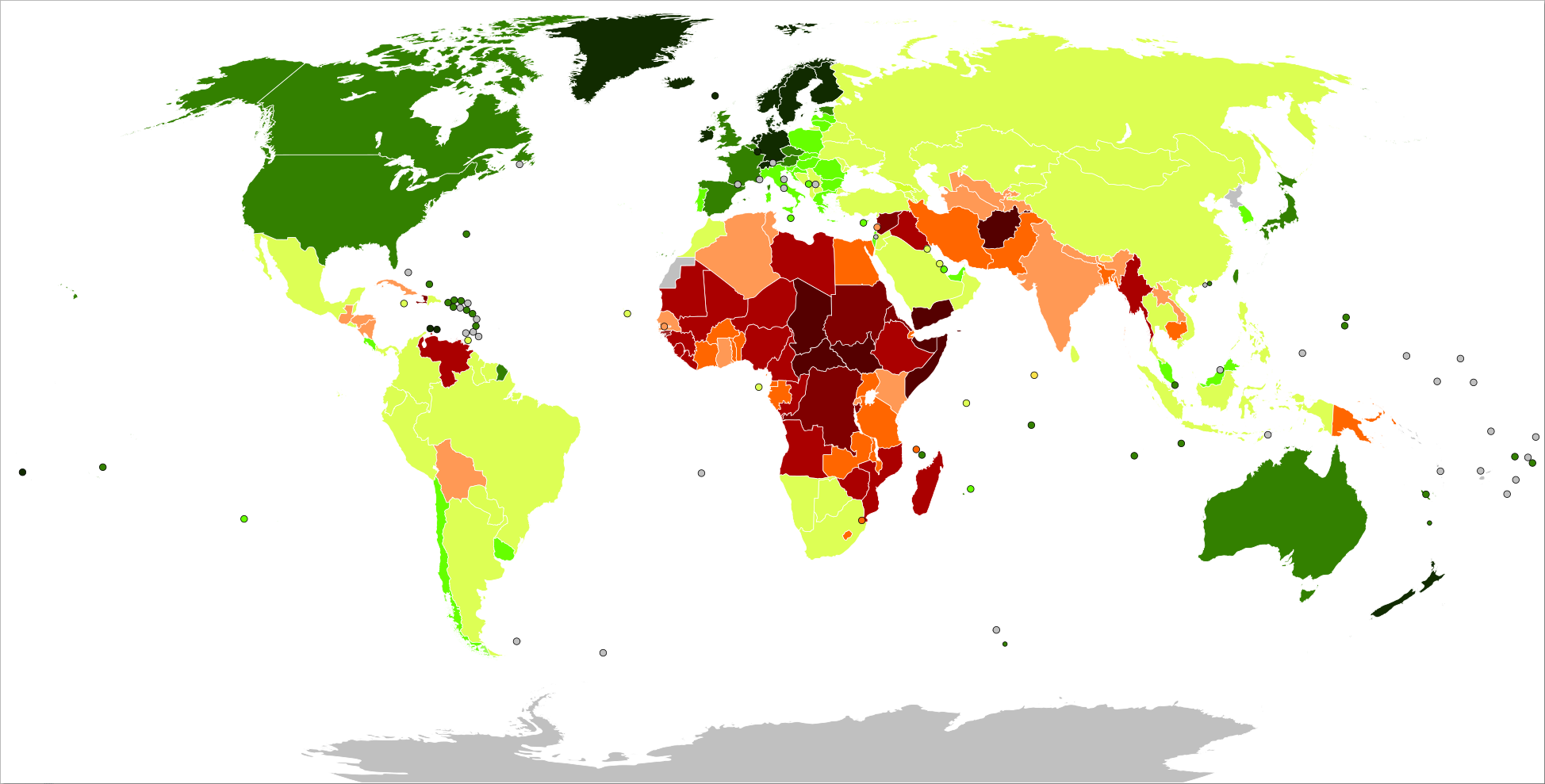
2023 Legatum Prosperity Index

Gender Inequality Index 2020

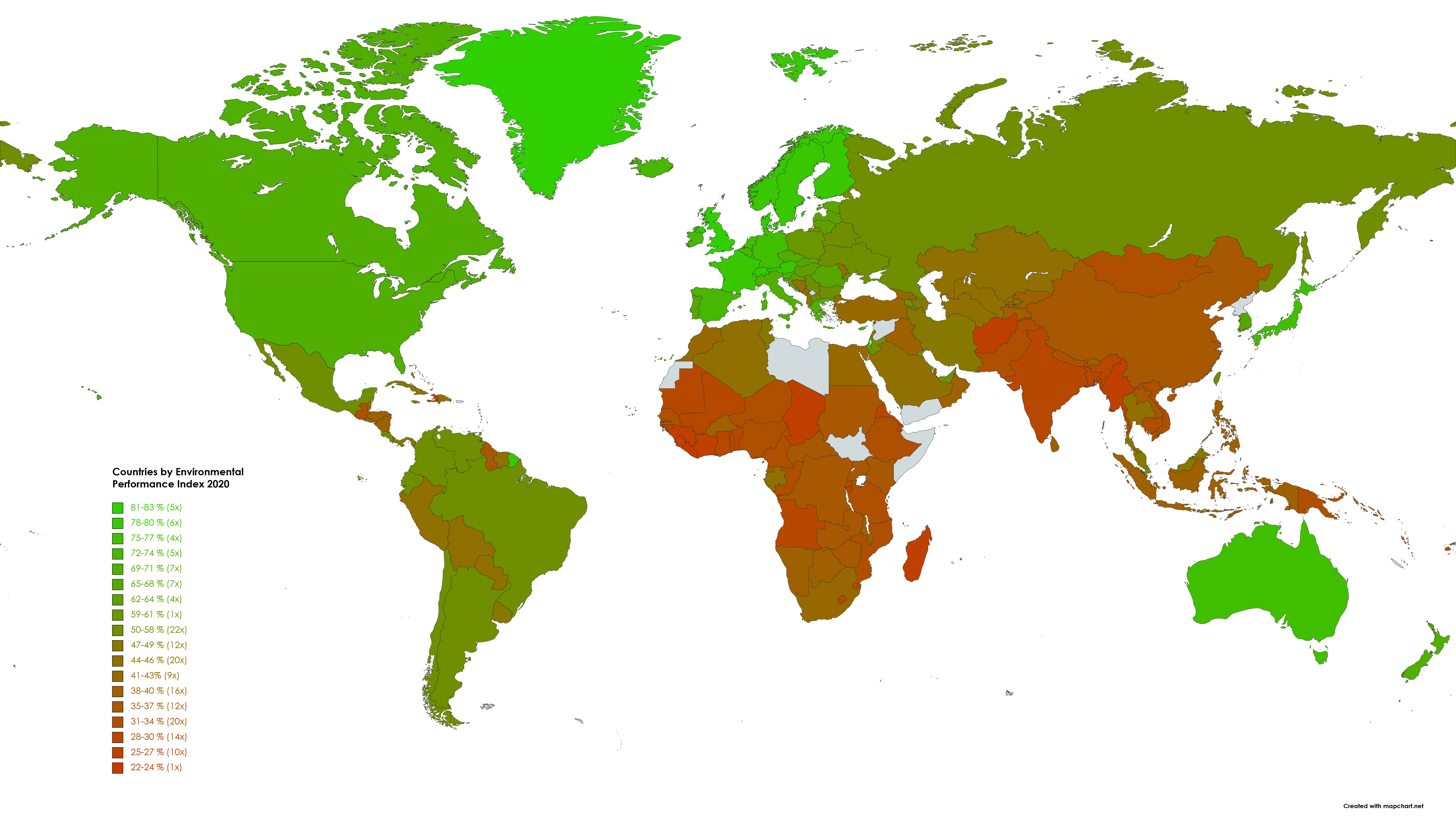
Environmental Performance Index 2020

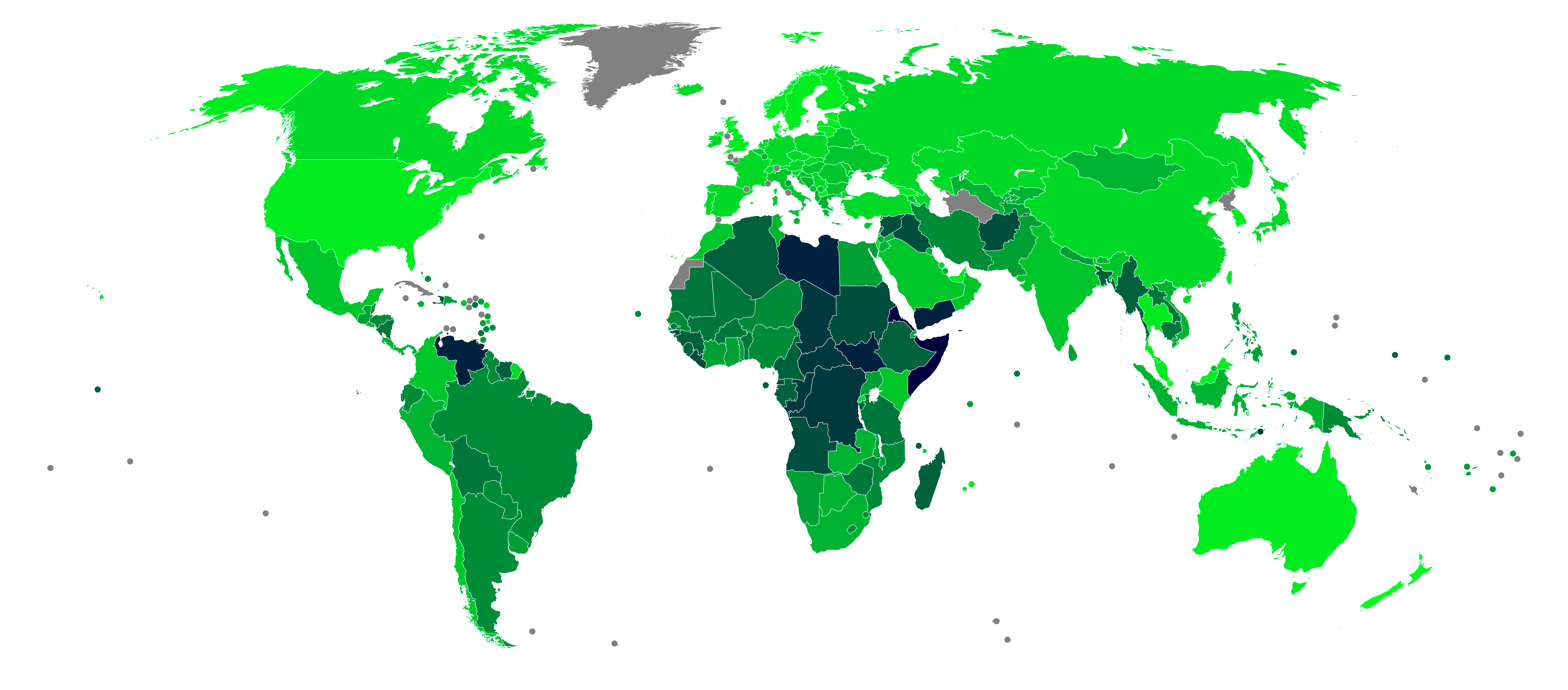
Ease of doing business index 2020

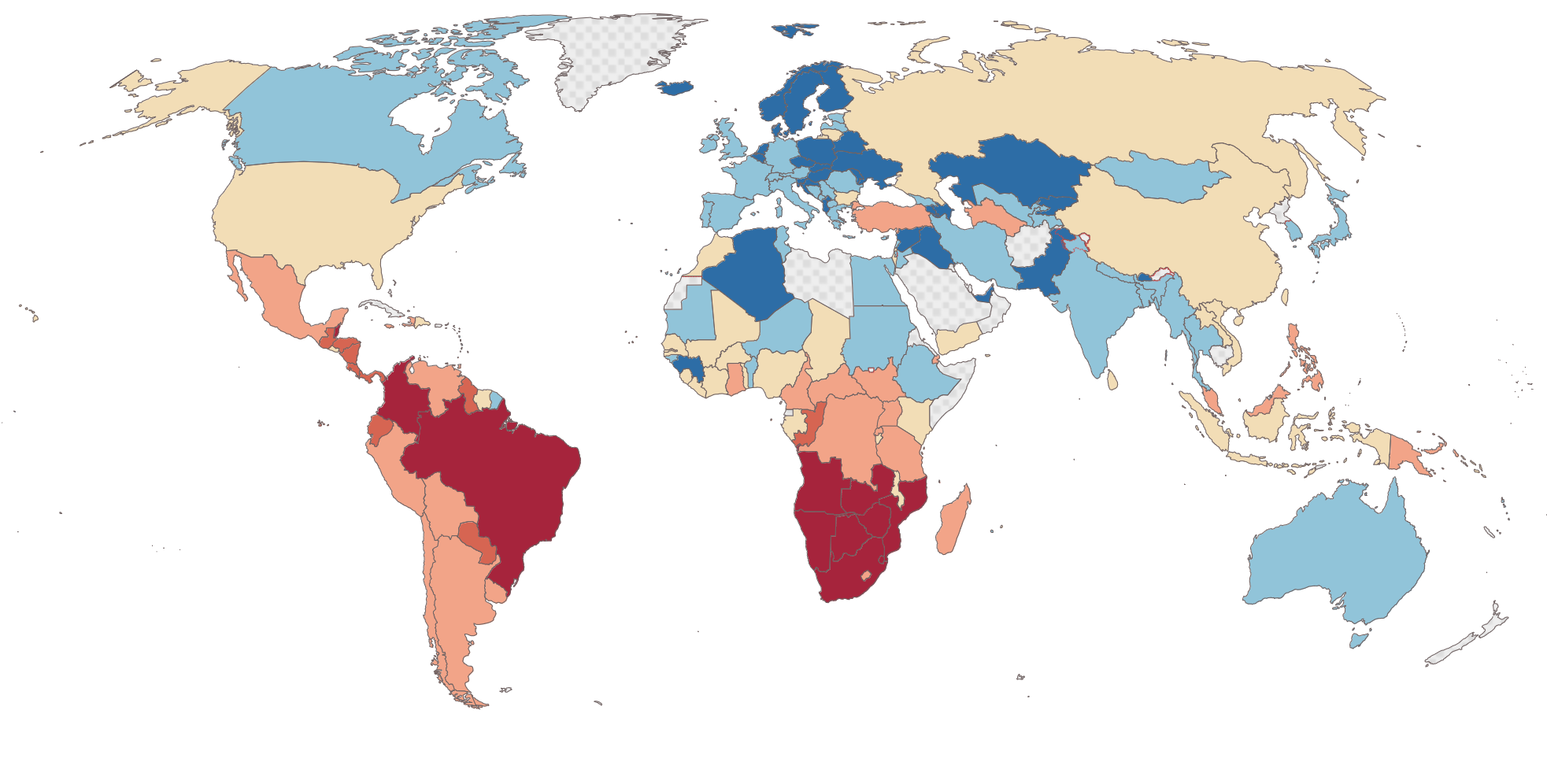
Income inequality Gini index 2022

Internet censorship and surveillance by country

Infant mortality rates 2025

== See also ==
Canadian society

- Canadian identity
- Canadian values
- Freedom of expression in Canada
- Freedom of religion in Canada
- Foreign relations of Canada
- Human rights in Canada
- LGBT rights in Canada
- Women's rights in Canada

Lists

- List of Canadian provinces and territories by Human Development Index
- List of Canadian provinces and territories by GDP
- List of Canadian provinces and territories by life expectancy
- List of governments in Canada by annual expenditures
- List of Canadian provinces by unemployment rate
- Population of Canada by province and territory
