= List of Canadian provinces and territories by Human Development Index =

This is a list of Canadian provinces and territories by their Human Development Index, which is a comparative measure of life expectancy, literacy, education, standard of living and overall well-being of the citizens in each province and territory. All Canadian provinces and territories have a very high (greater than 0.800) HDI.

== Human Development Index ==
Rank	Province or territory	HDI (2023)
1	Ontario	0.945
1	Quebec	0.945
3	Alberta	0.942
—	Canada (average)	0.940
4	British Columbia	0.937
5	Yukon	0.934
6	Saskatchewan	0.932
7	Newfoundland and Labrador	0.928
8	Prince Edward Island	0.924
9	Nova Scotia	0.920
10	Manitoba	0.914
10	New Brunswick	0.914
12	Northwest Territories	0.899
13	Nunavut	0.834

== See also ==
- International rankings of Canada
- List of Canadian provinces and territories by GDP
- List of Canadian provinces and territories by life expectancy
- List of governments in Canada by annual expenditures
- List of Canadian provincial and territorial name etymologies
- Population of Canada by province and territory
