= Provinces and territories of Canada =

Top-level subdivisions of Canada

- Category: Federated state
- Number: 10 provinces; 3 territories
- Government: Constitutional monarchy

Canada has ten provinces and three territories that are sub-national administrative divisions under the jurisdiction of the Canadian Constitution. In the 1867 Canadian Confederation, three provinces of British North America—New Brunswick, Nova Scotia, and the Province of Canada (which upon Confederation was divided into Ontario and Quebec)—united to form a federation, becoming a fully independent country over the next century. Over its history, Canada's international borders have changed several times as it has added territories and provinces, making it the world's second-largest country by area.

The major difference between a Canadian province and a territory is that provinces receive their power and authority from the Constitution Act, 1867 (formerly called the British North America Act, 1867). Territories are federal territories whose territorial governments have powers delegated to them by the Parliament of Canada. Powers are divided between the Government of Canada (the federal government) and the provincial governments by the Constitution Act, either exclusively or concurrently. A change to the division of powers between the federal government and the provinces requires a constitutional amendment. A similar change affecting the territories can be performed unilaterally by the government or Parliament of Canada.

In modern Canadian constitutional theory, the provinces are considered to be co-sovereign, based on the division of responsibility between the provincial and federal governments within the Constitution Act, 1867; each province thus has its own representative, the lieutenant governor, of the Canadian Crown. The territories are not sovereign but have their authorities and responsibilities devolved from the federal level; as a result, each has a commissioner who represents the federal government.

== Provinces ==
Provinces of Canada
Name and postal abbreviation		Cities		Became a province in Canada	Official language(s)	Population		Area (km^{2})			Seats	
Name and postal abbreviation		Capital	Largest	Became a province in Canada	Official language(s)	2021 census	Q3 2026 estimates	Land	Water	Total	Commons	Senate
Ontario	ON	Toronto		July 1, 1867	English (Note: De facto; French has limited constitutional status.)	14,223,942	16,262,121	917,741	158,654	1,076,395	122	24
Quebec	QC	Quebec City	Montreal	July 1, 1867	French (Note: As established under the Charter of the French Language. English has limited constitutional status in Quebec.)	8,501,833	9,067,114	1,356,128	185,928	1,542,056	78	24
Nova Scotia	NS	Halifax (Note: Nova Scotia dissolved cities in 1996 in favour of regional municipalities; its largest regional municipality is therefore substituted.)		July 1, 1867	English	969,383	1,103,419	53,338	1,946	55,284	11	10
New Brunswick	NB	Fredericton	Moncton	July 1, 1867	English, French (Note: As established under Section 16 of the Canadian Charter of Rights and Freedoms.)	775,610	883,522	71,450	1,458	72,908	10	10
Manitoba	MB	Winnipeg		July 15, 1870	English	1,342,153	1,517,379	553,556	94,241	647,797	14	6
British Columbia	BC	Victoria	Vancouver	July 20, 1871	English	5,000,879	5,710,598	925,186	19,549	944,735	43	6
Prince Edward Island	PE	Charlottetown		July 1, 1873	English	154,331	182,989	5,660	0	5,660	4	4
Saskatchewan	SK	Regina	Saskatoon	September 1, 1905	English (Note: As established under Languages Acts passed by Alberta and Saskatchewan's respective legislatures in 1988. French has limited constitutional status.)	1,132,505	1,278,402	591,670	59,366	651,036	14	6
Alberta	AB	Edmonton	Calgary	September 1, 1905	English	4,262,635	5,101,050	642,317	19,531	661,848	37	6
Newfoundland and Labrador	NL	St. John's		March 31, 1949	English	510,550	552,462	373,872	31,340	405,212	7	6
Total provinces						36,873,821	41,659,056	5,490,918	572,013	6,062,931	340	102

== Territories ==
There are three territories in Canada. Unlike the provinces, the territories of Canada have no inherent sovereignty and have only those powers delegated to them by the federal government. They include all of mainland Canada north of latitude 60° north and west of Hudson Bay, and all islands north of the Canadian mainland, from those in James Bay to the Queen Elizabeth Islands. They cover 40% of Canada's land, but contain only 0.3% of the population. (Note: Source says 3% of population but simple calculations indicate 0.3%)

Another territory, the District of Keewatin, existed from October 7, 1876, to September 1, 1905, when it rejoined the Northwest Territories and became the Keewatin Region. It occupied the area that is now the Kenora District of Ontario, northern Manitoba, and mainland Nunavut. The government of Keewatin was based in Winnipeg, Manitoba. The territory did not have any representation in federal parliament.

The Northwest Territories has varied in size substantially through the years. In 1880, it covered 7.1 million km^{2} (2.7 million sq mi), and from 1925 to 1999, it covered 3.4 million km^{2} (1.3 million sq mi).

Territories of Canada
Name and postal abbreviation		Cities		Became a territory in Canada	Official languages	Population		Area (km^{2})			Seats	
Name and postal abbreviation		Capital	Largest	Became a territory in Canada	Official languages	2021 census	Q3 2026 estimates	Land	Water	Total	Commons	Senate
Northwest Territories	NT	Yellowknife		July 15, 1870	Chipewyan, Cree, English, French, Gwichʼin, Inuinnaqtun, Inuktitut, Inuvialuktun, North Slavey, South Slavey, Tłįchǫ	41,070	45,904	1,183,085	163,021	1,346,106	1	1
Yukon	YT	Whitehorse		June 13, 1898	English, French	40,232	50,356	474,391	8,052	482,443	1	1
Nunavut	NU	Iqaluit		April 1, 1999	Inuktut (Inuinnaqtun, Inuktitut), English, French	36,858	43,091	1,936,113	157,077	2,093,190	1	1
Total territories						118,160	139,351	3,593,589	328,150	3,921,739	3	3

== Population ==
Canada's population from the 2016 census by province/territory

The vast majority of Canada's population is concentrated in areas close to the Canada–US border. Its four largest provinces by area (Quebec, Ontario, British Columbia and Alberta) are (with Quebec and Ontario switched in order) its most populous. Together they account for 86% of Canada's population. The territories (the Northwest Territories, Nunavut and Yukon) account for over a third of Canada's area but are only home to 0.3% of its population, which skews the national population density value.

Canada's population grew by 5.0% between the 2011 and 2016 censuses. Except for New Brunswick, all territories and provinces increased in population during this time. In terms of percent change, the fastest-growing province or territory was Nunavut with an increase of 12.7% between 2011 and 2016, followed by Alberta with 11.6% growth, while New Brunswick's population decreased by 0.5%.

Generally, Canadian provinces have steadily grown in population along with Canada. However, some provinces such as Saskatchewan, Prince Edward Island and Newfoundland and Labrador have experienced long periods of stagnation or population decline. Ontario and Quebec have always been the two biggest provinces in Canada, with together over 60% of the population at any given time. The population of the West relative to Canada as a whole has steadily grown over time, while that of Atlantic Canada has declined.

== Territorial evolution ==
The territorial evolution of the borders and the names of Canada's provinces and territories

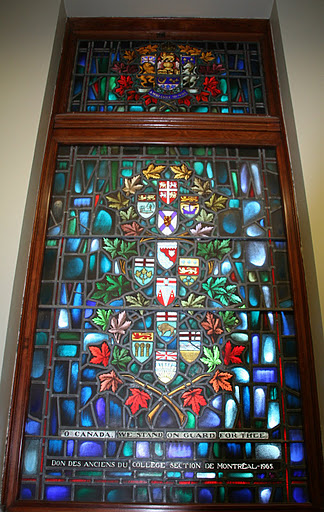
"O Canada we stand on guard for thee". Stained glass, Yeo Hall, Royal Military College of Canada. Featuring arms of the Canadian provinces and territories as of 1965.

Ontario, Quebec, New Brunswick, and Nova Scotia were the original provinces, formed when three British North American colonies federated on July 1, 1867, into the Dominion of Canada and by stages began accruing the indicia of sovereignty from the United Kingdom. (Ontario and Quebec had been united as the Province of Canada from 1841 to 1867.) Over the next six years, Manitoba (1870), British Columbia (1871), and Prince Edward Island (1873) joined as provinces.

The British Crown had claimed two large areas, known as Rupert's Land and the North-Western Territory, northwest of the original Dominion and assigned them to the Hudson's Bay Company. In 1870, the company relinquished its claims for £300,000 (CND$1.5 million), assigning the vast territory to the government of Canada. The area entered confederation as the Province of Manitoba and the North-West Territories.

The North-West Territories encompassed all of current northern and western Canada except for the British Arctic Territories in the Arctic Archipelago, the Colony of British Columbia, and the original Province of Manitoba, a small area in the south of today's province (which expanded to its present size in 1912). It also included the northern two-thirds of Ontario and Quebec.

In 1880, the British claims to the Arctic islands were transferred to Canada, adding to the size of the North-West Territories. In 1898, the Yukon Territory, renamed "Yukon" in 2003, was carved from the area surrounding the Klondike gold fields. In September 1905, a portion of the North-West Territories south of the 60th parallel north became the provinces of Alberta and Saskatchewan. In 1912, the boundaries of Quebec, Ontario, and Manitoba were expanded northward: Manitoba's to the 60° parallel, Ontario's to Hudson Bay and Quebec's to encompass the District of Ungava.

In 1869, the people of Newfoundland voted to remain a British colony over fears that taxes would increase with Confederation, and that the economic policy of the Canadian government would favour mainland industries. In 1907, Newfoundland acquired dominion status. In the middle of the Great Depression in Canada, Newfoundland underwent a prolonged economic crisis, and the legislature turned over political control to the Newfoundland Commission of Government in 1933. Following Canada's participation in the Second World War, in a 1948 referendum, a narrow majority of Newfoundland citizens voted to enter into Confederation, and on March 31, 1949, Newfoundland became Canada's tenth province. The province was renamed Newfoundland and Labrador in 2001.

Bermuda, the last British North American colony, which had been somewhat subordinated to Nova Scotia, was one of two Imperial fortress colonies in British North America – the other being Nova Scotia, and more particularly the city of Halifax. Halifax and Bermuda were the sites of the Royal Navy's North America and West Indies Station main bases, dockyards, and Admiralty Houses (called variously the River St. Lawrence and Coast of America and North America and West Indies Station, the North America and Newfoundland Station, the North America and West Indies Station, and the America and West Indies Station). The squadron of the station was based at Royal Naval Dockyard, Halifax, during the summers and Royal Naval Dockyard, Bermuda, in the winters. In the 1820s, Bermuda, which was better located to control the Atlantic Seaboard of the United States, impossible to attack over land, and almost impregnable against attack over water, became the main base year round.

A large British Army garrison in Bermuda, which fell under the commander-in-chief in Nova Scotia, existed to defend the colony as a naval base, and to prevent it becoming as useful a base to the navy of an adversary, and to support amphibious operations throughout the region, such as the Chesapeake campaign during the American War of 1812. Bermuda was consequently the most important British naval and military base in the Americas.

Canadian Confederation resulted in the Canadian Militia becoming responsible for the defence of the Maritimes, the abolition of the British Army's commander-in-chief there, and the reduction of British military forces in the Maritimes to a small garrison for the protection of the Halifax dockyard, which was withdrawn when the dockyard was handed over to the Dominion government in 1905 for use by the new Canadian naval service. Britain retained control of Bermuda as an imperial fortress, with the governor and commander-in-chief of Bermuda (a military officer previously ranking between lieutenant-colonel and major-general) becoming a lieutenant-general termed a general officer commanding and the Bermuda garrison becoming a command in its own right.

Bermuda was consequently left out of Canadian confederation. It retained naval links with Halifax. The state church (or established church), the Church of England, continued to place Bermuda under the bishop of Newfoundland until 1919. Bermuda also remained linked to the Maritimes under the Methodist and Roman Catholic churches.

In 1903, resolution of the Alaska Panhandle Dispute fixed British Columbia's northwestern boundary, the first of only two provincial reductions in Canada. In 1927, the second reduction occurred when a boundary dispute between Canada and the Dominion of Newfoundland saw Labrador (part of the Dominion of Newfoundland) enlarged at Quebec's expense. (In 1949, this land returned to Canada as part of the province of Newfoundland.) In 1999, Nunavut was created from the northern and eastern portions of the Northwest Territories.

The three territories are the most sparsely populated region in Canada, combined covering 3,921,739 km^{2} (1,514,192 mi^{2}) in land area. They are often referred to as a single region, the North, for organizational and economic purposes. For much of the Northwest Territories' early history, it was divided into several districts for ease of administration. The District of Keewatin was created as a separate territory from 1876 to 1905, after which, as the Keewatin Region, it became an administrative district of the Northwest Territories. In 1999, it was dissolved when it became part of Nunavut and, under different boundaries, was renamed the Kivalliq Region.

== Government ==
Theoretically, provinces have a great deal of power relative to the federal government, with jurisdiction over many public goods such as health care, education, welfare, and intra-provincial transportation. They receive "transfer payments" from the federal government to pay for these, as well as exacting their own taxes. In practice, however, the federal government can use these transfer payments to influence these provincial areas. For instance, in order to receive healthcare funding under Medicare, provinces must agree to meet certain federal mandates, such as universal access to required medical treatment.

Provincial and territorial legislatures have no second chamber like the Canadian Senate. Originally, most provinces had such bodies, known as legislative councils, with members titled councillors. These upper houses were abolished one by one, Quebec's being the last in 1968. In most provinces, the single house of the legislature is known as the legislative assembly. The exceptions are Nova Scotia and Newfoundland and Labrador, where the chamber is called the House of Assembly, and Quebec where it is called the National Assembly. Ontario has a legislative assembly but its members are called members of the Provincial Parliament or MPPs.

The legislative assemblies use a procedure similar to that of the House of Commons of Canada. The head of government of each province, called the premier, is generally the head of the party with the most seats. This is also the case in Yukon, but the Northwest Territories and Nunavut have no political parties at the territorial level. The King's representative in each province is the lieutenant governor. In each of the territories there is an analogous commissioner, but they represent the federal government rather than the monarch.

Federal, provincial, and territorial terminology compared
Jurisdiction	Legislature	Lower house	Members of lower house	Superior court	Head of government	Viceroy
Canada	Parliament	House of Commons	Member of Parliament (MP)	Federal Court	Prime Minister	Governor General
Ontario	Parliament	Legislative Assembly	Member of the Provincial Parliament (MPP) (Note: Members were previously titled "Member of the Legislative Assembly".)	Superior Court of Justice	Premier	Lieutenant Governor
Quebec (Note: Quebec's lower house was previously called the "Legislative Assembly" with members titled "Member of the Legislative Assembly". The name was changed at the same time Quebec's upper house was abolished.)	Parliament	National Assembly	Member of the National Assembly (MNA)	Superior Court	Premier	Lieutenant Governor
Nova Scotia	General Assembly	House of Assembly	Member of the Legislative Assembly (MLA)	Supreme Court	Premier	Lieutenant Governor
New Brunswick	Legislature	Legislative Assembly	Member of the Legislative Assembly (MLA)	Court of King's Bench	Premier	Lieutenant Governor
Manitoba	Legislature	Legislative Assembly	Member of the Legislative Assembly (MLA)	Court of King's Bench	Premier	Lieutenant Governor
British Columbia	Parliament	Legislative Assembly	Member of the Legislative Assembly (MLA)	Supreme Court	Premier	Lieutenant Governor
Prince Edward Island (Note: Prince Edward Island's lower house was previously called the "House of Assembly" and its members were titled "Assemblyman". After the abolition of its upper house, assemblymen and councillors both sat in the renamed "Legislative Assembly". Later, this practice was abolished so that all members would be titled "Member of the Legislative Assembly".)	General Assembly	Legislative Assembly	Member of the Legislative Assembly (MLA)	Supreme Court	Premier	Lieutenant Governor
Saskatchewan	Legislature	Legislative Assembly	Member of the Legislative Assembly (MLA)	Court of King's Bench	Premier	Lieutenant Governor
Alberta	Legislature	Legislative Assembly	Member of the Legislative Assembly (MLA)	Court of King's Bench	Premier	Lieutenant Governor
Newfoundland and Labrador	General Assembly	House of Assembly	Member of the House of Assembly (MHA)	Supreme Court	Premier	Lieutenant Governor
Northwest Territories	Assembly	Legislative Assembly	Member of the Legislative Assembly (MLA)	Supreme Court	Premier (Note: In Northwest Territories and Yukon the head of government was previously titled "Government Leader".)	Commissioner
Yukon	Legislature	Legislative Assembly	Member of the Legislative Assembly (MLA)	Supreme Court	Premier	Commissioner
Nunavut	Assembly	Legislative Assembly	Member of the Legislative Assembly (MLA)	Court of Justice	Premier	Commissioner

=== Provincial legislature buildings and flags ===
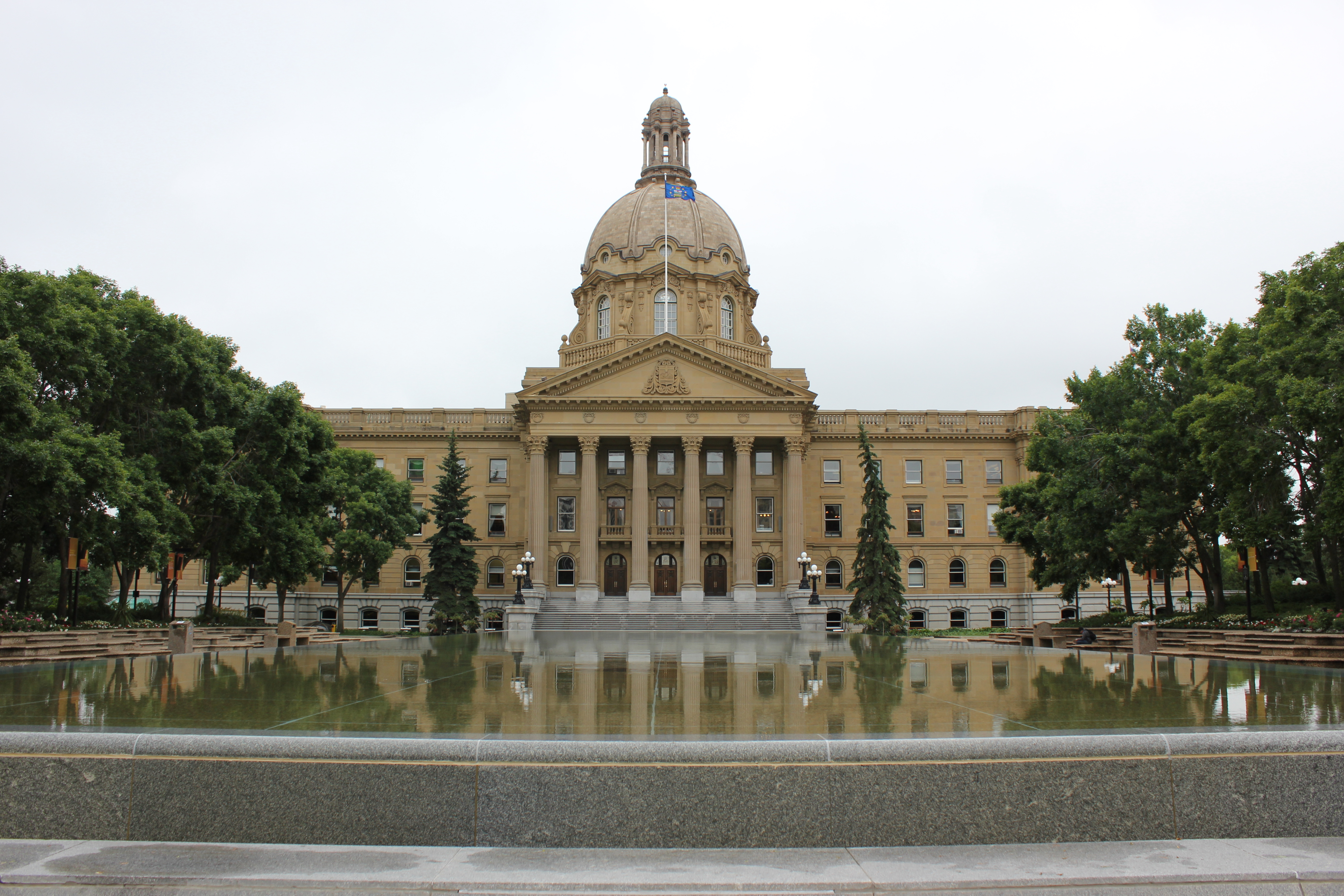
Alberta Legislature Building

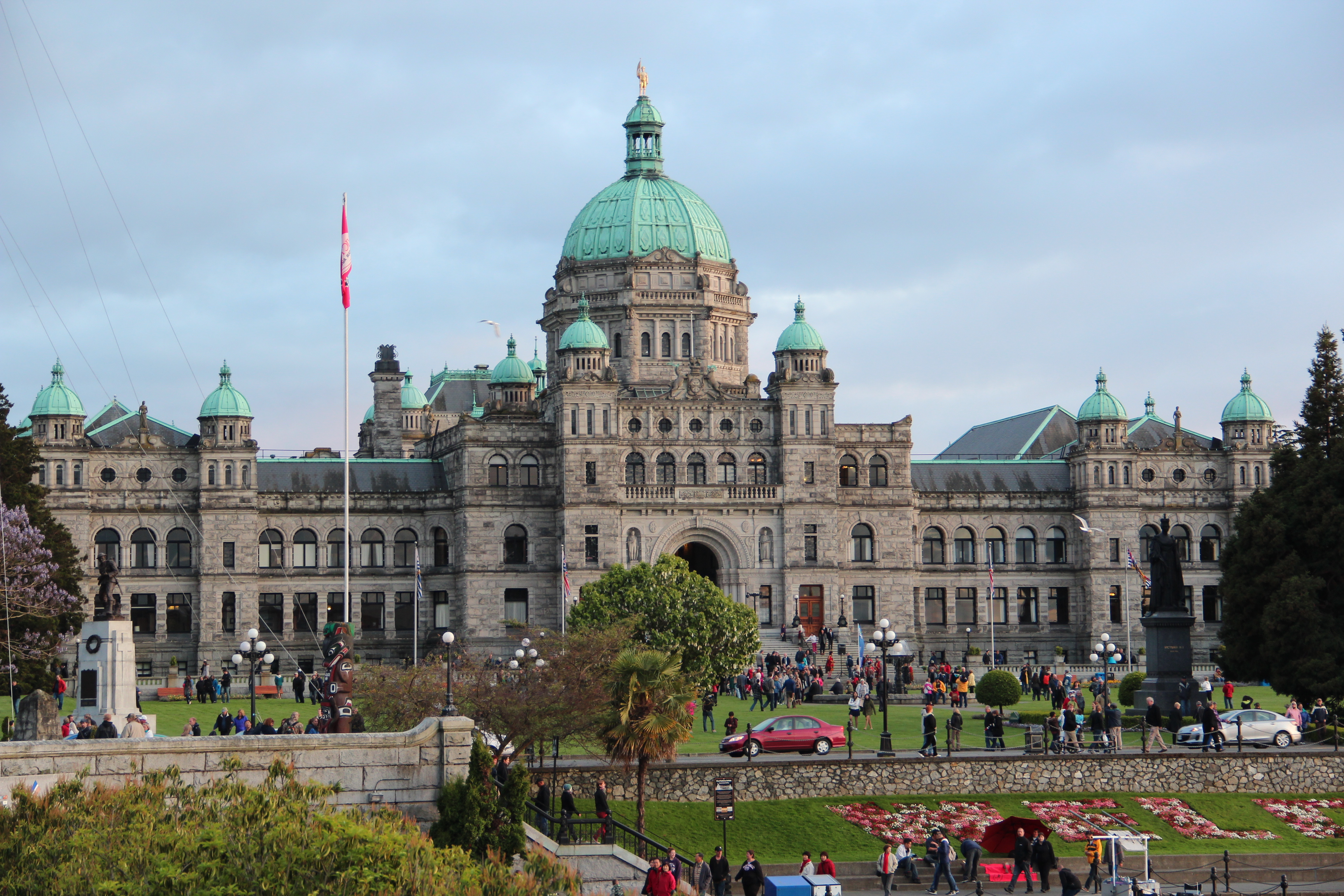
British Columbia Parliament Buildings

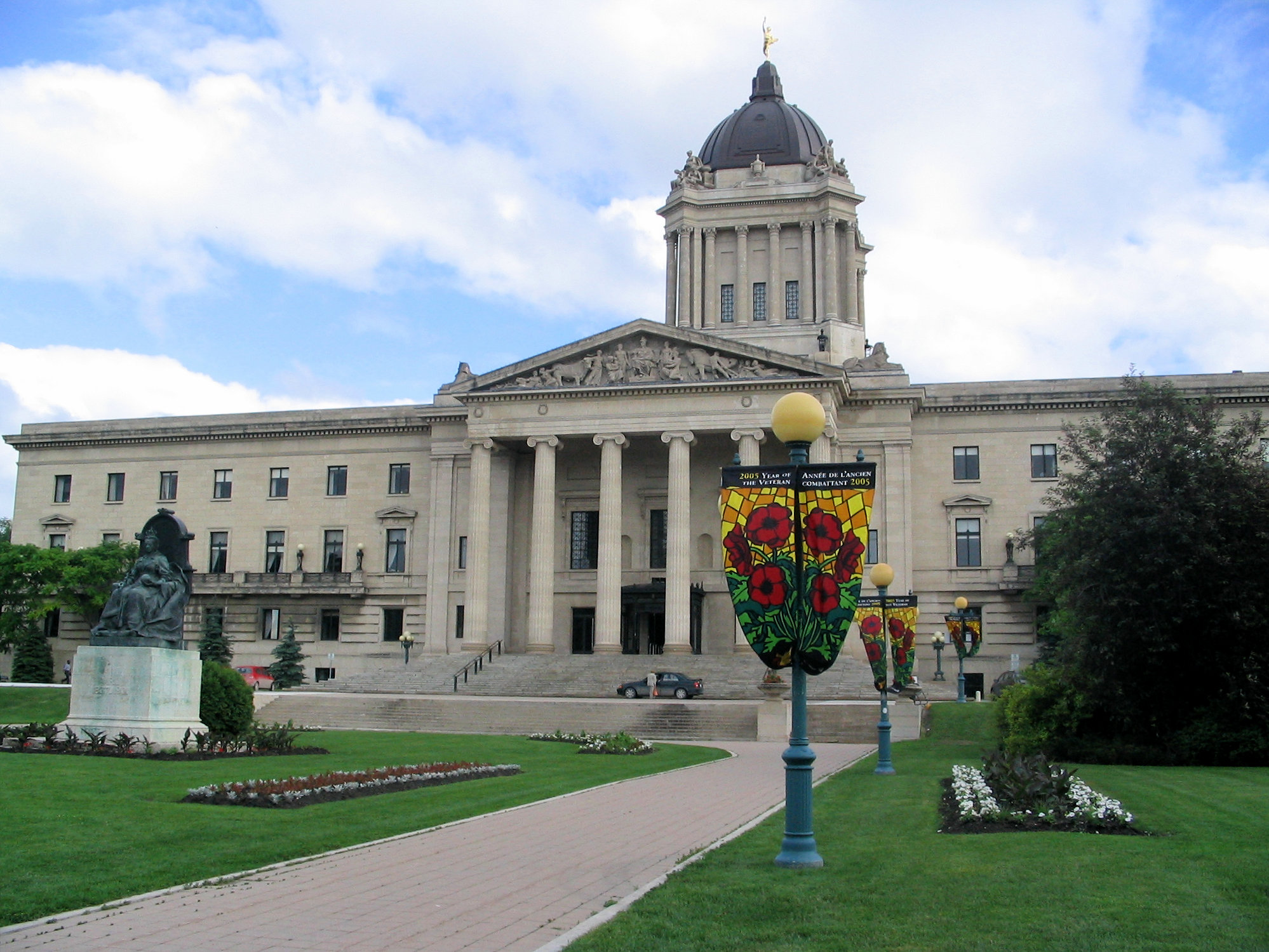
Manitoba Legislative Building

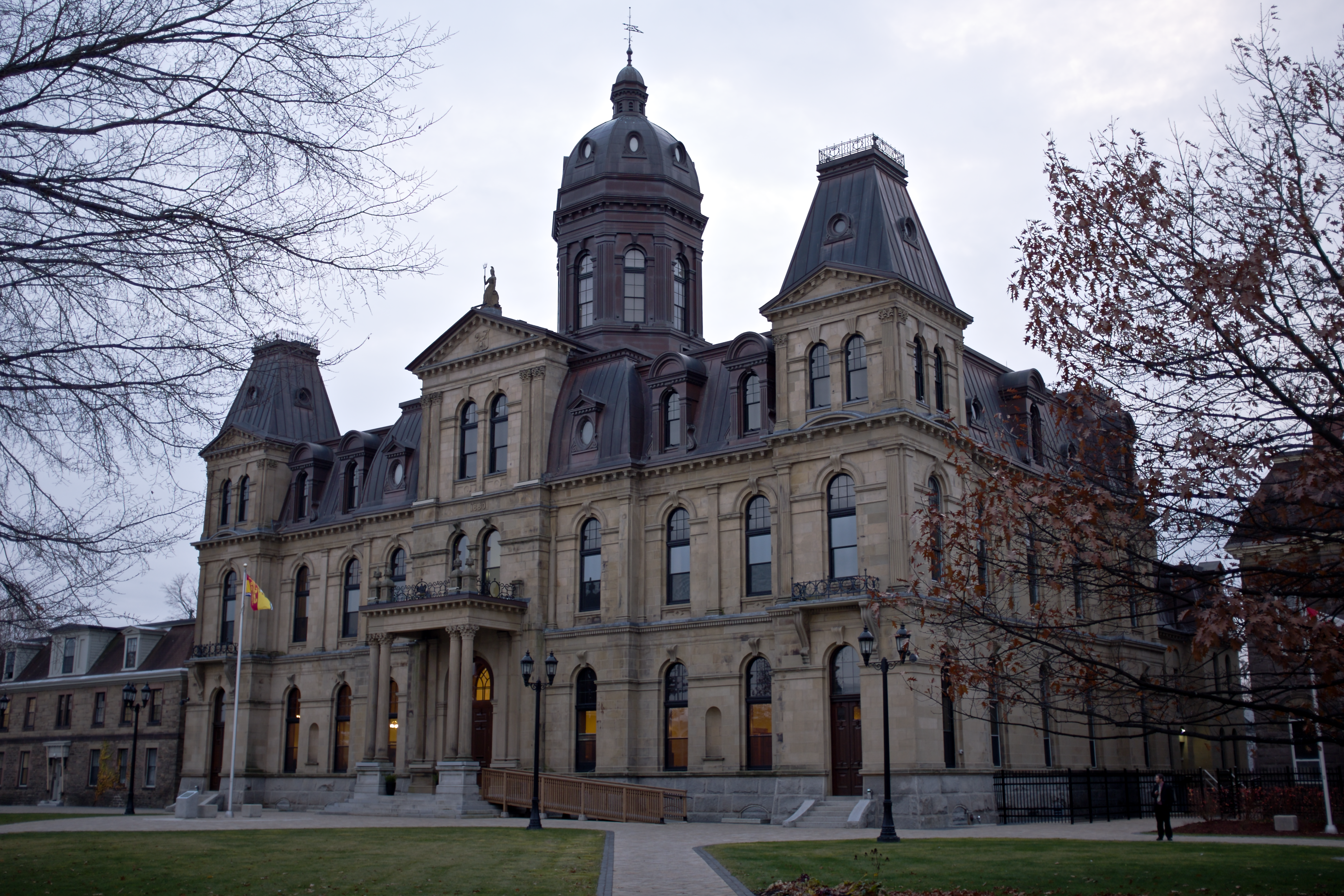
New Brunswick Legislative Building

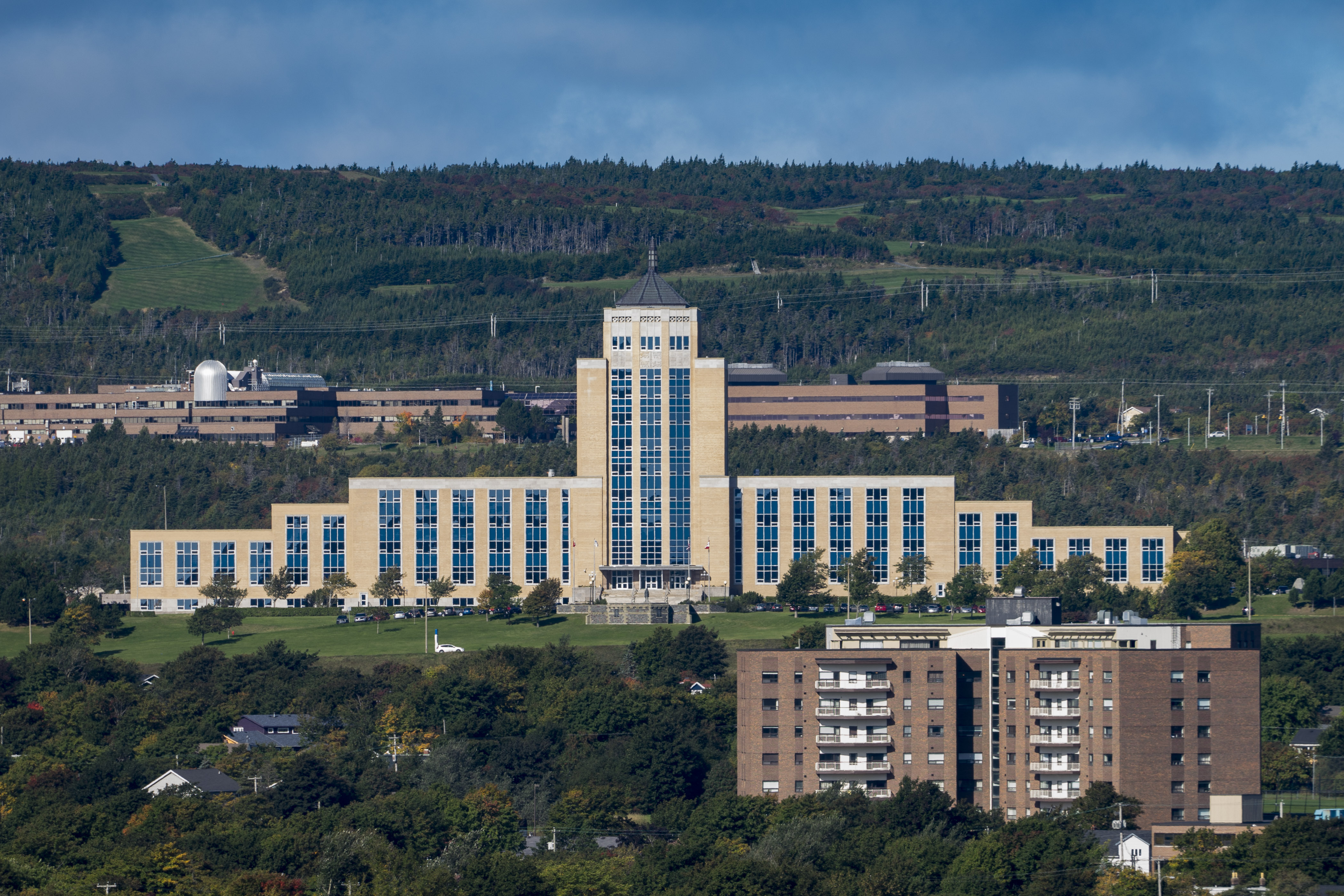
Newfoundland and Labrador Confederation Building

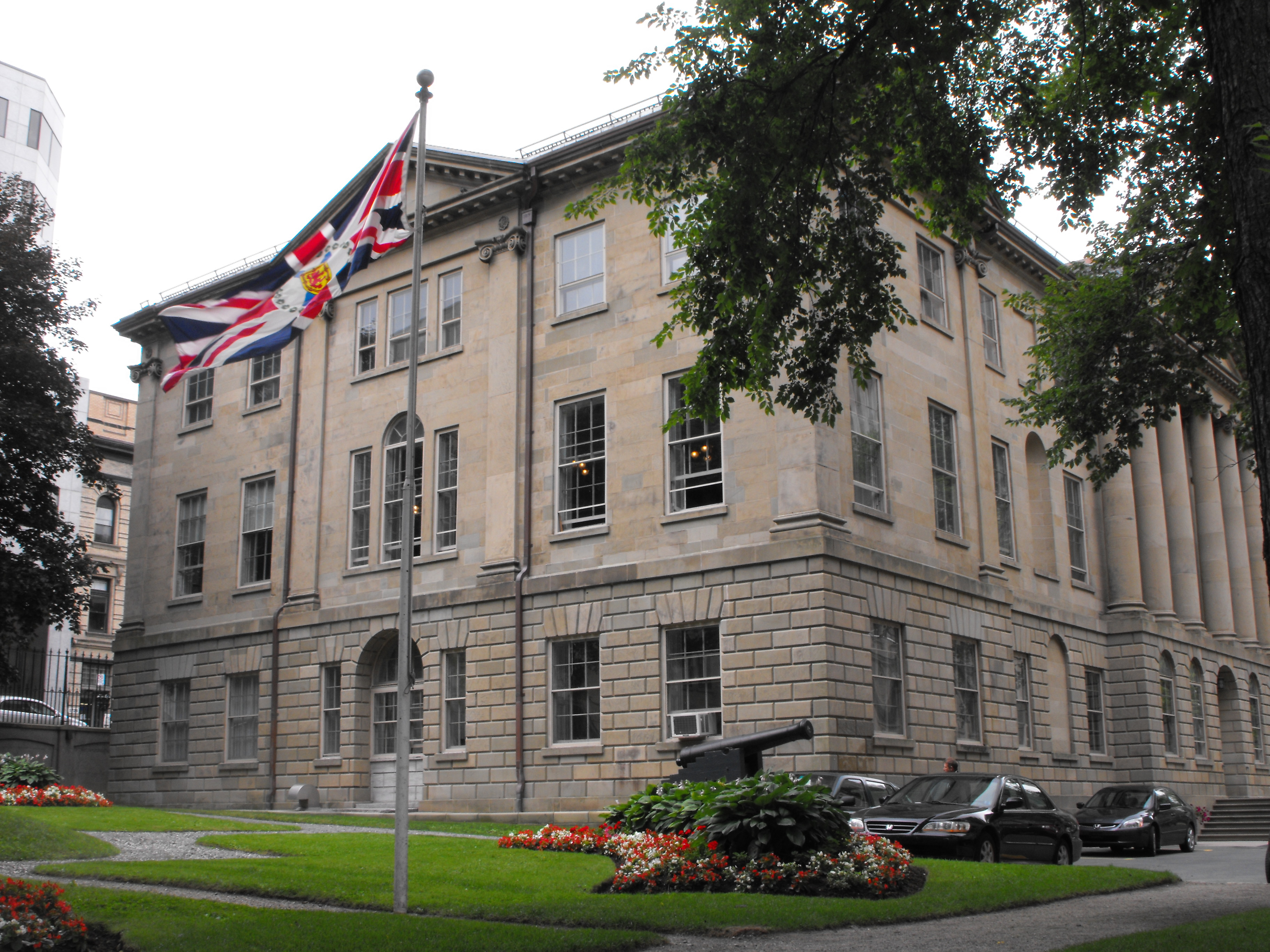
Nova Scotia Province House

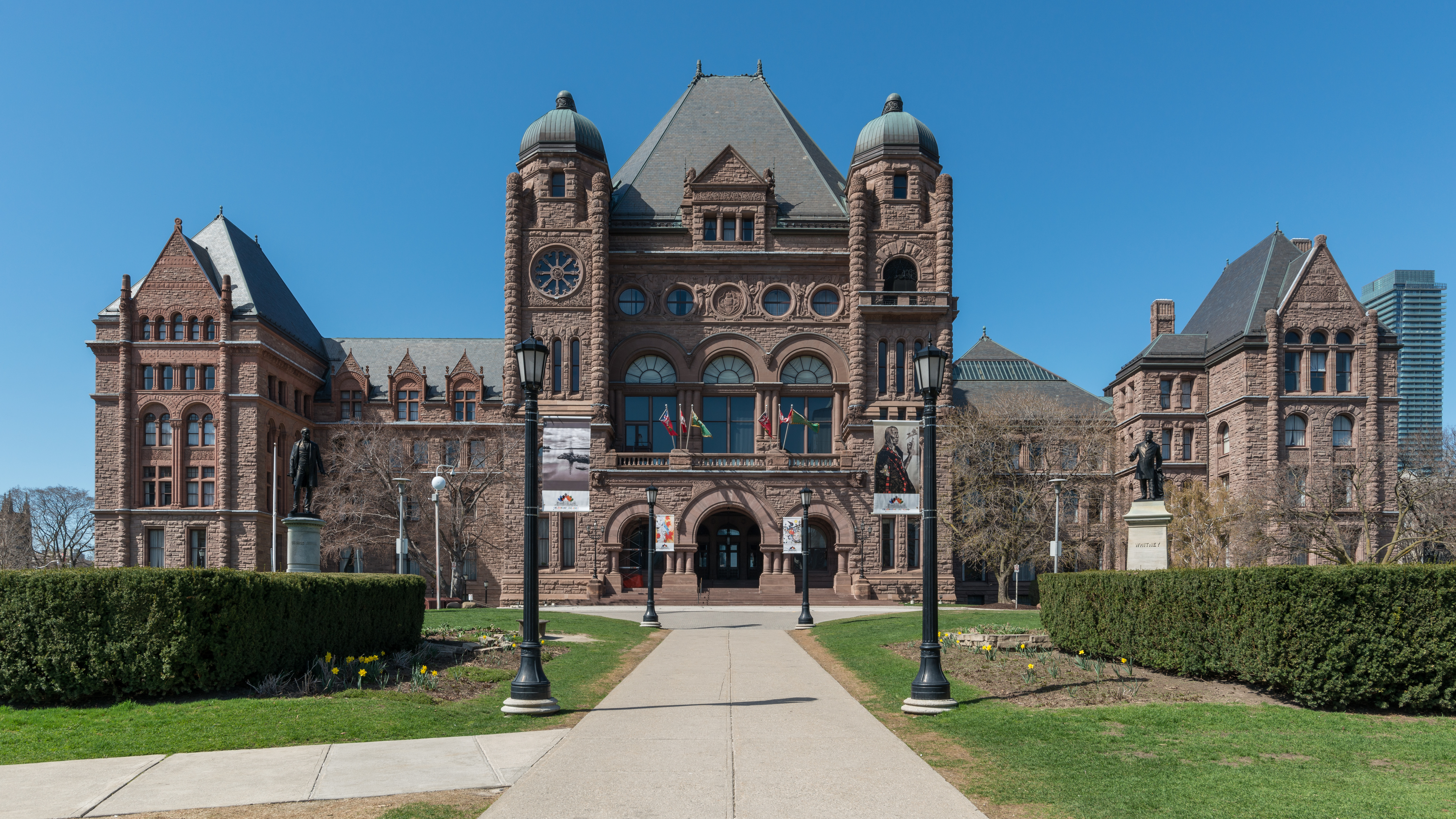
Ontario Legislative Building

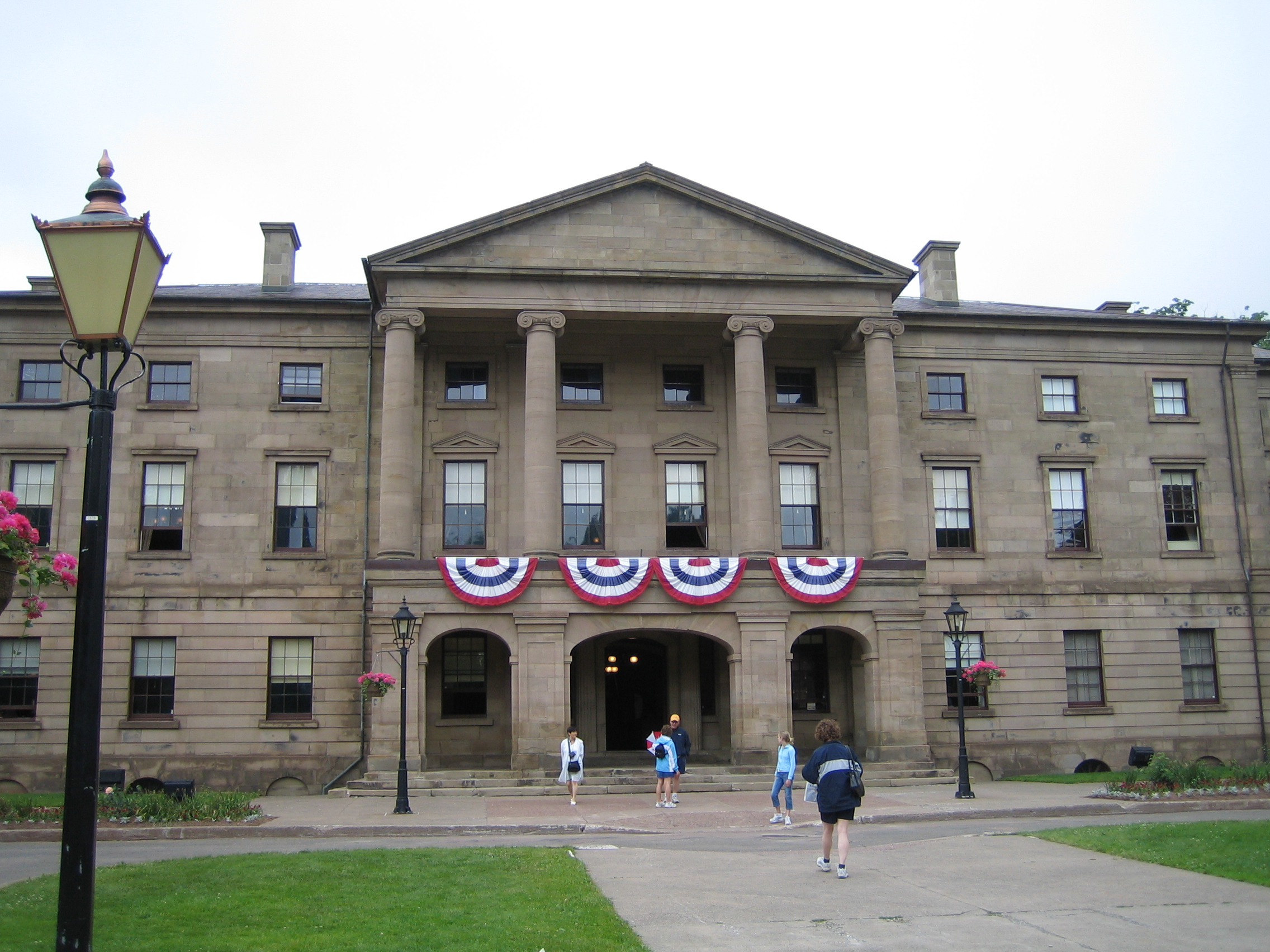
Prince Edward Island Province House

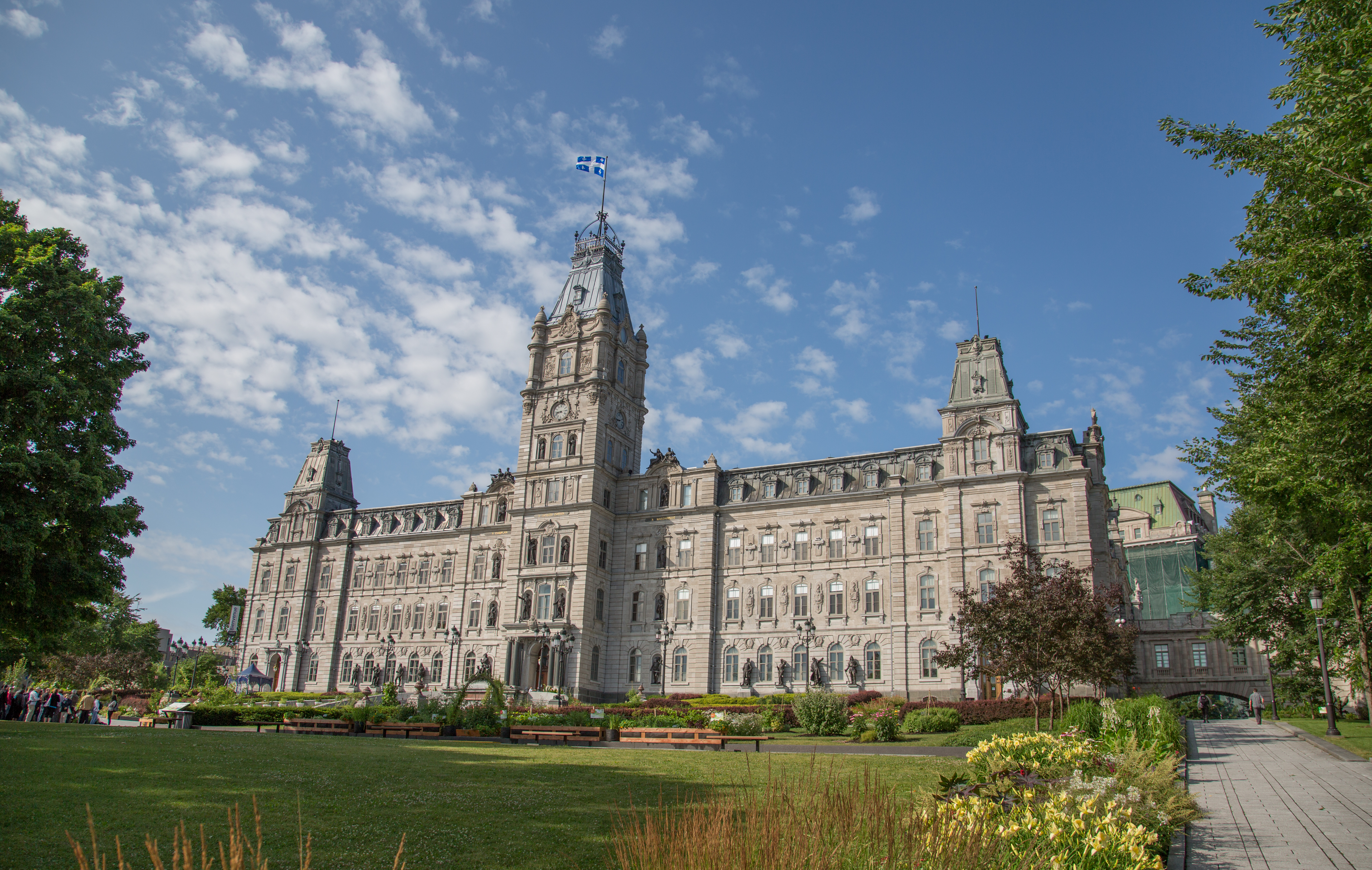
Quebec Parliament Building

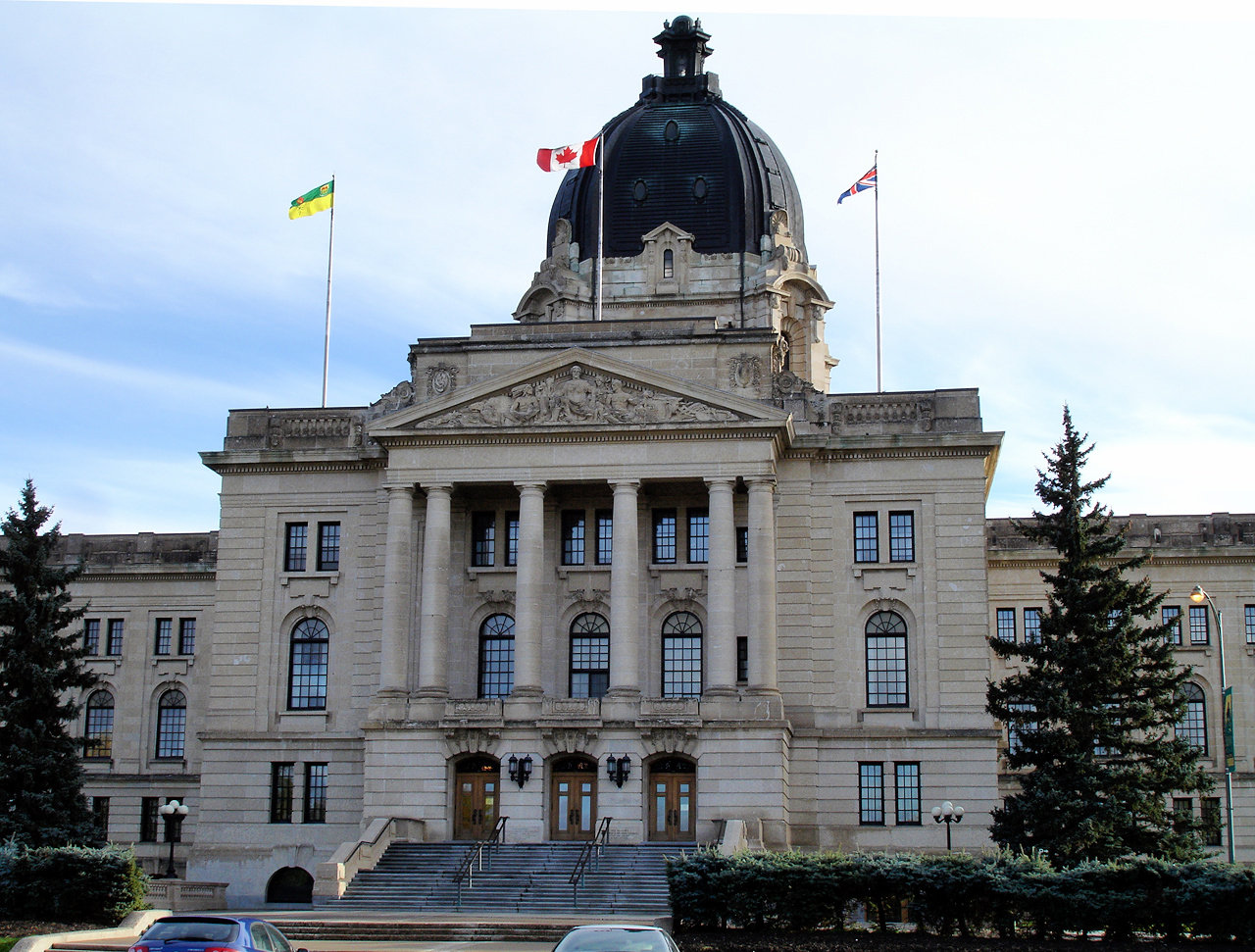
Saskatchewan Legislative Building

=== Provincial flags and coat of arms ===
Flag of Alberta

Coat of arms of Alberta

Flag of British Columbia

Coat of arms of British Columbia

Flag of Manitoba

Coat of arms of Manitoba

Flag of New Brunswick

Coat of arms of New Brunswick

Flag of Newfoundland and Labrador

Coat of arms of Newfoundland and Labrador

Flag of Nova Scotia

Coat of arms of Nova Scotia

Flag of Ontario

Coat of arms of Ontario

Flag of Prince Edward Island

Coat of arms of Prince Edward Island

Flag of Quebec

Coat of arms of Quebec

Flag of Saskatchewan

Coat of arms of Saskatchewan

=== Territorial legislature buildings and flags ===
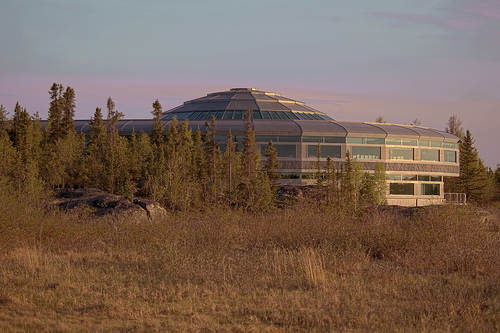
Northwest Territories Legislative Building

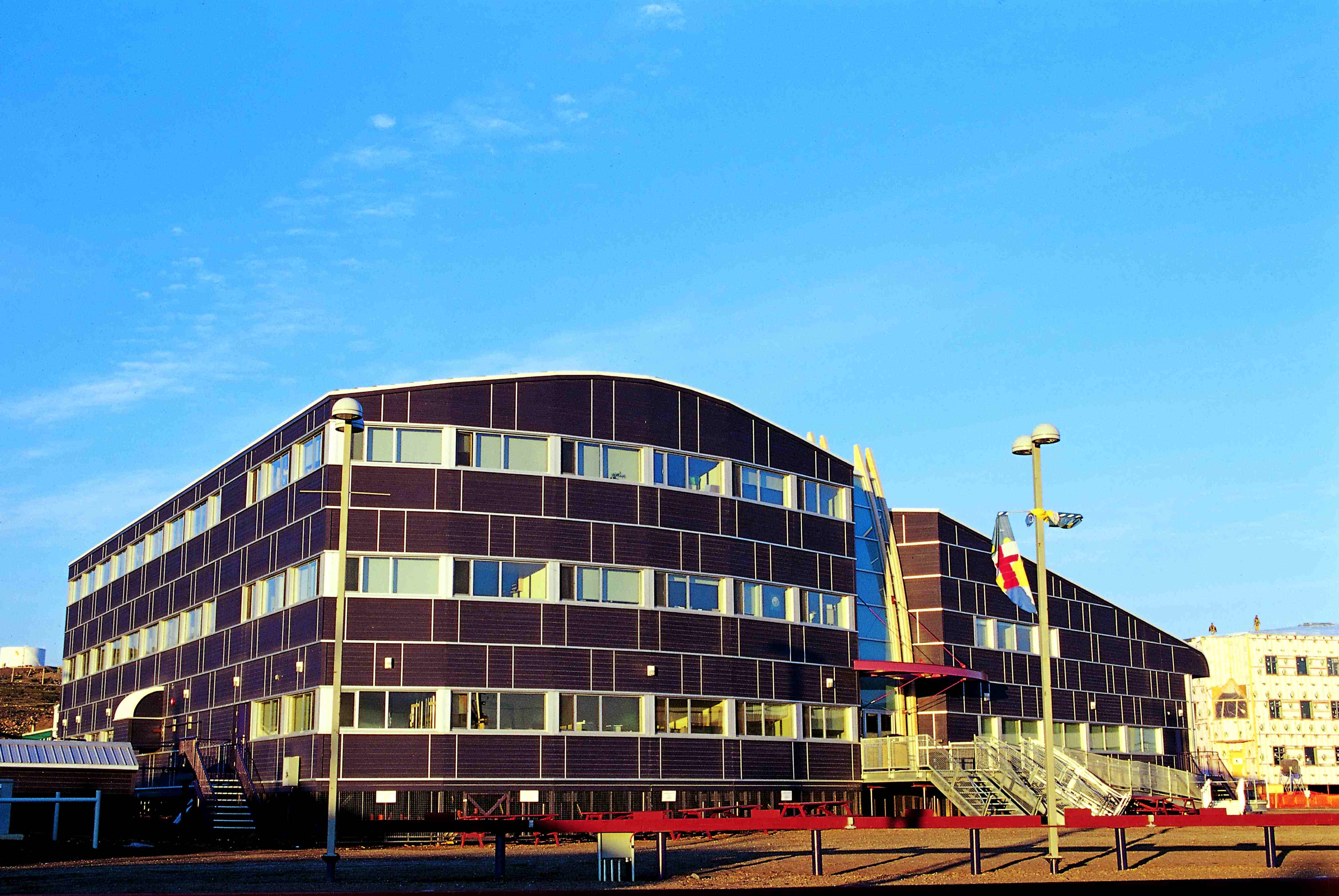
Nunavut Legislative Building

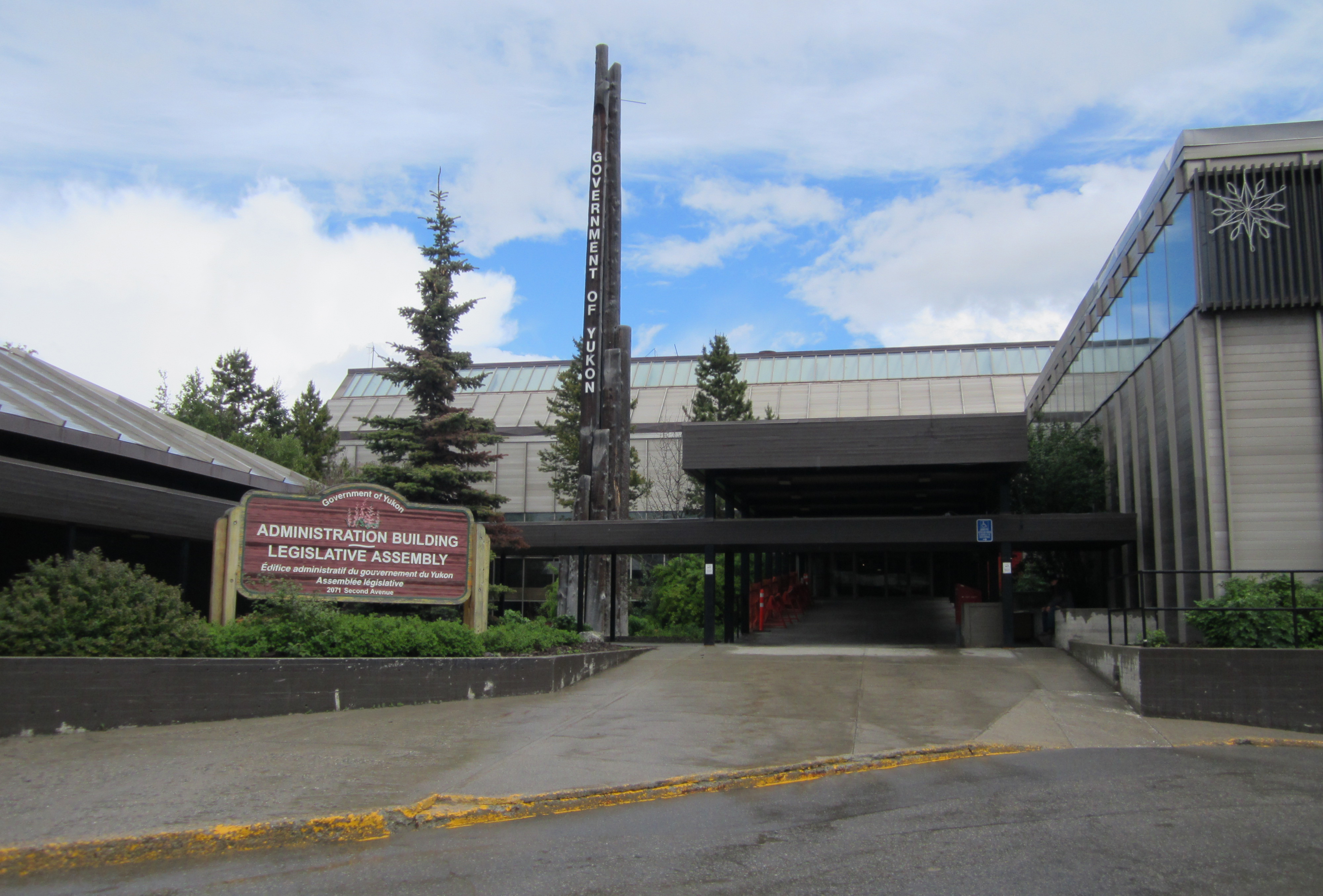
Yukon Legislative Building

=== Territorial flags and coat of arms ===
Flag of the Northwest Territories

Coat of arms of the Northwest Territories

Flag of Nunavut

Coat of arms of Nunavut

Flag of Yukon

Coat of arms of Yukon

=== Map ===
Clickable map of Canada exhibiting its ten provinces and three territories, and their capitals

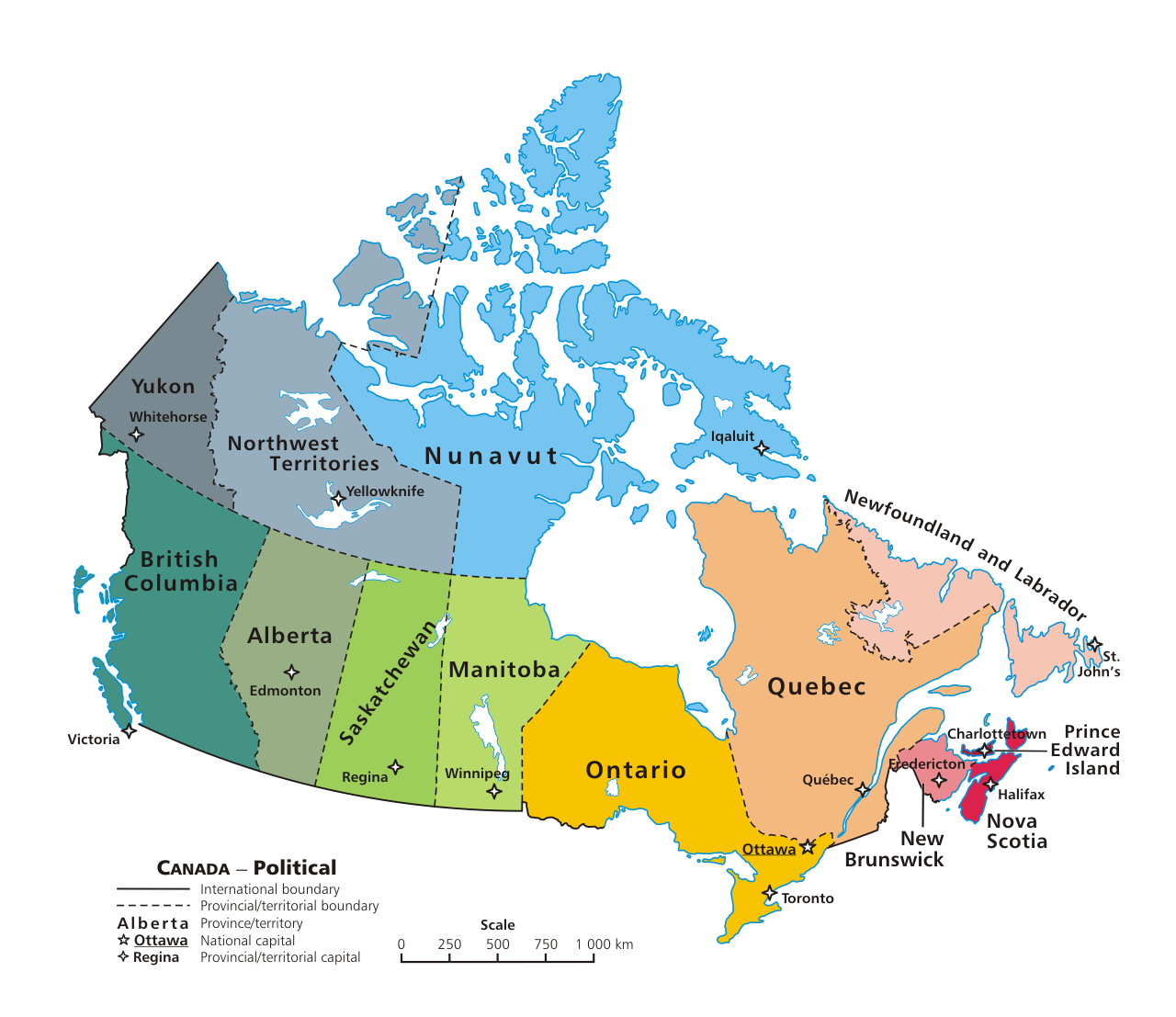
A clickable map of Canada exhibiting its ten provinces and three territories, and their capitals.

== Provincial political parties ==
Most provinces have rough provincial counterparts to major federal parties. However, these provincial parties are not usually formally linked to the federal parties that share the same name. For example, no provincial Conservative or Progressive Conservative Party shares an organizational link to the federal Conservative Party of Canada, and neither do provincial Green Parties to the Green Party of Canada.

Provincial New Democratic Parties, on the other hand, are fully integrated with the federal New Democratic Party—meaning that provincial parties effectively operate as sections, with common membership, of the federal party.

The Liberal Party of Canada shares such an organizational integration with Atlantic Canada provincial Liberals in New Brunswick, Newfoundland and Labrador, Nova Scotia, and Prince Edward Island. Other provincial Liberal parties are unaffiliated with their federal counterpart.

Some provinces have provincial political parties with no clear federal equivalent, such as the Saskatchewan Party.

The provincial political climate of Quebec is different: the main split is between sovereignty, represented by the Parti Québécois and Québec solidaire, and federalism, represented primarily by the Quebec Liberal Party. The Coalition Avenir Québec, meanwhile, takes an abstentionist position on the question and does not support or oppose sovereignty.

=== Provincial/territorial governments ===
Provincial/territorial governments of Canada
Province/territory	Premier	Party in government	Party main ideology	Party political position	Majority/minority	Party in Opposition	Lieutenant governor / commissioner	Last election	Next election
Alberta	Danielle Smith	United Conservative	Conservatism (Canadian)	Right-wing	Majority	New Democratic	Salma Lakhani	2023	2027
British Columbia	David Eby	New Democratic	Social democracy	Centre-left	Legislature dissolved	Conservative	Wendy Lisogar-Cocchia	2026	2030
Manitoba	Wab Kinew	New Democratic	Social democracy	Centre-left	Majority	Progressive Conservative	Anita Neville	2023	2027
New Brunswick	Susan Holt	Liberal	Liberalism (Canadian)	Centre to centre-left	Majority	Progressive Conservative	Louise Imbeault	2024	2028
Newfoundland and Labrador	Tony Wakeham	Progressive Conservative	Progressive conservatism	Centre-right	Majority	Liberal	Joan Marie Aylward	2025	2029
Nova Scotia	Tim Houston	Progressive Conservative	Red Toryism	Centre-right	Majority	New Democratic	Mike Savage	2024	2029
Ontario	Doug Ford	Progressive Conservative	Conservatism (Canadian)	Centre-right	Majority	New Democratic	Edith Dumont	2025	2029
Prince Edward Island	Rob Lantz	Progressive Conservative	Progressive conservatism	Centre to centre-right	Majority	Liberal	Wassim Salamoun	2023	2027
Quebec	Paul St-Pierre Plamondon	Parti Québécois	Quebec nationalism	Centre-left	Minority	Liberal	Manon Jeannotte	2026	2030
Saskatchewan	Scott Moe	Saskatchewan Party	Conservatism (Canadian)	Centre-right to right-wing	Majority	New Democratic	Bernadette McIntyre	2024	2028
Northwest Territories	R.J. Simpson	Nonpartisan consensus government				N/A	Gerald Kisoun	2023	2027
Nunavut	John Main	Nonpartisan consensus government				N/A	Eva Aariak	2025	2029
Yukon	Currie Dixon	Yukon Party	Conservatism (Canadian)	Centre-right	Majority	New Democratic	Adeline Webber	2025	2029

Provincial party standings at the district level across Canada as of November 2025

== Ceremonial territory ==
The Canadian National Vimy Memorial, near Vimy, Pas-de-Calais, and the Beaumont-Hamel Newfoundland Memorial, near Beaumont-Hamel, both in France, are ceremonially considered Canadian territory. In 1922, the French government donated the land used for the Vimy Memorial "freely, and for all time, to the Government of Canada the free use of the land exempt from all taxes".

In 1921, the site of the Somme battlefield near Beaumont-Hamel site was purchased by the people of the Dominion of Newfoundland. These sites do not enjoy extraterritorial status and are subject to French law.

== Proposed provinces and territories ==
Since Confederation in 1867, there have been several proposals for new Canadian provinces and territories. The Constitution of Canada requires an amendment for the creation of a new province. The creation of a new territory requires only an act of Parliament, a legislatively simpler process.

In late 2004, Prime Minister Paul Martin surprised some observers by expressing his personal support for all three territories gaining provincial status "eventually". He cited their importance to Canada as a whole and the ongoing need to assert sovereignty in the Arctic, particularly as global warming could make that region more open to exploitation, leading to more complex international waters disputes.

== See also ==
- List of Canadian provincial and territorial name etymologies
  - Canadian adjectival and demonymic forms of place names
- Language policies of Canada's provinces and territories
- List of areas disputed by Canada and the United States
- List of regions in Canada
- List of governments in Canada by annual expenditures
- Commonwealth Local Government Forum
- Provincial and territorial museums of Canada
- List of Canada-related topics by provinces and territories
  - List of Canadian provinces and territories by gross domestic product
  - List of Canadian provincial and territorial symbols
  - List of Canadian provinces by unemployment rate
  - List of Canadian provinces and territories by Human Development Index
  - Population of Canada by province and territory
  - List of Canadian flags
