= List of Canadian provinces and territories by gross domestic product =

Map of the Canadian provinces and territories by GDP in millions of Canadian dollars in 2024: > 1,000,000; > 500,000; > 300,000; > 80,000; > 40,000; < 15,000

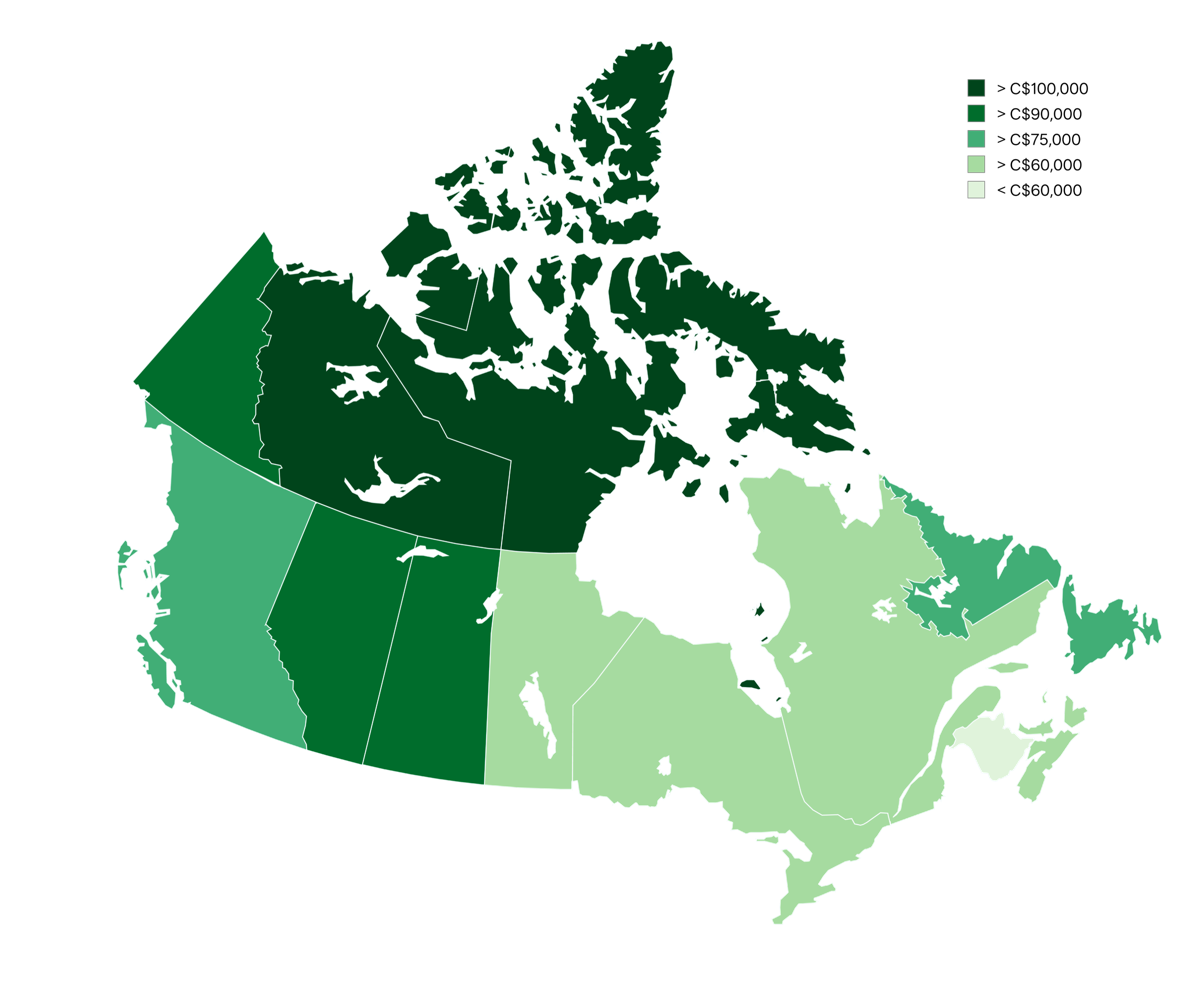
Map of Canadian provinces and territories by GDP per Capita (2024)

This article lists Canadian provinces and territories by gross domestic product (GDP).

While Canada's ten provinces and three territories exhibit high per capita GDPs, there is wide variation among them. Ontario, the country's most populous province, is a major manufacturing and trade hub with extensive linkages to the northeastern and midwestern United States. The economies of Alberta, Saskatchewan, Newfoundland and Labrador and the territories rely heavily on natural resources. On the other hand, Manitoba, Quebec and The Maritimes have the country's lowest per capita GDP values, though this is due, in part, to lower price levels in those provinces.

In the face of these long-term regional disparities, the Government of Canada redistributes some of its revenues through unconditional equalization payments and finances the delivery of comparable levels of government services through the Canada Health Transfer and the Canada Social Transfer. However, these payments are based on nominal fiscal capacity and therefore do not account for differences in the cost of service delivery across the country. As of 2025, provinces receiving the largest equalization transfers per capita have relatively low price levels, so equalization may push their true (accounting for cost differences) fiscal capacity above that of some provinces receiving little or no equalization.

== GDP and per capita GDP, 2025 ==
A table listing total GDP (expenditure-based), share of Canadian GDP, population, and per capita GDP in 2025. For illustrative purposes, market income (total income less government transfers) per capita from tax returns is included. (The per capita, rather than per tax filer, measure is chosen for comparability with GDP per capita.)

Province or territory	GDP (million CAD, 2025)	Share of national GDP (%, 2025)	Population (July 1, 2025)	GDP per capita (CAD, 2025)	Market income per capita (CAD, 2023)
Canada	3,247,208	100.00	41,608,982	78,041	41,491
Alberta	482,370	14.85	5,024,631	96,001	44,916
British Columbia	448,072	13.80	5,702,544	78,574	44,337
Manitoba	100,781	3.10	1,508,582	66,805	34,604
Newfoundland and Labrador	43,749	1.35	550,202	79,514	35,599
New Brunswick	52,357	1.61	874,711	59,856	33,631
Northwest Territories	5,067	0.16	46,031	110,078	49,323
Nova Scotia	69,929	2.15	1,095,157	63,853	36,096
Nunavut	7,202	0.22	42,108	171,036	30,063
Ontario	1,258,597	38.76	16,216,961	77,610	42,740
Prince Edward Island	11,469	0.35	181,594	63,157	34,093
Quebec	646,481	19.91	9,051,022	71,426	39,294
Saskatchewan	115,561	3.56	1,266,289	91,260	37,231
Yukon	4,666	0.14	49,150	94,934	50,477

Source: Statistics Canada: GDP (totals), Population, Total income and government transfers, Population covered by income data

== International comparisons, 2025 ==
In the table below, the figures from the previous table are converted to international dollars using the ratio of the International Monetary Fund's estimate for Canada's GDP by purchasing power parity (PPP) to Canada's nominal GDP. The per capita GDP PPP for the relevant year of other advanced economies with a population of at least 15 million according to the International Monetary Fund is provided as comparison.

(Note that because the same conversion rate is used for all of Canada, this method overstates the GDP PPP of provinces and territories with high price levels, and understates the GDP PPP of provinces and territories with low price levels.)

#	Province or territory	GDP PPP per capita (Int$ PPP, 2024)	GDP PPP (million Int$ PPP, 2024)
13	Canada	67,042	2,789,540
14	Ontario	66,671	1,081,208
19	Quebec	61,359	555,365
6	Alberta	82,470	414,384
12	British Columbia	67,500	384,920
8	Saskatchewan	78,397	99,274
20	Manitoba	57,389	86,577
23	Nova Scotia	54,853	60,073
25	New Brunswick	51,420	44,978
11	Newfoundland and Labrador	68,308	37,583
24	Prince Edward Island	54,256	9,853
2	Northwest Territories	94,563	4,353
1	Nunavut	146,930	6,187
7	Yukon	81,554	4,008
10	Australia	72,108	1,999,618
15	France	66,559	4,582,699
9	Germany	74,901	6,255,150
18	Italy	63,508	3,742,786
22	Japan	57,043	7,032,894
17	South Korea	65,685	3,394,879
5	Netherlands	84,445	1,523,729
21	Spain	57,282	2,832,758
4	Taiwan	90,256	2,102,892
16	United Kingdom	65,758	4,569,342
3	United States	90,267	30,861,292

Source: International Monetary Fund World Economic Outlook Database, October 2026

== Real GDP at basic prices, 2014–2018 ==
A table listing annual GDP at basic prices from 2014 through 2018 in chained 2012 dollars. Caution: GDP at basic prices differs from GDP in the treatment of taxes and subsidies.

Province or territory	GDP (million chained (2012) CAD, 2014)	GDP (million chained (2012) CAD, 2015)	GDP (million chained (2012) CAD, 2016)	GDP (million chained (2012) CAD, 2017)	GDP (million chained (2012) CAD, 2018)
British Columbia	219,060.9	224,153.4	231,509.9	240,657.9	246,506.3
Alberta	338,262.6	326,476.7	313,241.5	327,596.2	335,095.6
Saskatchewan	80,175.7	79,574.2	79,364.4	81,179.0	82,502.7
Manitoba	58,276.3	59,082.5	60,066.2	61,941.2	62,723.1
Ontario	659,861.2	677,384.0	693,900.4	712,984.3	728,363.7
Quebec	338,319.0	341,688.0	346,713.7	356,677.9	365,614.4
New Brunswick	29,039.6	29,275.7	29,686.3	30,271.8	30,295.3
Prince Edward Island	5,205.6	5,280.7	5,372.2	5,553.3	5,700.0
Nova Scotia	34,747.2	35,013.4	35,549.3	36,075.4	36,518.2
Newfoundland and Labrador	31,143.3	30,806.0	31,334.5	31,610.6	30,757.9
Yukon	2,510.9	2,320.2	2,482.5	2,554.5	2,626.1
Northwest Territories	4,574.6	4,621.3	4,679.8	4,861.3	4,954.7
Nunavut	2,363.6	2,353.0	2,434.3	2,685.3	2,955.0

Source: Statistics Canada

== Components of GDP, 2023 ==
A table of Canadian provinces and territories by descending GDP (at current prices and expenditure-based); all figures are from Statistics Canada.

Province or territory	GDP (million CAD, 2023)	= Final consumption expenditure	+ Gross capital formation	+ Investment in Inventories	+ Exports	− Imports
Canada	2,933,810	2,230,737	670,466	30,565	1,510,372	1,508,395
British Columbia	409,881	326,562	114,662	6,007	153,846	191,308
Alberta	452,410	265,690	107,706	340	288,480	209,784
Saskatchewan	109,702	68,108	23,204	−461	80,080	61,304
Manitoba	91,872	81,361	17,265	1,474	49,037	57,240
Ontario	1,119,545	855,991	245,689	12,590	580,715	575,407
Quebec	579,460	467,884	122,978	7,844	272,849	291,995
New Brunswick	47,035	46,565	9,407	1,069	32,145	42,166
Prince Edward Island	9,924	9,519	2,010	140	4,683	6,438
Nova Scotia	59,574	62,423	13,462	446	20,746	37,528
Newfoundland and Labrador	38,959	31,462	9,662	285	20,081	22,539
Yukon	4,330	4,179	1,412	99	1,172	2,533
Northwest Territories	5,478	5,491	1,158	211	3,190	4,573
Nunavut	4,825	3,713	1,824	520	3,347	4,580

Figures may not add up precisely due to omission of the statistical discrepancy column and the "Outside Canada" row.

== Census metropolitan areas (CMA) by GDP at basic prices, 2021 ==
This is a list of Canadian metropolitan areas by their gross domestic product (GDP) at basic prices according to data by Statistics Canada.

Rank	Census metropolitan areas	GDP (million CAD, 2021)	GDP per capita (CAD, 2021)
1	Toronto (Census Metropolitan Area)	473,663	73,176
2	Montreal (Census Metropolitan Area)	253,901	58,636
3	Vancouver (Census Metropolitan Area)	183,140	66,081
4	Calgary (Census Metropolitan Area)	115,136	74,752
5	Ottawa–Gatineau (Census Metropolitan Area)	98,693	64,072
6	Edmonton (Census Metropolitan Area)	93,271	63,346
7	Quebec (Census Metropolitan Area)	52,555	62,212
8	Winnipeg (Census Metropolitan Area)	48,388	56,250
9	Hamilton (Census Metropolitan Area)	41,169	50,343
10	Tri-Cities (Census Metropolitan Area)	37,144	61,670
11	London (Census Metropolitan Area)	30,635	53,979
12	Halifax (Census Metropolitan Area)	26,967	55,931
13	Victoria (Census Metropolitan Area)	24,285	58,575
14	Saskatoon (Census Metropolitan Area)	21,859	66,591
15	Regina (Census Metropolitan Area)	19,637	76,299
16	St. Catharines – Niagara (Census Metropolitan Area)	18,716	41,506
17	Windsor (Census Metropolitan Area)	18,026	41,017
18	Oshawa (Census Metropolitan Area)	14,814	34,171
19	St. John's (Census Metropolitan Area)	13,744	62,458
20	Kelowna (Census Metropolitan Area)	12,278	52,888
21	Guelph (Census Metropolitan Area)	11,839	68,483
22	Sherbrooke (Census Metropolitan Area)	10,326	45,034
23	Sudbury (Census Metropolitan Area)	10,324	58,191
24	Saguenay (Census Metropolitan Area)	10,143	62,466
25	Kingston (Census Metropolitan Area)	10,132	56,381
26	Barrie (Census Metropolitan Area)	9,557	43,037
27	Abbotsford – Mission (Census Metropolitan Area)	9,294	45,410
28	Moncton (Census Metropolitan Area)	8,893	55,107
29	Trois-Rivières (Census Metropolitan Area)	7,649	47,062
30	Thunder Bay (Census Metropolitan Area)	7,256	56,670
31	Lethbridge (Census Metropolitan Area)	7,071	55,026
32	Kamloops (Census Metropolitan Area)	6,916	58,094
33	Saint John (Census Metropolitan Area)	6,800	51,074
34	Brantford (Census Metropolitan Area)	6,731	42,951
35	Fredericton (Census Metropolitan Area)	6,286	56,622
36	Nanaimo (Census Metropolitan Area)	5,789	48,156
37	Red Deer (Census Metropolitan Area)	5,781	55,358
38	Belleville (Census Metropolitan Area)	5,640	48,834
39	Peterborough (Census Metropolitan Area)	5,381	40,259
40	Drummondville (Census Metropolitan Area)	4,959	48,449
41	Chilliwack (Census Metropolitan Area)	4,826	40,680

== See also ==
- Economy of Canada
- List of Canadian provinces by unemployment rate
