= List of governments in Canada by annual expenditures =

In Canada, governments at the federal, provincial, territorial and municipal levels have the power to spend public funds. This is a list of governments by annual expenditures, in Canadian dollars.

Rank	Name	Level of government	Total expenditure	Per-capita expenditure	Fiscal year	Source
1	Canada	Federal	338,500,000,000		2018-19	
2	Ontario	Provincial	158,464,500,000		2018-19	
3	Quebec	Provincial	108,693,000,000		2018-19	
4	Alberta	Provincial	56,181,000,000		2018-19	
5	British Columbia	Provincial	53,600,000,000		2018-19	
6	Manitoba	Provincial	17,423,000,000		2018-19	
7	Toronto	Municipal	16,997,199,000		2018-19	
8	Saskatchewan	Provincial	14,608,800,000		2018-19	
9	Nova Scotia	Provincial	10,862,621,000		2018-19	
10	New Brunswick	Provincial	9,616,000,000		2018-19	
11	Newfoundland and Labrador	Provincial	8,287,156,100		2018-19	
12	Montreal	Municipal	7,804,100,000		2018-19	
23	Calgary	Municipal	5,635,000,000		2019-22	
22	Edmonton	Municipal	4,559,080,000		2019-22	
13	Ottawa	Municipal	4,149,400,000		2018-19	
14	Prince Edward Island	Provincial	1,983,933,000		2018-19	
15	Nunavut	Territorial	1,863,761,000		2018-19	
16	Northwest Territories	Territorial	1,725,931,000		2018-19	
20	Vancouver	Municipal	1,595,600,000	1,610	2018	
17	Winnipeg	Municipal	1,204,369,000		2010	
18	Yukon	Territorial	1,340,800,000		2018-19	
19	London	Municipal	994,800,000	2,700	2013	
21	Mississauga	Municipal	865,800,000	1,200	2010	
