= List of Canadian provinces by unemployment rate =

Unemployment rate for Canadian provinces

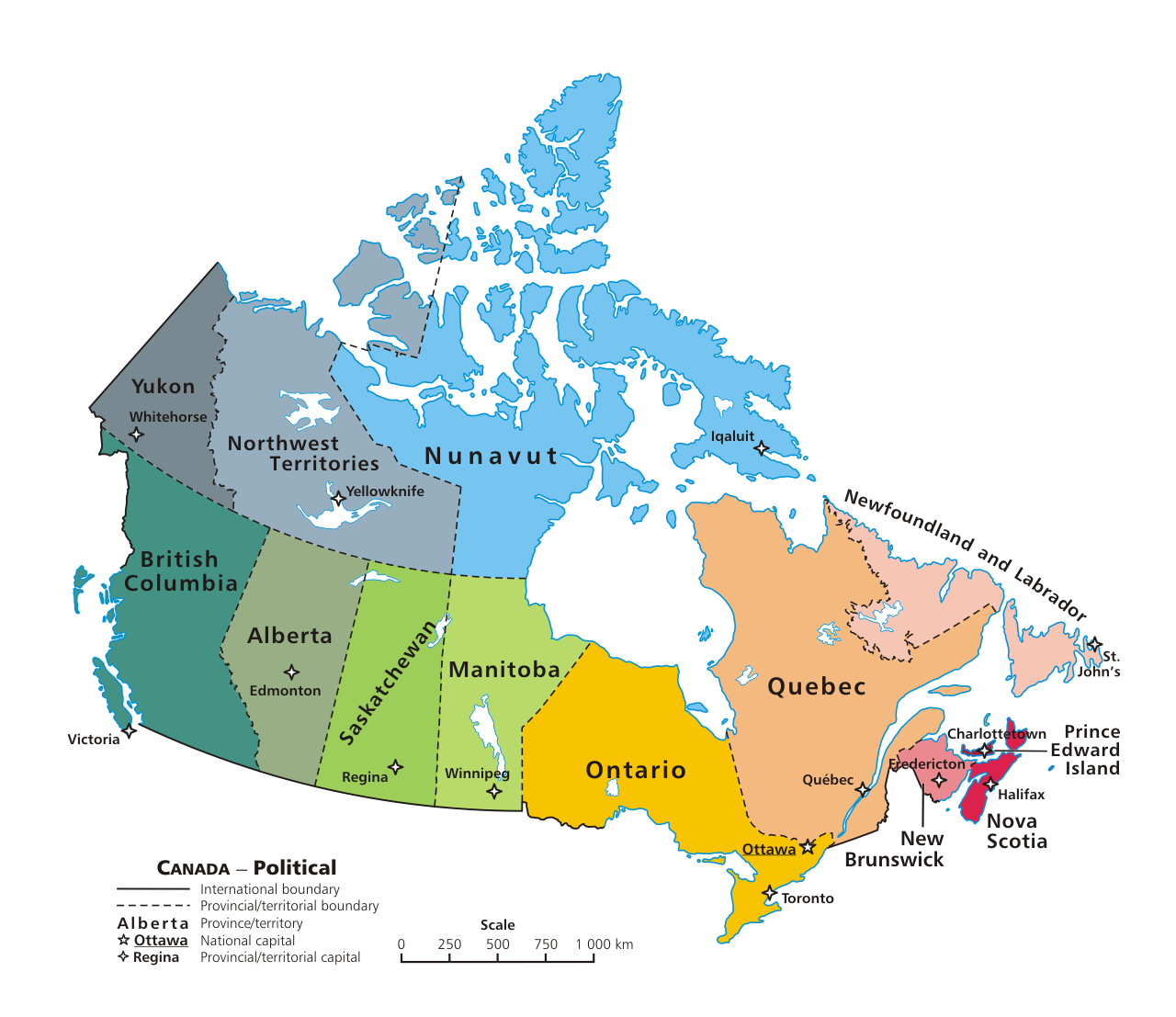

The list of Canadian provinces by unemployment rate are statistics that directly refer to the nation's seasonally adjusted unemployment rate. Below is a comparison of the seasonally adjusted unemployment rates by province/territory, sortable by name or unemployment rate. Data provided by Statistics Canada's Labour Force Survey. Not seasonally adjusted data reflects the actual current unemployment rate, while seasonally adjusted data removes the seasonal component from the information.

== Unemployment by province or territory ==
Province	Unemployment percentage of labour force as of April 2025	Monthly percent change (▼=drop in unemployment)
Alberta	7.8	0.0%
British Columbia	6.6	▲0.2%
Manitoba	5.8	▼0.4%
Newfoundland and Labrador	10.1	▼0.5%
New Brunswick	7.9	▼0.2%
Nova Scotia	6.7	▲0.5%
Ontario	7.6	▲0.3%
Prince Edward Island	8.5	▼1.2%
Quebec	5.3	▲0.4%
Saskatchewan	5.5	▼0.5%
Canada (national)	6.9	▲0.2%

Definitions of modern full employment range from 3% to 6% unemployment rates.

== Data differences from US rates ==
Canada uses a different measure to gauge the unemployment than the United States calculation. An analyst with the American Bureau of Labour Statistics stated that if the Canadian unemployment rate were adjusted to U.S. concepts, it would be reduced by 1 percentage point.

== Unemployment extremes ==
The lowest level of national unemployment came in 1947 with a 2.2% unemployment rate, a result of the smaller pool of available workers caused by casualties from the Second World War.

The highest level of unemployment throughout Canada was set in December 1982, when the early 1980s recession resulted in 13.1% of the adult population being out of work due to economic factors that originated in the United States. The primary cause of the early 1980s recession was a contractionary monetary policy established by the Federal Reserve System to control high inflation.

During the Great Depression, urban unemployment throughout Canada was 19%; Toronto's rate was 17%, according to the census of 1931. Farmers who stayed on their farms were not considered unemployed.

According to data from Statistics Canada, youth unemployment hit 14.6% in July 2025, the highest it had been since 2010 (outside of the COVID-19 pandemic).
