= 2025 in climate change =

This article documents notable events, research findings, scientific and technological advances, and human actions to measure, predict, mitigate, and adapt to the effects of global warming and climate change—during the year 2025.

== Summaries ==
The cusp of a new era

We are on the cusp of a new era. Fossil fuels are running out of road. The sun is rising on a clean energy age.

— UN Secretary General António Guterres, 22 July 2025
This will never, ever be forgiven

To squabble while famines take hold, forcing millions to flee their homelands – this will never be forgotten as conflicts spread. ... When climate disasters decimate the lives of millions, when we already have the solutions, this will never, ever be forgiven

— Simon Stiell, executive secretary of the UNFCCC,
at COP30 in Brazil, November 2025
- May: André Corrêa do Lago, director of the 2025 United Nations Climate Change Conference (COP30, in Brazil), said, "It is not possible to have [scientific] denialism at this stage, after everything that has happened in recent years. So there is a migration from scientific denial to a denial that economic measures against climate change can be good for the economy and for people."
- 20 May: a study published in BioScience said that climate change has joined overexploitation and habitat alteration, to become a third major threat to Earth's animals.
- June: the Energy Institute's Statistical Review of World Energy suggested that 2025 may be the beginning of a paradigm shift in which the energy transition is driven by pursuit of energy security through energy independence ("risk hedging" in a volatile and uncertain environment, and seeking "resilient, decentralized, and clean energy systems"), rather pursuing climate change mitigation per se.

== Measurements and statistics ==
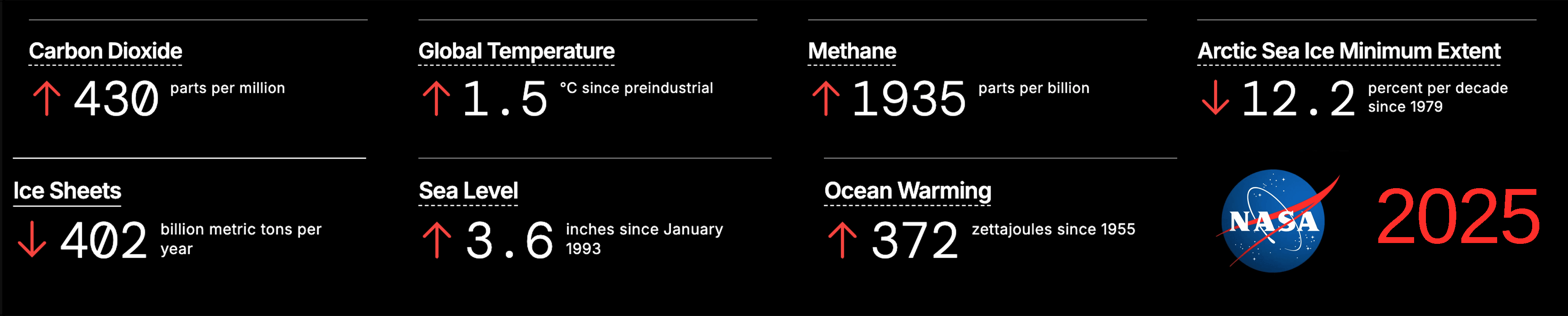
"Vital Signs of the Planet" as presented by NASA on 31 December 2025

Global average surface temperatures, shown here for each January, reached a record high temperature of 1.75 °C above its pre-industrial reference period during January 2025 despite the Earth being in a La Niña (regional cooling) phase.

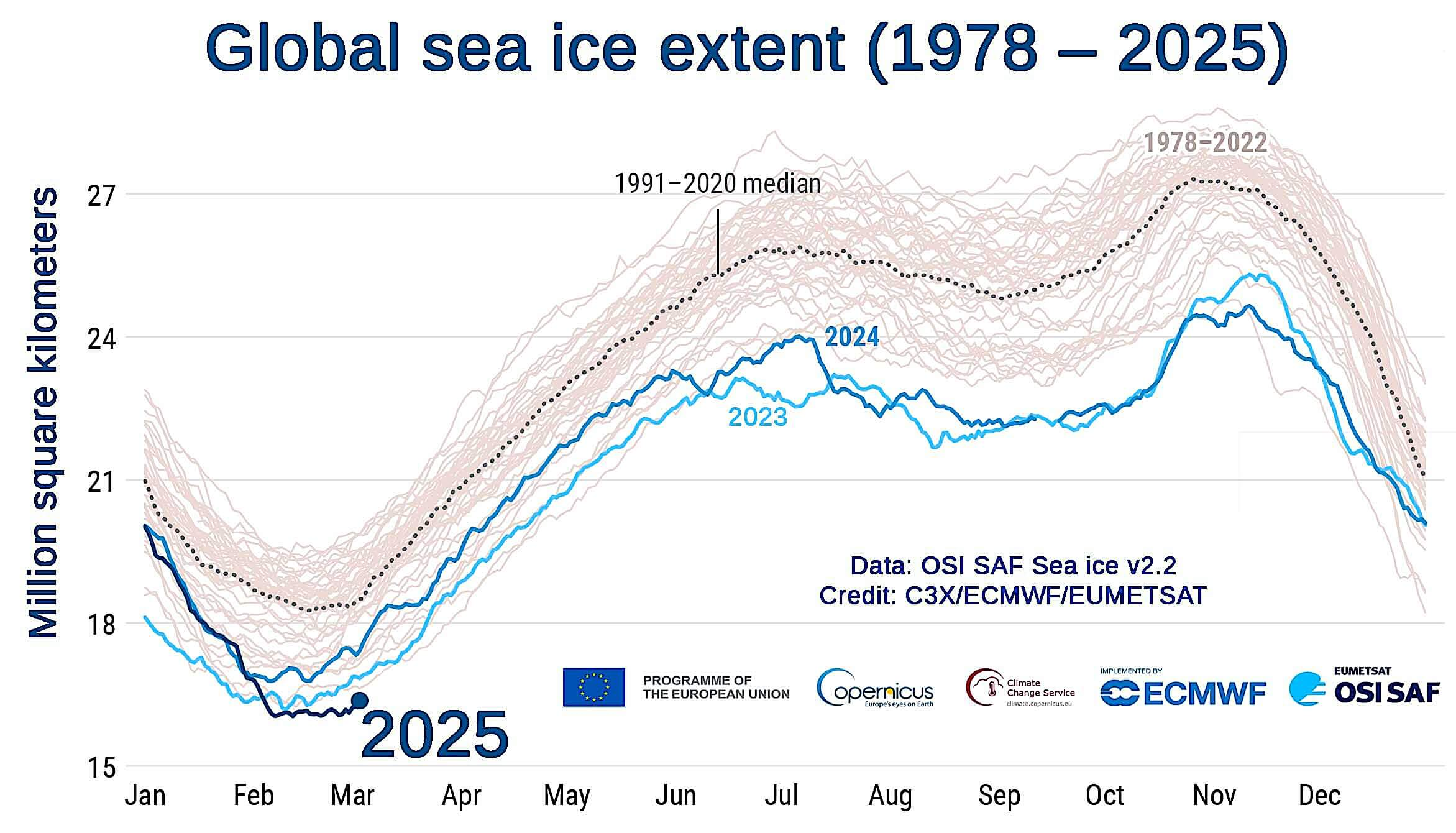
Global sea ice reached a new all-time minimum in early February, and remained below the previous record of February 2023 for the rest of the month.

Hansen et al. (2025) wrote that the IPCC had underestimated aerosols' cooling effect, causing it to also underestimate climate sensitivity (Earth's responsiveness to increases in greenhouse gas concentrations). In what Hansen called a Faustian bargain, regulation of aerosols improved air quality, but aerosols' cooling effect became inadequate to temper the increasing warming effect of greenhouse gases—explaining unexpectedly large global warming in 2023-2024.

Scientists in the field of extreme event attribution have concluded that in virtually all countries and territories around the world in a one-year period beginning in May 2024, human-caused global warming has increased the number of days of extreme heat events over long-term norms.

In 2025, growth in solar, wind and other low-carbon electric power exceeded the overall growth in demand for electricity, reducing reliance on fossil fuels and helping to curb greenhouse gas emissions.

15 December: an article published in the Copernicus Programme's Earth System Science Data presented a GloSAT global surface air temperature dataset based on marine air temperature observations rather than the sea surface temperature measurements typically used. GloSAT extended back to the 1780s, earlier than 1850 covered by previous datasets.

- 10 January: a summary from the Copernicus Climate Change Service stated that 2024 was the warmest year since records began in 1850, with an average global surface temperature reaching 1.6 °C above pre-industrial levels, surpassing for the first time the 1.5 °C warming target set by the Paris Agreement. The summary also stated that 2024 was the second consecutive year with the hottest global temperature, surpassing 2023 by +0.12 °C.
- 21 January: a study published in Nature Climate Change concluded that at least 30% of the Arctic has become a net source of carbon dioxide.
- 28 January: a study published in Environmental Research Letters reported that global mean sea surface temperature increases had more than quadrupled, from 0.06 K per decade during 1985–89 to 0.27 K per decade for 2019–23, and projected that the increase inferred over the past 40 years would likely be exceeded within the next 20 years.
- 3 February: a study co-authored by James Hansen published in Environment concluded that the IPCC had underestimated the effect of aerosols' planet-cooling radiative forcing, after enactment of international regulation of maritime aerosol emissions in the 2020s designed to improve air quality. This underestimation of aerosols' effect was said to cause underestimation of climate sensitivity, Hansen et al. writing that the reduction in aerosols explains the unexpectedly large global warming experienced in 2023-2024.
- 10 February: a study published in Nature Climate Change shows that the first single calendar year above 1.5 °C relative to pre-industrial levels in 2024 indicates that most probably Earth has already entered the 20-year period that will reach the Paris Agreement limit — that is, a 20-year period with average warming of 1.5 °C.
- 24 February: a study published by the non-profit Initiative on GHG Accounting of War estimated that the three years of the Russian invasion of Ukraine had caused 230 MtCO_{2}e (metric tons of carbon dioxide equivalent) emissions—citing warfare, buildings reconstruction, landscape fires, damage to energy infrastructure, refugee and civil aviation displacement.
- 7 March: a study by World Weather Attribution concluded that in a February 2025 heat wave, climate change made extreme heat at least 2 °C hotter and at least ten times more likely.
- 21 March: on the first World Glaciers Day (established by the UN General Assembly), the World Meteorological Organization reported that five of the past six years witnessed the most rapid glacier retreat on record, and 2022-2024 witnessed the largest three-year loss of glacier mass on record.
- 14 April: a study published in the Proceedings of the National Academy of Sciences concluded that since 1940, global warming has tripled the number of days per year that the oceans experience extreme surface heat conditions, and is responsible for a 1 °C increase in maximum intensity of marine heatwave events.
- 10 May: a study published in AGU Advances said that observations from space show that Earth's energy imbalance in 2023 reached values that were twice that of the best estimate from the IPCC, and cautioned that the ability to observe this imbalance is deteriorating because satellites are being decommissioned.
- 30 May: a study jointly published by Climate Central, the Red Cross Red Crescent Climate Centre, and World Weather Attribution concluded that in the preceding year, four billion people experienced at least thirty additional days of extreme heat because of climate change; and that in 195 countries and territories, climate change at least doubled the number of extreme heat days as compared to a world without climate change.
- 5 June (reported): for the first time, NOAA's Mauna Loa Observatory measured an atmospheric carbon dioxide concentration of over 430 parts per million.
- 16 June: a study published in Nature Communications found that higher temperatures (27.3 °C vs. 6.4 °C) were associated with a 45% higher probability of having obstructive sleep apnea on a given night.
- 18 June: a study published in Nature concluded that global warming reduces crop production by 4.4% of recommended caloric consumption for each 1 °C of global warming, though adaptation measures can reduce losses.
- July: the International Renewable Energy Agency's Renewable Power Generation Costs 2024 said that on a levelized cost of electricity (LCOE) basis, 91% of new renewable utility-scale capacity delivered power at a lower cost than the cheapest new fossil fuel-based alternative. New onshore wind projects had an LCOE of $0.034/kWh, solar photovoltaic $0.043/kWh, and hydropower $0.057/kWh.
- 7 July: a study published in Nature Geoscience reported that changes in long-duration heatwaves increase nonlinearly with temperature, with increments of warming increasing the durations more than proportionately.
- 11 August: applying extreme event attribution, a study published in Nature Ecology & Evolution concluded that human-caused intensification of heat extremes caused a 25–38% reduction in global abundance of tropical birds from 1950 to 2020.
- 25 August: an article published in Nature Climate Change reported the results of a 15-year study that concluded that long-term exposure to heat waves accelerated the aging process, with manual workers, rural residents and participants from communities with fewer air conditioners being more susceptible to health impacts.
- 27 August: a study published in Nature Climate Change concluded that tropical deforestation-induced local warming is associated with 23,610–33,560 heat-related deaths per year.
- 3 September: noting that the planet's carbon sequestration capacity is not unlimited, a study published in Nature concluded that fully using Earth's geologic storage capacity would help limit global warming by only 0.7 °C (1.3 °F).
- 10 September: applying extreme event attribution to 213 historical heatwaves from 2000–2023, a study published in Nature concluded that human-caused climate change made the median of heatwaves in 2000–2009 about 20 times more likely than a pre-industrial baseline, and heatwaves in 2010–2019 about 200 times more likely. Specifically, the study concluded that fossil fuel and cement producers enabled 16–53 heatwaves that would have been virtually impossible in a preindustrial climate.
- 10 September: a study published in Nature attributed 3,400–7,400 acute deaths in North America and 37,800–90,900 chronic deaths in North America and Europe to PM_{2.5} (fine particulate matter) exposure from the 2023 Canadian wildfires.
- 7 October: Ember's Global Electricity Mid-Year Insights 2025 reported that in the first half of 2025, renewables overtook coal generation for the first time on record (34.3% vs. 33.1% of global electricity).
- 13 October: Global Tipping Points Report 2025 said that "warm-water coral reefs are crossing their thermal tipping point and experiencing unprecedented dieback".
Heat-related mortality

Indicator 1.1.5: In 2012–21, global heat-related mortality reached an estimated average 546,000 deaths annually, a 63.2% increase compared with the 335,000 annual deaths in 1990–99.

— The Lancet, 13 December 2025,
2025 Countdown on health and climate change
- 13 October: a global study of ~320,000 sleep-tracker users, published in the journal Sleep, found that high ambient temperatures (99th vs 50th percentile: 27.3 °C vs 12.2 °C) were associated with a mean sleep loss of approximately 15–17 minutes and a ~40 % increase in the probability of a short-sleep night.
- 16 October: the World Meteorological Organization's Greenhouse Gas Bulletin reported that from 2023 to 2024, atmospheric carbon dioxide increased by 3.5 ppm, constituting the largest single-year increase since measurements began in 1957.
- 28 October: The Lancet estimated that in 2022, 2.52 million deaths globally were attributable to ambient air pollution from burning fossil fuels.
- 12 November: a report from Amnesty International said that at least 2 billion people, including 520 million children, live within 5 kilometres (3.1 mi) of fossil fuel infrastructure.
- 12 November: a report from the American Association for the Advancement of Science (AAAS) said that the remaining carbon budget to limit global warming to 1.5 °C is "virtually exhausted"—equivalent to four years at 2025 emissions levels.
- May: an EIT Urban Mobility study of non-exhaust emissions published by the European Institute of Innovation and Technology said that because of regenerative braking, electric vehicles produce ~83% less brake dust than equivalent conventional vehicles, though their increased weight leads to 20% higher tire and road wear emissions.
- 9 December: a report from the Global Coral Reef Monitoring Network concluded that, from 1980 to 2024, Caribbean hard coral cover declined by 48%; and that, between 1985 and 2024, mean sea surface temperature over coral reef areas increased by +1.07 °C.
- 9 January 2026: a report published in Advances in Atmospheric Sciences said that ocean heat content in 2025 had reached a new record for nine consecutive years.
- 22 January 2026: Ember's European Electricity Review 2026 reported that in 2025, wind and solar energy provided 30% of EU electricity, surpassing fossil power (29%) for the first time, and generating more power than fossil sources in 14 of 27 EU countries.
- 21 April 2026: Ember's Global Electricity Review 2026 said that, in 2025, clean power growth exceeded the rise in overall global electricity demand (fossil fuel generation declining), and that renewables overtook coal power.
- 28 July 2026: risk assessor First Street's Global Severe Convective Storm Risk Pricing Economic Exposure to a Rising Peril stated that cumulative insured losses from severe convective storms (SCS)—hail, damaging straight-line winds, tornadoes, and severe thunderstorms—overtook that of tropical cyclones, with $82 billion in economic losses and constituting nearly one-third of all natural catastrophe losses worldwide in 2025.

== Natural events and phenomena ==
- 1 January: a study published in Science Advances concluded that faster flow of the Antarctic Circumpolar Current (ACC) at higher latitudes causes upwelling of isotopically light deep waters around Antarctica, likely increasing atmospheric carbon dioxide levels and thereby potentially constituting a critical positive feedback for future warming.
- 6 January: a study published in Nature Climate Change stated that a fungal pathogen (Entomophaga maimaiga) that had successfully controlled the defoliation of the spongy moth in North American forests was becoming less effective due to climate change producing hotter, drier conditions. The study predicts this will lead to significantly decreased forest biodiversity and productivity by spongy moths, evidenced by recent increases in defoliation.
- 7 January: NOAA's Arctic Report Card 2024 reported that, including the impact of increased wildfires, the Arctic tundra region had shifted from storing carbon in the soil to becoming a carbon dioxide source, and that the Arctic remained a consistent source of methane—both adding to planet-warming greenhouse gases in the air.
- 8 January: a study published in Nature concluded that one-quarter of 23,496 decapod crustaceans, fishes and odonates studied, some of which provide climate change mitigation, are threatened with extinction. One-fifth of threatened freshwater species are affected by climate change and severe weather events.
- 9 January: a study published in Nature Reviews Earth & Environment estimated that since the mid-twentieth century, global-averaged 3-month and 12-month "hydroclimate whiplash" events have increased by 31–66% and 8–31%, respectively. Such increases amplify hazards associated with rapid swings between wet and dry states, including flash floods, wildfires, landslides and disease outbreaks. (Hydroclimate volatility refers to "sudden, large and/or frequent transitions between very dry and very wet conditions".)
- 15 January: a study published in Weather reported that the terrestrial biosphere's rate of natural carbon dioxide sequestration has fallen since its 2008 peak at a rate of 0.25% per year, a decline that will accelerate climate change.
- 16 January: an interdisciplinary and transdisciplinary study published in Communications Earth & Environment identified five key hazards of permafrost thaw: infrastructure failure, disruption of mobility and supplies, decreased water quality, challenges for food security, and exposure to diseases and contaminants.
- 21 January: a study published in the Proceedings of the National Academy of Sciences reported an "abrupt, coherent, climate-driven transformation" from "blue" (more transparent) to "brown" (less transparent) states of lakes in Greenland after a season of both record heat and rainfall drove a state change in these systems. This change was said to alter "numerous physical, chemical, and biological lake features", and the state changes were said to be unprecedented.
- February: though polar bears and grizzly bears traditionally occupy distinct habitats (marine and land), arctic warming has forced polar bears inland into grizzly bear habitats, where the two species mate to produce hybrid "grolar bears" that have characteristics poorly adapted to either marine or land habitats.
- 4 February: a study published in Environmental Research Letters concluded that, in addition to the 2023 marine heat wave, an extensive river plume caused a ~10–20 m (33–66 ft) thick strongly stratified barrier layer that contributed to Hurricane Idalia's rapid intensification (Category 1 to Category 4 in less than 24 hours).
- 21 February: a study published in npj Natural Hazards unified studies of climatic trends and of wildland–urban interface (WUI) expansion, and concluded that climatic factors increased the frequency of high-risk fire weather by a factor of 2.5, and that the combination of climatic factors with WUI expansion led to a 4.1-fold increase in the frequency of conditions conducive to extreme-impact wildfires from 1990 to 2022 across California.
- 26 February: a study published in Nature concluded that the Atlantic meridional overturning circulation (AMOC) is resilient to extreme greenhouse gas and North Atlantic freshwater forcings across 34 climate models, suggesting that an AMOC collapse is unlikely in the 21st century.
- 26 February: a study published in Science Advances concluded that short-, mid-, and long-term ambient outdoor heat can significantly accelerate epigenetic aging in older adults.
- 5 March: a study published in Geophysical Research Letters concluded that redistribution of mass caused by melting of ice sheets and glaciers will shift the Earth's rotational poles from 12–27 metres (39–89 ft) by 2100, depending on the degree of future global warming. Changing Earth's rotational axis affects spacecraft navigation and orientation of deep space telescopes.
- 10 March: a study published in Nature Sustainability projected that climate change's cooling of the atmosphere occupied by space debris in low Earth orbit will reduce the atmosphere's drag on the debris, extending the debris' lifetime and potentially causing a 50–66% reduction in satellite carrying capacity at altitudes 200–1,000 km (120–620 mi).
- 19 March: an article published in Nature said that two major natural events occurred at the end of the last ice age: around 10,300 and 8,300 years ago, sea levels surged rapidly due to meltwater releases from the North American and Antarctic ice sheets, with peak rates of sea-level rise reaching nearly 9 mm/year — comparable to projections for the year 2100 under high-emissions scenarios.
- 25 March: an article published in Nature said that volcanic eruptions over the past 603 years have significantly impacted the strength and tilt of the Atlantic jet stream, which in turn influenced extreme weather events in Europe. These jet stream shifts contributed to increased droughts when moving north and heightened flood risks when shifting south.
- 10 April: NOAA published a statement that after a few months of La Niña conditions, the tropical Pacific was ENSO-neutral and was likely to remain so through autumn, stating the most recent La Niña phase was very brief.
- 21 April: NOAA confirmed the Earth was experiencing its fourth global coral bleaching event, which it called the biggest to date: from 1 January 2023 to 20 April 2025, bleaching-level heat stress had impacted 83.7% of the world's coral reef area, and mass coral bleaching had been documented in at least 83 countries and territories.
- 30 April: a study published in Nature Communications described how melting of sea ice caused by global warming allows increased areas of open water—which passes a narrower spectrum of light than the smooth continuum of frequencies passed by sea ice—to "cause major changes in both the pigment and species composition of primary producers in polar ecosystems". These changes affect photosynthesis in ocean phytoplankton.
- 31 March: a study published in the American Geophysical Union's JGR Oceans said that most climate model simulations project a decline or disappearance of the Beaufort Gyre before 2100, so that the gyre region would no longer accumulate freshwater, thus impacting oceanic properties in the Arctic and North Atlantic..
- 6 May: a study published in Nature Communications concluded that glacial melt is accelerated even when ocean temperatures are constant, a phenomenon caused when cold fresh meltwater rushing from beneath glaciers creates upward turbulence, drawing in warm ocean water from below.
- 8 May: NOAA's April 2025 U.S. Climate Report documented a slow-moving storm system that brought over 150 tornadoes to the South and Midwest, resulting in at least 24 fatalities and widespread flooding. This event underscores the increasing frequency of severe convective storms in a warming climate.
- 20 May: a study published in Communications Earth & Environment concluded that merely maintaining a global average temperature of +1.5 °C is inadequate to avoid extensive loss and damage to coastal populations in coming centuries, and hypothesized that "+1 °C above pre-industrial, possibly even lower" is required to avoid such loss and damage.
- 31 May: a study published in Communications Earth & Environment suggested that as glacial melt exposes soil, glacial meltwater's net sequestration of carbon dioxide gives way to water from exposed soil that enhances methane and carbon dioxide production, switching from a negative to positive warming feedback.
- 9 June: a study published in Global Change Biology suggested that by 2020, global ocean acidity conditions had already crossed into the uncertainty range of the Planetary Boundary Framework.
- 16 June: a study published in the Proceedings of the National Academy of Sciences reported a tripling in the past half-century of the number of planetary wave events caused by quasi-resonant amplification (QRA). Such wave events underlie extreme weather events such as heatwaves, flooding, wildfires, and heat dome events.
- 7 July: findings in a study published in Proceedings of the National Academy of Sciences suggested that current Earth system models overestimate the ability of northern temperate forests to absorb carbon, because the models do not consider the impacts of shrinking snowpack and increased soil freeze/thaw cycles.
- 14 July: a study published in Communications Earth & Environment said that accelerated East Asian reduction in aerosol emissions unmasks greenhouse gas-driven warming, enough to be a main driver of the accelerated global warming since 2010.
- 5 August: a study published in Geophysical Research Letters concluded that a slowdown in the rate of Arctic sea ice decline since 2005 is largely due to natural climate variation. The study forecast that the slowdown could continue for another five to ten years, although a faster-than-average sea ice decline would be more likely thereafter.
- 10 August (occurrence of megatsunami): a study published in Science concluded that climate change had "preconditioned" a >64 million cubic meter landslide in Alaska's Tracy Arm fjord that caused a 481-meter run-up megatsunami after an initial 100-meter high breaking wave traveling at over 70 metres per second (160 mph).
- 2 September: a study published in the Proceedings of the National Academy of Sciences reported that the Gulf of Panama's seasonal upwelling failed in early 2025, breaking a >40-year record of reliability, which the researchers said "underscores how climate disruption can threaten wind-driven tropical upwelling systems".
- 10 September: a study published in Aerospace assessed how a warming atmosphere could reduce aircraft climb angles by 2035–2064 and concluded that the number of people affected by aircraft-generated noise pollution could increase by up to 4%, and that the effects are maximised for the most damaging and psychologically annoying (low) frequencies.
- 18 September: the World Meteorological Organization's State of Global Water Resources Report 2024 concluded that only one third of river basins had normal hydrological conditions in 2024, and that all glacier regions lost ice for third straight year.
- 24 September: a report from the Potsdam Institute for Climate Impact Research assessed that the Ocean Acidification Boundary had been breached for the first time, with ocean acidity entering its danger zone—the seventh of nine critical Earth system boundaries to have been exceeded.
- 15 October: a study published in Nature concluded that Australian rainforests had transitioned from carbon sink (on balance, removing carbon dioxide from the atmosphere) to carbon source (on balance, adding carbon dioxide to the atmosphere).
- 15 October: a study published in Nature concluded that global sea-level rise rates since 1900 are faster than in any century over at least the past four millennia, with human activities causing over 94% of observed urban subsidence in southeastern China.
- 28 November: a study published in Scientific Reports reported that between 2010 and 2017, Africa’s forests and woody savannas transitioned from being a carbon sink to a carbon source, a transition largely attributed to deforestation.
- 8 December: a study published in the Journal of Child Psychology and Psychiatry concluded that children exposed to average maximum temperatures above 32 °C (90 °F) were less likely to be developmentally on track compared to those exposed to cooler temperatures, with literacy and numeracy skills being most affected.
- 16 April 2026 (reported): an editorial published in Nature noted that, in 2025, mosquitos were found in Iceland for the first time, and were said to be "a warning that the Arctic lacks a system for monitoring arthropods and anticipating biological risks before they escalate".

== Actions, and goal statements ==
=== Science and technology ===
A positive tipping point

Experts believe that solar, wind, and EVs have irreversibly crossed a positive tipping point and entered a virtuous cycle of cost decline and widespread adoption.

— Climate Action Team in the Executive Office
of the United Nations Secretary-General
July 2025
- 12 February: a study published in Bird Study found that solar farms can benefit bird abundance and biodiversity in arable-dominated landscapes, especially when managed with biodiversity in mind.
- 3 March: advising policy makers to assimilate uncertainty into decision making to increase decarbonization, a study published in the Proceedings of the National Academy of Sciences urged a "portfolio approach" of planting diverse species of trees, as that approach "reduces exposure to downside cost extremes".
- 23 April: a study published in Nature applied extreme event attribution to conclude that Chevron Corporation very likely caused between US $791 billion and $3.6 trillion in heat-related losses from 1991 through 2020.
- May (reported): a technique involves pumping water from beneath Arctic ice and spraying it on top of the ice. It quickly refreezes, thickening the ice in that location so that it lasts longer into the warm months and increases the amount of planet-warming sunlight that is reflected back into space.
- Spring: two Chinese companies announced battery technology to enable electric vehicles to drive hundreds of miles on a five-minute charge. BYD Company developed a battery with a peak charging capacity of 1,000 kilowatts, compared to U.S. chargers with peak rates of 400 kilowatts or less.
- 15 December: the Copernicus Programme's Earth System Science Data released the GloSAT reference analysis, a gridded data set of air temperature change across global land and ocean extending back to the 1780s, using marine air temperature observations rather than the sea surface temperature measurements.

=== Political, economic, legal, and cultural actions ===
Existential problem of planetary proportions

(Climate change is) an existential problem of planetary proportions that imperils all forms of life and the very health of our planet. ... A complete solution to this daunting, and self-inflicted, problem requires the contribution of all fields of human knowledge, whether law, science, economics or any other.

— International Court of Justice advisory opinion regarding Obligations of States in respect of climate change
26 July 2025
- 20 January: within hours of his inauguration, U.S. President Donald Trump signed an executive order to withdraw the country from the 2015 Paris Agreement, joining Iran, Libya and Yemen as the only countries not party to the agreement.
- 4 March: the administration of U.S. President Donald Trump withdrew the country's representatives from the board of the United Nations' Loss and Damage Fund, which was formed to help poor and vulnerable nations cope with climate change-fueled disasters.
- 13 March: the Costa Rica-based Inter-American Court of Human Rights ordered the Ecuadorian government to protect Indigenous people from oil operations, to leave oil in the ground underneath their lands, and to ensure future oil operations do not impact Indigenous peoples living in voluntary isolation.
- 14 March: 440 Olympic athletes from 90 countries and 50 sports published an open letter to candidates for President of the International Olympic Committee, urging them to keep "the spirit of the Games alive by ensuring that sport remains accessible and safe for future generations".
- 24 March: the Supreme Court of the United States declined to hear the appeal in Juliana v. United States, ending the case in which youth plaintiffs asserted in their 2015 filing that the government had violated their constitutional rights by encouraging use of fossil fuels. Certain other lawsuits with similar strategies were more successful.

In May 2025, NOAA/NCEI in the Trump administration indicated that it would no longer assemble the data that forms the basis of this chart. NOAA/NCEI has access to non-public data, so that any private databases would be more limited in scope.

- 30 March: an open letter signed by 1900 researchers called on the administration of US President Donald Trump to stop its "wholesale assault on U.S. science", including its blocking of research on climate change, and causing researchers to live in a "climate of fear" amid the administration's flagging of terms such as climate change as objectionable.
- 28 April: U.S. President Donald Trump dismissed the scientists and experts who compile the National Climate Assessments (NCAs) that are required by the U.S. Congress, the next assessment having been planned for 2028. This decision disrupted the NCA's long-standing process of providing Congress and the public with credible, science-based climate information. Within the week, the American Meteorological Society (AMS) and the American Geophysical Union (AGU) said that together they will produce over 29 peer-reviewed journals to cover climate change; that while not claiming they will replace the NCA, they will carry on its work.
- 7 May: a study of emissions inequality from 1990 to 2020 published in Nature Climate Change concluded that two-thirds of global warming is attributable to the wealthiest 10%, and 20% of warming is attributable to the wealthiest 1%. Numerous other statistics were presented.
- 8 May (reported): the National Oceanic and Atmospheric Administration (NOAA) under U.S. President Donald Trump said that NOAA's National Centers for Environmental Information would no longer update its Billion-Dollar Weather and Climate Disasters database beyond 2024, and that its information—going as far back as 1980—would be archived.
Beyond scientific dispute

In summary, the committee concludes that the evidence for current and future harm to human health and welfare created by human-caused GHGs is beyond scientific dispute. Much of the understanding of climate change that was uncertain or tentative in 2009 is now resolved and new threats have been identified. ... The United States faces a future in which climate-induced harm continues to worsen and today's extremes become tomorrow's norms.

— National Academies of
Sciences, Engineering, and Medicine
17 September 2025
A con job and a scam

[Climate change] is the greatest con job ever perpetrated on the world, in my opinion. ... All of these predictions...were made by stupid people that have cost their countries fortunes and given those same countries, no chance for success. If you don't get away from this green scam, your country is going to fail.

— US President Donald Trump
to the UN General Assembly,
23 September 2025
- 30 June: the globalchange.gov website of the U.S. Global Change Research Program, established in 1990 to host legislatively mandated reports including the National Climate Assessments, was taken down by the Trump administration.
- July (widely announced): the south Pacific island of Tuvalu, with an average elevation 2 metres (6.6 ft) above sea level, embarks on a plan to evacuate its entire population due to sea level rise, which is projected to inundate most of the territory at high tide by 2050. Australia formed a migration system allownig 280 Tuvaluans per year to settle in Australia as permanent residents.
- 29 July: the chief administrator of the US Environmental Protection Agency announced that the Trump administration would rescind the 2009 endangerment finding, which concluded that planet-warming greenhouse gases pose a threat to public health. (The endangerment finding is the scientific determination that underpins the U.S. government's legal authority to combat climate change.) A 13 August Carbon Brief fact-check concluded that there were at least 100 false or misleading statements in the Trump administration's A Critical Review of Impacts of Greenhouse Gas Emissions on the U.S. Climate that had been published on 23 July to support rescinding of the endangerment finding. On 30 August, Climate Experts' Review of the DOE Climate Working Group Report was published as a compendium of comments from 85 climate experts to counter the government's Critical review. The government's five-member Climate Working Group that authored the Critical Review was dissolved by 5 September in response to a lawsuit filed by the Environmental Defense Fund and Union of Concerned Scientists. On 17 September, the National Academies of Sciences, Engineering, and Medicine (NASEM) published a 137-page paper stating that "the evidence for current and future harm to human health and welfare created by human-caused GHGs is beyond scientific dispute." On 30 January 2026, a federal judge ruled that the Trump administration's Department of Energy violated the law with its 2005 "Climate Working Group" that generated the Critical Review. The EPA formally rescinded the Endangerment Finding on 12 February 2026.
- 22 September: Climate Action Tracker downgraded the US's rating from "insufficient" to "critically insufficient", citing US climate action under the Trump Administration.
- 28 October: Bill Gates wrote that "we’ve made great progress" fighting climate change, but that funds should not be cut for "health and development" for promoting human resilience. He wrote that people "will be able to live and thrive in most places on Earth for the foreseeable future", and that much of the climate community now "focus(es) too much on near-term emissions goals".
- November (reported): the University of California, San Diego is thought to be the first major public university in the U.S. to require undergraduate students to take a class on climate change to earn their degree, with other schools adding environmental sustainability requirements.
- November: the 2025 United Nations Climate Change Conference (COP30) took place in Belém, Brazil, without the United States sending high-level representatives. Administrators granted access to about 1600 fossil fuel lobbyists, constituting one in 25 attendees and outnumbering representatives from any individual country except Brazil. Negotiations came close to collapse and petrostates blocked measures for transition away from fossil fuels, though there was agreement of a just transition mechanism (JTM).
- 1 December (reported): US real estate listing service Zillow removed a feature, added in September, that listed individual properties' risk of wildfire, flood, extreme heat, wind and poor air quality. Removal was prompted by what The Guardian described as "complaints from real estate agents and some homeowners that the rankings appeared arbitrary, could not be challenged and harmed house sales".
- 10 December (reported): the US Environmental Protection Agency (EPA) removed mention of fossil fuels from its web page explaining the causes of climate change, retaining mention of only natural phenomena as causes.
- 13 May 2026: the United Nations General Assembly stated that it "welcomes the unanimous advisory opinion of the International Court of Justice of 23 July 2025 on the obligations of States in respect of climate change". (See quote box above.)

=== Mitigation goal statements ===
- March: the OECD's Investing in Climate for Growth and Development concluded that accelerated climate action provides economic gains, specifically, that under an Enhanced NDCs scenario, global GDP in 2040 would be 0.2% higher than under the Current Policies Scenario.
- October: UN Secretary General António Guterres said that based on nationally determined contribution (NDCs)s received so far, there is a predicted 10% reduction of emissions. He said that this reduction does not meet the 60% reduction needed to stay within the 1.5 °C of the Paris Agreement, so that overshooting the 1.5 °C threshold "is now inevitable".
- 9 December: the European Union Parliament announced a provisional political agreement of a 90% reduction target for greenhouse gas emissions by 2040 compared with 1990 levels, to achieve net-zero emissions in the EU by 2050.

=== Adaptation goal statements ===
- 9 March: US Secretary of Defense Peter Hegseth posted on social media website X that "The (US Department of Defense) does not do climate change crap", though a 2018 Pentagon study found that nearly half of all U.S. military sites were threatened by weather linked to climate change. Hegseth also called for a review of mission statements and military planning documents to ensure there are no "references to climate change and related subjects", though not prohibiting the Pentagon from "assessing weather-related impacts on operations, mitigating weather-related risks (or) conducting environmental assessments". The Defense Department had announced cancellation of 91 studies, including research on climate change impacts and global migration patterns, to save about 0.03% of the department's budget in 2024.

== Consensus ==
Surveys of US adults re global warming show slowly growing agreements that global warming is occurring and is mostly human-caused. By 2025, over 70% of surveyed US adults agreed that global warming is happening, and almost 60% agree that it is mostly human-caused.

- 17 April: a study published in Nature Human Behaviour found that presenting people with binary climate data—for example, a lake freezing versus not freezing—significantly increases the perceived impact of climate change compared to when continuous data such as temperature change is presented. The researchers said the findings confirmed the boiling frog effect for climate change communication.
- 5 June: results of a 20-country survey published in Nature Human Behaviour show strong majority support—including 75% of Europeans and half of Americans—for the Global Climate Scheme (a variant of Cap and Share) a global carbon price and cash redistribution plan. The study also found widespread support for increased foreign aid or a wealth tax to fund low-income countries.
- 22 August: results of a public survey of the global south published in Nature Climate Change found that scientists are perceived as the most trusted information source in all countries surveyed except Vietnam, and that trust in scientists correlates with increased climate knowledge.

== Projections ==
- 6 January: A study published in Scientific Reports comparing projected heat-related deaths from climate change with COVID-19 mortality rates across 38 global cities found that in half, annual heat-related deaths would likely exceed COVID-19 death rates within 10 years if global temperatures rise by 3.0 °C above pre-industrial levels. The study projected that cities in North America and Europe, particularly in Mediterranean and Central European regions, would have most dramatic increases in projected heat mortality.
- 3 February: climate risk financial modeling company First Street Foundation projected that by 2055, 70,026 U.S. neighborhoods (84% of all census tracts) may experience $1.47 trillion in net climate-related property value losses, citing insurance pressures and shifting consumer demand.
- 4 February: a review article published in Nature Reviews Earth & Environment, linking physical climate science with heat mortality risk, projected that human-caused global warming reaching 2 °C above preindustrial levels will cause tripling of global land area that is "uncompensable" (beyond which human core body temperature rises uncontrollably) for young adults.
- 26 February: a study published in Nature concluded that the Atlantic meridional overturning circulation (AMOC) is resilient to extreme greenhouse gas and North Atlantic freshwater forcings across 34 climate models, suggesting that an AMOC collapse is unlikely in the 21st century.
- 28 February: based on the Earth's orbital characteristics (precession, obliquity, and eccentricity), a study published in Science concluded that glacial-interglacial periodicity has been largely deterministic in a ~100,000 year cycle, and projected that in the absence of human-caused forcing, the next ice age would start in ~10,000 years.
- 5 March: a paper published in Nature cited the International Energy Agency as stating that data centers caused 1–1.3% of world electricity demand in 2022, but that, with electricity consumption expected to grow by more than 80% by 2050 owing to all sources, data centers were projected to "account for a relatively small share of overall electricity demand growth".
- 10 March: a study published in Nature Sustainability projected that climate change's cooling of the atmosphere that is occupied by space debris in low Earth orbit will reduce the atmosphere's drag on the debris, extending the debris' lifetime and potentially causing a 50–66% reduction in satellite carrying capacity at altitudes 200–1,000 km (120–620 mi).
- 12 March: the Boston Consulting Group's Landing the Economic Case for Climate Action with Decision Makers concluded that the net cost of failing to invest to reduce global warming from a current forecast 3.0 °C to 2.0 °C equates to 11% to 27% of cumulative economic output.
Overshooting 1.5 °C goal of Paris Agreement is inevitable

Science tells us it is still possible to keep temperature rise below 1.5 degrees Celsius by the end of the century. Yet, a temporary overshoot above 1.5 degrees, starting, at the latest, in the early 2030s, is now inevitable.

— UN Secretary General António Guterres
at COP30 in Brazil, November 2025
- 20 May: noting that current global temperatures have quadrupled the rate of ice sheet loss since the 1990s, a study published in Nature Communications concluded that maintaining current global temperatures will cause several metres of sea level rise over coming centuries, "causing extensive loss and damage to coastal populations and challenging the implementation of adaptation measures".
- 28 May: the World Meteorological Organization projected a 70% chance that the average global warming for 2025-2029 will be more than 1.5 °C, up from 47% in last year's report for 2024-2028.
- 29 May: a study published in Science estimated that if temperatures remain steady, glaciers globally will lose 39% of their 2020 mass, causing a sea level rise of 113 millimetres (4.4 in). More than twice as much glacier mass was projected to remain at the Paris Agreement's +1.5 °C goal than the 2.7 °C predicted from current policies (53% versus 24%).
- 16 June: a study published in Nature Communications projected that with ≥1.8 °C global warming, there would be a 1.2- to 3-fold increase in obstructive sleep apnea by 2100.
- 10 September: a report by Common Goal and Football for Future forecast that by 2050, 14 of 16 World Cup stadiums will face extreme heat conditions (unsafe without adaptation), and 11 stadiums will experience unplayable heat (where matches cannot be safely staged). Also, every grassroots pitch analyzed already breached at least three major climate risk thresholds, and two-thirds of grassroots pitches will face unsafe or unplayable heat conditions.
- 17 September: a study published in Nature projected that if global warming exceeds 2 °C (3.6 °F), at least 99% of western Atlantic coral reefs will be eroding by 2100.
- 18 September: referring to effects of PM_{2.5} (fine particulate matter), a study published in Nature projected 34,930-98,430 excess deaths per year in the US by 2050 under a high warming scenario, and suggested that "the health impacts of climate-driven wildfire smoke could be among the most important and costly consequences of a warming climate in the US".
- 23 September: a study published in Nature Communications projected that many regions may face high risk of "Day Zero Drought" (DZD) conditions by the 2020s and 2030s, with the length of time between successive DZD events being shorter DZD durations.
- 24 October: a study published in Nature Climate Change projected that under current climate policies, emissions until 2050 lock in 0.3 metres (0.98 ft) additional global mean sea level rise by 2300 than historical emissions until 2020, increasing to 0.8 metres (2.6 ft) for emissions until 2090.
- 17 November: a study published in Environmental Research: Climate examined heatwave changes after greenhouse gas emissions reach net zero, simulating assuming various years in which net zero is achieved. The research concluded that most regional trends show no decline over the entire 1000 years of each simulation, and projected that some regions will experience millennial-scale heating trends when net zero occurs on or after 2050.
- 18 November: a study published in Nature Communications Earth and Environment concluded that global warming will weaken Andes mountains glaciers' buffering role against megadroughts, estimating that Andes glacier runoff could decline by up to 20% (annual) and 48% (summer) during end-of-century megadroughts compared to pre-2010 levels.
- 19 November: a study published in Nature Communications reconstructed European summer durations over the last ten millennia and projected that by 2100, European summers could last up to 42 days longer under a business-as-usual scenario.
- 10 December: a study published in Nature concluded that, by 2100 under a high emissions scenario, a large part of the Amazon rainforest will shift to a hotter "hypertropical" climate in which "temperature and moisture conditions during typical dry season months will more frequently exceed identified drought mortality thresholds, elevating the risk of forest dieback".
- 17 December: the International Energy Agency forecast that global coal consumption has reached a plateau and may well decline by 2030.

== Significant publications ==
- Moon, Twila A.;Druckenmiller, Matthew L.;Thoman, Richard L., editors. Moon, Twila A.; Druckenmiller, Matthew L.; Thoman, Richard L. (2024). "Arctic Report Card 2024" (PDF). Noaa Technical Report Oar Arc ; 24-01 (Arctic Report Card). National Oceanic and Atmospheric Administration (NOAA) Office of Oceanic and Atmospheric Research. doi:10.25923/b7c7-6431. Archived (PDF) from the original on 11 March 2025.
- Elbeyi, Ece; Bruhn Jensen, Klaus; Aronczyk, Melissa; Asuka, Jusen; Ceylan, Gizem; Cook, John; Erdelyi, Gabor; Ford, Heather; Milani, Carlos; Mustafaraj, Eni; Ogenga, Fredrick; Yadin, Sharon; Howard, Philip N.; Valenzuela, Sebastián (June 2025). Brulle, Robert; Jacquet, Jennifer; Lewandowsky, Stephan; Roberts, Timmons (eds.). "Information Integrity about Climate Science: A Systematic Review" (PDF). Zurich, Switzerland: International Panel on the Information Environment (IPIE). doi:10.61452/BTZP3426. Archived (PDF) from the original on 19 June 2025.
- Guastello, Paula; Smith, Kelly Helm; Knutson, Cody; Svoboda, Mark (July 2025). "Drought Hotspots Around the World 2023-2025" (PDF). Prepared by the United States National Drought Mitigation Center for the United Nations Convention to Combat Desertification. Archived (PDF) from the original on 4 July 2025.
- "Obligations of States in Respect of Climate Change / Advisory Opinion" (PDF). International Court of Justice. 23 July 2025.
- Blunden, J.; Reagan, J.; Dunn, R. J. H. (August 2025). "State of the Climate in 2024" (PDF). Bulletin of the American Meteorological Society. 106 (8): S1–S513. Bibcode:2025BAMS..106Q...1B. doi:10.1175/2025BAMSStateoftheClimate.1.
- Kelley, Douglas I.; et al. (16 October 2025). "State of Wildfires 2024–2025". Earth System Science Data. 17 (10): 5377–5488. Bibcode:2025ESSD...17.5377K. doi:10.5194/essd-17-5377-2025. hdl:1871.1/09eac515-435f-42e3-b960-e39c3862725b.
- "Report on the Migratory Species and Climate Change Expert Workshop, Edinburgh, United Kingdom" (PDF). Edinburgh, UK: Convention on the Conservation of Migratory Species of Wild Animals (CMS). February 2025.
- State of the Global Climate 2024 (WMO-No. 1368). World Meteorological Organization (WMO). 2025. ISBN 978-92-63-11368-9.
- Ripple, William J.; Wolf, Christopher; Mann, Michael E.; Rockström, Johan; Gregg, Jillian W.; Xu, Chi; Wundrling, Nico; Perkins-Kirkpatrick, Sarah E.; Schaeffer, Roberto; Broadgate, Wendy J.; Newsome, Thomas M.; Schuckburth, Emily; Gleick, Peter H. (29 October 2025). "The 2025 state of the climate report: a planet on the brink". BioScience. 75 (12) biaf149. doi:10.1093/biosci/biaf149.
- Emissions Gap Report 2025 / Off target / Continued collective inaction puts global temperature goal at risk. United Nations Environment Programme (UNEP). November 2025. doi:10.59117/20.500.11822/48854. ISBN 978-92-807-4239-8.
- "No Escape II - The Way Forward - Bringing Climate Solutions to the Frontlines of Displacement and Conflict" (PDF). United Nations High Commissioner for Refugees (UNHCR). November 2025.
- "World Energy Outlook 2025" (PDF). International Energy Agency (IEA). November 2025. Archived (PDF) from the original on 19 November 2025.
- "State of the Climate / Update for COP30". World Meteorological Organization (WMO). November 2025. (permalink to download page)
- Romanello, Marina; et al. (28 October 2025). "The 2025 report of the Lancet Countdown on health and climate change" (PDF). The Lancet. 406 (10521): 2804–2857. doi:10.1016/S0140-6736(25)01919-1. PMID 41175887.
- Druckenmiller, Matthew L.; Thoman, Richart L.; Moon, Twila A. (December 2025). "Arctic Report Card 2025" (PDF). National Oceanic and Atmospheric Administration (NOAA). Archived (PDF) from the original on 20 December 2025.
- "State of the Global Climate 2025". World Meteorological Organization (WMO). March 2026.
- "European State of the Climate / Report 2025". World Meteorological Organization (WMO). April 2026.
- Romanello, Marina; et al. (13 December 2025). "The 2025 report of the Lancet Countdown on health and climate change: climate change action offers a lifeline" (PDF). The Lancet. 406 (10521): 2804–2857. doi:10.1016/S0140-6736(25)01919-1. PMID 41175887.

== See also ==
- 2025 in science
- 2025 in Antarctica
- Climatology § History
- History of climate change policy and politics
- History of climate change science
- Politics of climate change § History
- Timeline of sustainable energy research 2020–present
