= Sebastian Mernild =

Danish professor (born 1972)

Sebastian H. Mernild

Pro-Vice-Chancellor of the University of Southern Denmark
- In office October 2020 – 2022
- Chancellor: Henrik Dam
- Preceded by: Bjarne Graabech Sørensen
- Succeeded by: Helle Waagepetersen

Director (Program Chair) of Climate Centre of the University of Southern Denmark
- Incumbent
- Assumed office 2021

Director of the Nansen Environmental and Remote Sensing Center (NERSC)
- In office December 2016 – October 2020
- Succeeded by: Tore Furevik

Vice President of the International Commission on Snow and Ice Hydrology (under IAHS)
- In office 1 June 2015 – 31 May 2019

Personal details
- Born: 20 October 1972 (age 54) Frederiksberg, Denmark
- Spouse: Birgitte Therkildsen
- Children: 2
- Education: University of Copenhagen
- Awards: Rosenkjær Prize (2018)
- Website: https://mernild.com/

Military service
- Allegiance: Denmark
- Branch/service: Royal Danish Army
- Years of service: 1995–2010
- Rank: Captain (Artillery)
- Battles/wars: Kosovo & Afghan War
- Scientific career
- Fields: Climate Change, Glaciology, Hydrology, Climatology
- Workplaces: Geophysical Institute, University of Bergen, Western Norway University of Applied Sciences, New York University, Los Alamos National Laboratory, Hokkaido University, Center for Scientific Studies, Cooperative Institute for Research in Environmental Sciences, Cooperative Institute for Research in the Atmosphere, International Arctic Research Center

Jacob Sebastian Haugaard Mernild (born 20 October 1972) is a Danish professor in climate change, glaciology and hydrology at the University of Southern Denmark, serving as its pro-vice-chancellor from 2020 to 2022. Mernild has been an Intergovernmental Panel on Climate Change (IPCC) author for the United Nations since 2010. Initially a contributing author on the IPCC Fifth Assessment Report, he was lead author on the IPCC Sixth Assessment Report.

Mernild is one of the world's leading climate scientists in the fields of glaciology and hydrology, specializing in the impacts of climate change in the Arctic and on the cryosphere, especially the ice sheets (glacier mass balance) and water levels. He has contributed to a number of international scientific reports, including the annual Arctic Report Card from National Oceanic and Atmospheric Administration (NOAA) and the Melting Snow and Ice: A Call for Action report, which Vice President Al Gore presented at the United Nations Climate Change Conference in Copenhagen in 2015.

Mernild has worked as a senior research scientist at the Los Alamos National Laboratory and the International Arctic Research Center at the University of Alaska Fairbanks, United States, and as research director of the Climate Change and Glaciology Laboratory at the Center for Scientific Studies in Valdivia, Chile. He has on several occasions been a visiting professor at Colorado State University, University of Colorado Boulder, New York University, Hokkaido University, and Japan Agency for Marine-Earth Science and Technology.

In 2016, he became the managing director of the 'Nansen Center' (part of Bjerknes Centre for Climate Research) in Bergen, Norway, a renowned climate research centre in Europe. He was elected pro-vice-chancellor (Danish: Prorektor) of the University of Southern Denmark in 2020, and served until 2022.

== Early life and education ==
Jacob Sebastian Haugaard Mernild was born in 1972 in Frederiksberg, Copenhagen, Denmark. He grew up in Hjallese, a suburb of Odense. Mernild graduated from Sct. Knuds Gymnasium in 1993. He was admitted to the 'Teknikum' (College of Engineering), where he was to study engineering. Mernild soon dropped out, however, and instead became a captain in the Royal Danish Army, serving in Kosovo and the Afghan War.

After serving in the Danish army, Mernild completed a Bachelor of Science degree in high-latitude climatology and glaciology from the Department of Geology of the University of Copenhagen in 1999. In 2001, he completed a Master of Science degree in mid-latitude climatology and hydrology, also from the University of Copenhagen. Mernild obtained a PhD degree in high-latitude climatology, glaciology, and hydrology, in 2006. In June 2016, Mernild successfully defended his doctoral thesis, Water balance from mountain glacier scale to ice sheet scale with focus on Mittvakkat Glacier, Southeast Greenland and the Greenland Ice Sheet and thereby obtained a Doctor of Science degree from the Faculty of Science (University of Copenhagen).

== Career ==
In between his PhD degree and D.Sc. degree, he worked at the International Arctic Research Center of the University of Alaska Fairbanks, until 2009. He then worked as a scientific researcher at the COSIM (Climate, Ocean and Sea Ice Modeling) Project of the Office of Science § Biological and Environmental Research, within the United States Department of Energy and the Department of Computational Physics and Methods at the Los Alamos National Laboratory in New Mexico, US until 2013, followed by three years as the research director of the Climate Change and Glaciology Laboratory at the Center for Scientific Studies in Valdivia, Chile until 2016.

In 2004, and again between 2009 and 2010, he was a visiting professor at the Cooperative Institute for Research in the Atmosphere at Colorado State University, and from 2007 to 2008 (and again in 2015), he was a visiting professor at the Cooperative Institute for Research in Environmental Sciences at the University of Colorado Boulder. In 2008, he was a visiting professor at the Institute for Low Temperature Sciences at Hokkaido University, Japan. Between 2011 and 2012, he was a visiting professor at the Center for Atmospheric Ocean Science at New York University, whereafter he was a visiting professor at the Center for Sea Level Change at New York University Abu Dhabi, UAE.

In 2016, he became a full professor at the Faculty of Engineering and Science at the Western Norway University of Applied Sciences in Sogndal, but shortly afterwards he was appointed managing director of the Nansen Environmental and Remote Sensing Center (NERSC) in Bergen. He was elected pro-vice-chancellor (Danish: Prorektor) of the University of Southern Denmark in 2020. He is also the director (Program Chair) of the newly established Climate Centre of the University of Southern Denmark. Mernild is also partly a professor of climate change and glaciology at the Geophysical Institute of the University of Bergen in Norway.

=== Scientific research ===
Mernild's scientific research focuses on local, regional and global climate modelling, using various atmospheric and terrestrial models and observations, with a particular focus on understanding and simulating climate change interactions related to snow, glacier ice mass-balance (for the Greenland Ice Sheet, Antarctic Ice Sheet, and mountain glaciers), and freshwater run-off (the water balance components) in the Arctic, Antarctic, Patagonia, and the Andes.

Mernild has also conducted extensive field research in cold and high mountain regions, leading and participating in glaciological, snow, and hydrological research expeditions throughout the Arctic and Andes.

Mernild's scientific research and findings on glaciers and climate change impacts on them, in particular, have received considerable attention in climate science forums, and the general public. Mernild's studies of Greenlandic glaciers have received particular attention because they combine different disciplines and detailed observations and modelling tools, enabling Mernild to use the glaciers to understand similar patterns elsewhere in the Arctic and around the world. Mernild did so by examining factors ranging from snow composition, glacier area and volume changes to meltwater runoff from Greenland.

In his doctoral thesis defence, Mernild correlated the analyses of the Greenland glacier with his studies of glacier, ice sheet and climate conditions in the northern North Atlantic region, to the ice sheet and to other glaciers and ice sheets on the globe.

== Memberships in committees and commissions ==
Mernild has been a member of a number of organizations and committees. List:

- 2016-2020: Board member of Bjerknes Centre for Climate Research.
- 2010–present: Member of the International Commission on Snow and Ice Hydrology (ICSIH), under International Association of Hydrological Sciences (IAHS).
- 2015-2029: Vice President of the International Commission on Snow and Ice Hydrology (ICSIH), under International Association of Hydrological Sciences (IAHS).
- 2014-2018: Member of the Climate and Cryosphere (CLiC) Scientific Steering Group, under the World Climate Research Programme at World Meteorological Organization, United Nations.

== Awards ==
In 2018, he was awarded the Danish Broadcast Corporation's prestigious dissemination award, the Rosenkjær Prize, which since 1963 has been awarded to prominent scientists and cultural figures who have succeeded in communicating complex scientific topics.

In 2002, he won the University of Copenhagen's silver medal for his Price Dissertation on hydrology.

== Personal life ==
Mernild is married to educational psychologist Birgitte Therkildsen, and together they have two children.

== Selected works and publications ==
=== IPCC duties ===
Mernild has been an IPCC author for the United Nations since 2010. Initially a contributing author on the IPCC Fifth Assessment Report, he was most recently lead author on the IPCC Sixth Assessment Report.

=== International reports ===
- Lead Participant: IMBIE Team (2020). "Mass balance of the Greenland Ice Sheet from 1992 to 2018". Nature. 579 (7798). Ice Sheet Mass Balance Inter-comparison Exercise (IMBIE): 233–239. doi:10.1038/s41586-019-1855-2. hdl:1874/407943. ISSN 1476-4687. PMID 31822019. S2CID 219146922. Wikidata ()
- Lead author: Snow, Water, Ice and Permafrost in the Arctic (SWIPA) 2017 (Report). Vol. XIV. Oslo: [[Arctic Council#Working groups, programs and action plans|Arctic Monitoring and Assessment Programme (AMAP)]]. 2017. ISBN 978-82-7971-101-8.
- Contributing author: The Arctic Freshwater System in a Changing Climate (Report). WCRP Climate and Cryosphere (CliC) Project, Arctic Monitoring and Assessment Programme (AMAP), International Arctic Science Committee (IASC). 2016. ISBN 978-82-7971-097-4. OCLC 981102448.
- Author: Arctic Report Card 2012 (Report). Washington, D.C.: National Oceanic and Atmospheric Administration - Arctic Report Card. 2013. OCLC 951586159. Wikidata ()
- Author: Arctic Report Card 2011 (Report). Washington, D.C.: National Oceanic and Atmospheric Administration - Arctic Report Card. 2012. OCLC 1059243645. Wikidata ()
- Lead author: Melting snow and ice: a call for action (Report). Center for Ice, Climate and Ecosystems, Norwegian Polar Institute. 2009. ISBN 978-82-7666-264-1. OCLC 770710446.

=== Journals ===
- Mernild, Sebastian H.; Liston, Glen E.; Hiemstra, Christopher A.; Yde, Jacob C.; Casassa, Gino (2018). "Annual River Runoff Variations and Trends for the Andes Cordillera". Journal of Hydrometeorology. 19 (7): 1167–1189. Bibcode:2018JHyMe..19.1167M. doi:10.1175/JHM-D-17-0094.1. hdl:11250/2589925. ISSN 1525-755X. Wikidata ()
- Mernild, Sebastian H.; Liston, Glen E.; van As, Dirk; Hasholt, Bent; Yde, Jacob C. (2018). "High-resolution ice sheet surface mass-balance and spatiotemporal runoff simulations: Kangerlussuaq, west Greenland". Arctic, Antarctic, and Alpine Research. 50 (1): S100008. Bibcode:2018AAAR...50S0008M. doi:10.1080/15230430.2017.1415856. hdl:11250/2582312. ISSN 1523-0430. S2CID 133691505. Wikidata ()
- Mernild, Sebastian H.; Beckerman, Andrew P.; Knudsen, Niels Tvis; Hasholt, Bent; Yde, Jacob C. (2018). "Statistical EOF analysis of spatiotemporal glacier mass-balance variability: a case study of Mittivakkat Gletscher, SE Greenland". Danish Journal of Geography. 118 (1): 1–16. Bibcode:2018GeTid.118....1M. doi:10.1080/00167223.2017.1386581. ISSN 0016-7223. S2CID 134082118. Wikidata ()
- Mernild, Sebastian H.; Liston, Glen E.; Hiemstra, Christopher A.; Malmros, Jeppe K.; Yde, Jacob C.; McPhee, James (2017). "The Andes Cordillera. Part I: snow distribution, properties, and trends (1979–2014)". International Journal of Climatology. 37 (4): 1680–1698. Bibcode:2017IJCli..37.1680M. doi:10.1002/joc.4804. hdl:10533/228130. ISSN 1097-0088. S2CID 131936455. Wikidata ()
- Mernild, Sebastian H.; Liston, Glen E.; Hiemstra, Christopher A.; Yde, Jacob C.; McPhee, James; Malmros, Jeppe K. (2017). "The Andes Cordillera. Part II: Rio Olivares Basin snow conditions (1979-2014), central Chile: Snow conditions, Central Chile". International Journal of Climatology. 37 (4): 1699–1715. doi:10.1002/joc.4828. hdl:10533/228131. S2CID 132865275. Wikidata ()
- Mernild, Sebastian H.; Liston, Glen E.; Hiemstra, Christopher; Wilson, Ryan (2017). "The Andes Cordillera. Part III: glacier surface mass balance and contribution to sea level rise (1979–2014)". International Journal of Climatology. 37 (7): 3154–3174. Bibcode:2017IJCli..37.3154M. doi:10.1002/joc.4907. hdl:10533/228132. ISSN 1097-0088. S2CID 132421064.
- Mernild, Sebastian H.; Liston, Glen E.; Hiemstra, Christopher; Beckerman, Andrew P.; Yde, Jacob C.; McPhee, James (2017). "The Andes Cordillera. Part IV: spatio-temporal freshwater run-off distribution to adjacent seas (1979–2014)". International Journal of Climatology. 37 (7): 3175–3196. Bibcode:2017IJCli..37.3175M. doi:10.1002/joc.4922. hdl:10533/228134. ISSN 1097-0088. S2CID 132462141. Wikidata ()
- Mernild, Sebastian H.; Liston, Glen E.; Beckerman, Andrew P.; Yde, Jacob C. (2017-10-24). "Reconstruction of the Greenland Ice Sheet surface mass balance and the spatiotemporal distribution of freshwater runoff from Greenland to surrounding seas". The Cryosphere Discussions: 1–50. doi:10.5194/tc-2017-234. ISSN 1994-0416.
- Mernild, S. H; Beckerman, A. P.; Yde, J. C.; Hanna, E.; Malmros, J. K.; Wilson, R.; Zemp, M. (2015-10-01). "Mass loss and imbalance of glaciers along the Andes Cordillera to the sub-Antarctic islands". Global and Planetary Change. 133: 109–119. Bibcode:2015GPC...133..109M. doi:10.1016/j.gloplacha.2015.08.009. hdl:10533/147773. ISSN 0921-8181. Wikidata ()
- Mernild, Sebastian H.; Malmros, Jeppe K.; Yde, Jacob C.; Wilson, Ryan; Knudsen, Niels T.; Hanna, Edward; Fausto, Robert S.; As, Dirk van (2015). "Albedo decline on Greenland's Mittivakkat Gletscher in a warming climate". International Journal of Climatology. 35 (9): 2294–2307. Bibcode:2015IJCli..35.2294M. doi:10.1002/joc.4128. hdl:10533/147827. ISSN 1097-0088. S2CID 129166192. Wikidata ()
- Mernild, Sebastian H.; Holland, David M.; Holland, Denise; Rosing-Asvid, Aqqalu; Yde, Jacob C.; Liston, Glen E.; Steffen, Konrad (2015-05-01). "Freshwater Flux and Spatiotemporal Simulated Runoff Variability into Ilulissat Icefjord, West Greenland, Linked to Salinity and Temperature Observations near Tidewater Glacier Margins Obtained Using Instrumented Ringed Seals". Journal of Physical Oceanography. 45 (5): 1426–1445. Bibcode:2015JPO....45.1426M. doi:10.1175/JPO-D-14-0217.1. hdl:10533/147786. ISSN 0022-3670. S2CID 55329058. Wikidata ()
- Mernild, Sebastian H.; Malmros, Jeppe K.; Yde, Jacob C.; Villiers, Simon De; Knudsen, Niels Tvis; Wilson, Ryan (2015-01-02). "Glacier changes in the circumpolar Arctic and sub-Arctic, mid-1980s to late-2000s/2011". Danish Journal of Geography. 115 (1): 39–56. Bibcode:2015GeTid.115...39M. doi:10.1080/00167223.2015.1026917. hdl:10533/147770. ISSN 0016-7223. S2CID 129913791. Wikidata ()
- Mernild, Sebastian H.; Hanna, Edward; McConnell, Joseph R.; Sigl, Michael; Beckerman, Andrew P.; Yde, Jacob C.; Cappelen, John; Malmros, Jeppe K.; Steffen, Konrad (2015). "Greenland precipitation trends in a long-term instrumental climate context (1890–2012): evaluation of coastal and ice core records". International Journal of Climatology. 35 (2): 303–320. Bibcode:2015IJCli..35..303M. doi:10.1002/joc.3986. hdl:10533/147828. ISSN 1097-0088. S2CID 129266792. Wikidata ()
- Mernild, Sebastian H.; Hanna, Edward; McConnell, Joseph R.; Sigl, Michael; Beckerman, Andrew P.; Yde, Jacob C.; Cappelen, John; Malmros, Jeppe K.; Steffen, Konrad (2015). "Greenland precipitation trends in a long-term instrumental climate context (1890–2012): evaluation of coastal and ice core records". International Journal of Climatology. 35 (2): 303–320. Bibcode:2015IJCli..35..303M. doi:10.1002/joc.3986. hdl:10533/147828. ISSN 1097-0088. S2CID 129266792. Wikidata ()
- Mernild, Sebastian H.; Hanna, Edward; Yde, Jacob C.; Cappelen, John; Malmros, Jeppe K. (2014). "Coastal Greenland air temperature extremes and trends 1890-2010: annual and monthly analysis: Evaluation of annual to monthly records". International Journal of Climatology. 34 (5): 1472–1487. doi:10.1002/joc.3777. hdl:10533/147912. S2CID 128784763. Wikidata ()
- Mernild, S. H.; Lipscomb, W. H.; Bahr, D. B.; Radić, V.; Zemp, M. (2013). "Global glacier changes: a revised assessment of committed mass losses and sampling uncertainties". The Cryosphere. 7 (5): 1565–1577. Bibcode:2013TCry....7.1565M. doi:10.5194/tc-7-1565-2013. hdl:10533/147913. ISSN 1994-0416. Wikidata ()
- Mernild, Sebastian H.; Liston, Glen E.; Hiemstra, Christopher A. (2014-08-01). "Northern Hemisphere Glacier and Ice Cap Surface Mass Balance and Contribution to Sea Level Rise". Journal of Climate. 27 (15): 6051–6073. Bibcode:2014JCli...27.6051M. doi:10.1175/JCLI-D-13-00669.1. hdl:10533/147836. ISSN 0894-8755.
- Hanna, Edward; Mernild, Sebastian H; Cappelen, John; Steffen, Konrad (2012-12-01). "Recent warming in Greenland in a long-term instrumental (1881–2012) climatic context: I. Evaluation of surface air temperature records". Environmental Research Letters. 7 (4) 045404. Bibcode:2012ERL.....7d5404H. doi:10.1088/1748-9326/7/4/045404. ISSN 1748-9326. S2CID 59058790.
- Mernild, Sebastian H.; Liston, Glen E. (2012-09-01). "Greenland Freshwater Runoff. Part II: Distribution and Trends, 1960–2010". Journal of Climate. 25 (17): 6015–6035. Bibcode:2012JCli...25.6015M. doi:10.1175/JCLI-D-11-00592.1. ISSN 0894-8755.
