= Geert Jan van Oldenborgh =

Dutch climatologist and physicist (1961–2021)

- Born: October 22, 1961; Rotterdam (Kingdom of the Netherlands)
- Died: October 12, 2021 (aged 59); Gouda (Kingdom of the Netherlands)
- Alma mater: Leiden University; Pearson College UWC; University of Amsterdam
- Occupation: Climatologist; physicist
- Employer: LMU Munich (1990–1992); Paul Scherrer Institute (1992–1994); Royal Netherlands Meteorological Institute (1996–2021); University of Oxford (2019–2021)
- Awards: Knight of the Order of the Netherlands Lion (2021); Time 100 (2021)

Geert Jan van Oldenborgh (22 October 1961 – 12 October 2021) was a Dutch climatologist and physicist. Through his career he studied climate modelling of adverse weather events and was known as a pioneer of attribution science, driving public awareness of how climate change is linked to extreme weather events. He was also the creator of a digital platform, Climate Explorer, an online meteorological data repository and platform for climate data analysis.

He was a recipient of the Order of the Netherlands Lion in 2021. He was also named by Time as one of the 100 most influential people of 2021.

== Early life ==
Geert Jan van Oldenborgh was born on 22 October 1961 in Rotterdam to Jan van Oldenborgh and Wil Lijbrink. His father was a lawyer while his mother was a psychoanalyst. While in school in the Netherlands, he received a scholarship to go to Lester B. Pearson College in Victoria, British Columbia, in Canada. During his time there, he studied Chinese. He obtained his master's degree in theoretical physics from Leiden University in the Netherlands in 1986. He also studied mathematics and Chinese in the university. He completed his PhD from the University of Amsterdam and the Netherlands Institute of Nuclear and High Energy Physics in 1990.

== Career ==
Van Oldenborgh started his teaching and research career at LMU Munich and the Paul Scherrer Institute in Switzerland, where he studied elementary particles before returning to Leiden in 1994. He worked at the Royal Netherlands Meteorological Institute (KNMI) from 1996, and as a professor at Oxford University from 2019.

During his time at the KNMI, he focused on ways to improve forecast accuracy while studying El Niño, the weather phenomenon in the Pacific Ocean which recurs every few years and upsets global weather patterns. He also created the digital platform, Climate Explorer, that serves as a digital repository of vast troves of climate-linked data including global temperature measurements, ozone levels, sea ice levels, rainfall measurements, ocean temperatures, and historical records of cyclones, hurricanes and droughts. Some of the data in the platform goes back to the fourteenth century. His work on the digital platform won him the technology achievement award from the European Meteorological Society.

=== Event attribution ===
Over his career he authored over 150 peer reviewed papers across multiple weather forecasting topics including seasonal forecasting, climate modelling, and event attribution. He was known as a pioneer of attribution science, which has been instrumental in driving public awareness of how climate change is linked to extreme weather. Together with the German climate researcher Friederike Otto, he developed a method to determine the role of climate change shortly after major weather disasters. This led to the establishment of World Weather Attribution, an international network of climate scientists and institutes. Along with other scientists, Van Oldenborgh contributed to studying linkages between climate change induced by human actions and catastrophic events such as droughts, floods, forest fires, and heatwaves. Some of the events that he and his fellow researchers identified as caused or accentuated by human-induced climate change included the 2018 Swedish wildfires, Australian bushfires, 2019 European heat waves, 2021 Siberian wildfires, and the 2021 European floods across Germany and Belgium. One of the group's studies of the 2021 Pacific Northwest heat wave, which spread across the west coast of the United States and Canada, found that the events were directly linked to climate change. Prior to Van Oldenborgh and other researchers' work on event attribution, the general view among scientists was that individual events could not be attributed to climate change. Work led by Van Oldenborgh and his peers proved that they could.

His efforts were also instrumental in performing some of the attributional analyses when the events were fresh in people's minds, this required that the process be shortened by using models that had already been run rather than running models from scratch, a process that he described as 'precooking'. Some of their studies were also released prior to a peer review, with the argument that the basic models and techniques had already been peer-reviewed and published in scientific journals.

Van Oldenborgh contributed to the 2013 global report of the Intergovernmental Panel on Climate Change.

For his works he received in 2021 the Order of the Netherlands Lion and the Europese Technology Achievement Award. In September 2021, Time named him one of the 100 most influential people of 2021.

== Personal life ==
Van Oldenborgh met his future wife, Mandy, a clinical psychologist and psychotherapist in 1982. The couple married in 1987 and went on to have three sons.

In 2013, Van Oldenborgh was diagnosed with multiple myeloma, also known as Kahler's disease, a form of blood cancer. The blood cancer progressed in 2019. Van Oldenborgh died from it on 12 October 2021, aged 59, in Gouda, South Holland.
