= Karen E. Frey =

American Earth scientist

- Education: University of California, Los Angeles
- Scientific career
- Thesis: Establishing a baseline for West Siberia in scenarios of global change: Climate, land cover and stream biogeochemistry (2005)
- Doctoral advisor: Laurence C. Smith
- Website: https://wordpress.clarku.edu/kfrey/

Karen E. Frey is an American Earth scientist at Clark University whose research interests involve the combined use of field measurements, satellite remote sensing, and geospatial analytics to study large-scale linkages between land, atmosphere, ocean, and ice in polar environments. Since 1999, she has conducted field-based research in West and East Siberia, the North Slope of Alaska, as well as the Bering, Chukchi, and Beaufort Seas. Her most recent work focuses on the biological and biogeochemical impacts of sea ice decline in polar shelf environments as well as the hydrological and biogeochemical impacts of terrestrial permafrost degradation across the Arctic.

== Early life and education ==
Frey completed her Bachelor of Arts in Geological Sciences from Cornell University in 1998 before enrolling at University of California, Los Angeles to complete her Master's degree in Geography in 2000. Then, Frey earned her Ph.D. in Geography specializing in arctic science and biogeochemistry from the University of California, Los Angeles in 2005.

== Career ==
In 2007, Frey joined the faculty at the Graduate School of Geography at Clark University as an assistant professor. Frey was the project co-leader on several studies, including the Woodwell Polaris Project, the National Science Foundation Distributed Biological Observatory, and NASA ICESCAPE project.

== Awards ==
Frey is a vice-chair of the Marine Working Group of the International Arctic Science Committee. She has served as the chair of the International Arctic Science Committee that determines the recipient of the award each year. In addition, Frey has led the Arctic Ocean Primary Productivity Arctic Report Card since 2011.
