= Albert Klein Tank =

Professor Albert Klein Tank is Aegis Professor of Climate Science in the University of Bristol's school of geographical sciences.

== Biography ==
Klein Tank was awarded a PhD from Utrecht University in 2004, on Changing temperature and precipitation extremes in Europe’s climate of the 20th Century. He spent 25 years at the Royal Netherlands Meteorological Institute, before working a further six years as head of the British Met Office's Hadley climate research centre.

In May 2022, Klein Tank became the Aegis Professor of Climate Science in the University of Bristol's school of geographical sciences. He is also Scientific Director of Utrecht University's Delta Climate Center.

== Awards and recognition ==
Klein Tank received the Royal Meteorological Society's International Journal of Climatology Award in 2005.
