= List of Canadian whistleblowers =

This is a list of Canadian whistleblowers.

- Peter Bryce
- Shiv Chopra
- Allan Cutler
- Virgil Grandfield
- Alasdair Roberts
- Diane Urquhart
- J Robert Verdun
- Christopher Wylie
