= World Weather Attribution =

Academic collaboration focused on extreme meteorological events

- Abbreviation: WWA
- Established: 2014 (12 years ago)
- Headquarters: (distributed)
- Website: https://www.worldweatherattribution.org/

World Weather Attribution is an academic collaboration studying extreme event attribution, calculations of the impact of climate change on extreme meteorological events such as heat waves, droughts, and storms. When an extreme event occurs, the project computes the likelihood that the occurrence, intensity, and duration of the event was due to climate change. The project specializes in producing reports rapidly, while news of the event is still fresh.

World Weather Attribution was founded in 2014 by climatologists Friederike Otto, who continues as leader, and Geert Jan van Oldenborgh. Participating institutions are Imperial College London, the Royal Netherlands Meteorological Institute, Laboratoire des sciences du climat et de l'environnement, Princeton University, the U.S. National Center for Atmospheric Research, ETH Zurich, IIT Delhi, and climate impact specialists at the Red Cross / Red Crescent Climate Centre.

The WWA response to an extreme meteorological event has three parts:

- Define the event: the geographic region affected, which weather parameters are of interest.
- Gather historical data: weather data from the region from 1950 to the present. From this historical data statistics on normal and extreme weather patterns for the locale can be computed.
- Simulate the event many times with computer models, comparing simulations with present-day greenhouse gas conditions against previous greenhouse-gas conditions.

Results are synthesized into a report and published first rapidly, then eventually through the scientific review process.

== Example incidents ==
The following are examples of extreme cold, flood, heat, and drought events that have been studied by WWA.

- An unusual weather pattern which froze vineyards and other crops in France in spring 2021 was 60% more likely due to climate change.
- Floods in Nigeria and neighboring areas in 2022 were rendered more likely and more intense due to climate change. WWA modeled the June to September rainfall in the Lake Chad and lower Niger river catchment areas, looking at total rainfall and intense rain weeks.
- The 2022 heat wave in India and Pakistan was rendered 30 times more likely and more intense due to climate change.
- A several year drought contributing to famine in Madagascar in 2021 was likely not caused by climate change. WWA studied rainfall in southern Madagascar for the two-year period ending June 2021, concluding that the observed drought had a 1 in 135 chance of occurring, which was only slightly affected by climate change.
