= Friederike Otto =

German British climatologist (born 1982)

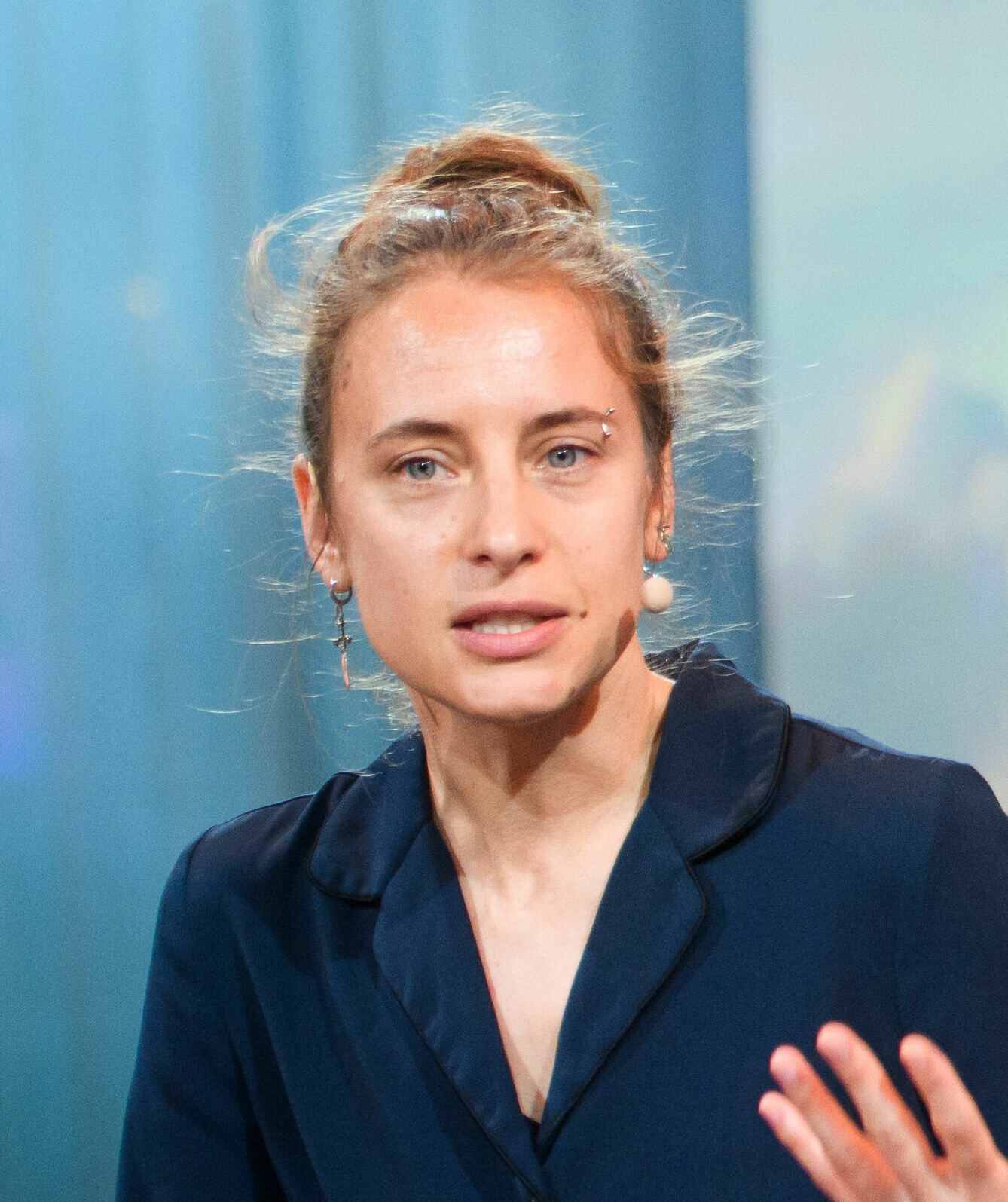
- Born: 29 August 1982 (age 44); Kiel, Schleswig-Holstein, West-Germany
- Education: University of Potsdam; Free University of Berlin (PhD)
- Occupations: Physicist, Climate Scientist
- Website: https://www.worldweatherattribution.org/

Friederike (Fredi) Elly Luise Otto (born 29 August 1982) is a climate scientist and physicist and Professor of Climate Science at Imperial College London. She is an Honorary Research Associate of the Environmental Change Institute (ECI) at the University of Oxford. Her research focuses on answering the question whether and to what extent extreme weather conditions change as a result of external climate drivers. A highly recognised expert in the field of attribution research, she examines the extent to which human-caused climate change as well as vulnerability and exposure are responsible for events such heat waves, droughts and floods. Together with climate scientist Geert Jan van Oldenborgh she founded the international project World Weather Attribution which she still leads. In 2021, she was included in the Time 100, Time's annual list of the 100 most influential people in the world. She was also one of ten scientists who had had important roles in scientific developments in 2021 highlighted in the scientific journal Nature.

== Biography ==
Born in Kiel, Germany, in 1982, Friederike Elly Luise Otto graduated in physics from the University of Potsdam before earning a PhD in philosophy of science from the Free University of Berlin in 2012. At Oxford University she began to investigate the impact of weather events on climate change. In her role as co-leader of World Weather Attribution, she has been able to influence the international development of climate change strategies. In connection with Hurricane Harvey in 2017, she concluded that it caused between 12% and 22% of additional rainfall to fall on Houston. She has also maintained that there is little doubt Hurricane Laura in 2020 was the result of climate change effects. She believes that such attribution reports will help to persuade governments to adopt measures aimed at creating more carbon-neutral communities.

Otto's 2019 book Wütendes Wetter, published in English as Angry Weather, became a best seller and received positive reviews. The book details efforts to show which extreme weather events have been made more likely or more severe due to climate change.

The approach to event attribution she codeveloped has become routine within the climate community. It was assessed as mature in the 2021 IPCC Sixth Assessment Report, in contrast to the 2013 IPCC Fifth Assessment Report, in which it was concluded that the scientific methods to attribute individual extreme events to climate change were not yet fit-for-purpose. Otto also works with lawyers using WWA research to provide expertise for lawsuits aimed at compelling companies or governments to lower their impact on the environment or even seek compensation for victims.

In 2021, she was included in the Time 100, Time's annual list of the 100 most influential people in the world. She was also one of ten scientists who had had important roles in scientific developments in 2021 highlighted in the scientific journal Nature.

Otto also contributed to the feminist book Unlearn Patriarchy, in German and first published in 2022, with a chapter called Unlearn Wissenschaft analysing patriarchal structures in the scientific community.

In her latest book Climate Injustice, Otto describes the exacerbated impact that climate change has on marginalized communities. The book draws on examples of extreme weather events from various geographies to establish explicit links between a range of systemic inequities and the climate crisis. The book was originally published in German in 2023 (Klimaungerechtigkeit: Was die Klimakatastrophe mit Kapitalismus, Rassismus und Sexismus zu tun hat).

== Publications ==
- Wütendes Wetter – Auf der Suche nach den Schuldigen für Hitzewellen, Hochwasser und Stürme Ullstein Berlin, 2019. ISBN 978-3-5500-5092-3
- Angry Weather: Heat Waves, Floods, Storms, and the New Science of Climate Change. English Edition. Greystone Books, 2019. ISBN 978-1-77164-614-7
- Klimaungerechtigkeit: Was die Klimakatastrophe mit Kapitalismus, Rassismus und Sexismus zu tun hat. Ullstein Berlin, 2023. ISBN 978-3-550-20244-5
- Climate Injustice: Why We Need to Fight Global Inequality to Combat Climate Change. English Edition. Greystone Books, 2025. ISBN 978-1-77840-162-6
