= Virgil Grandfield =

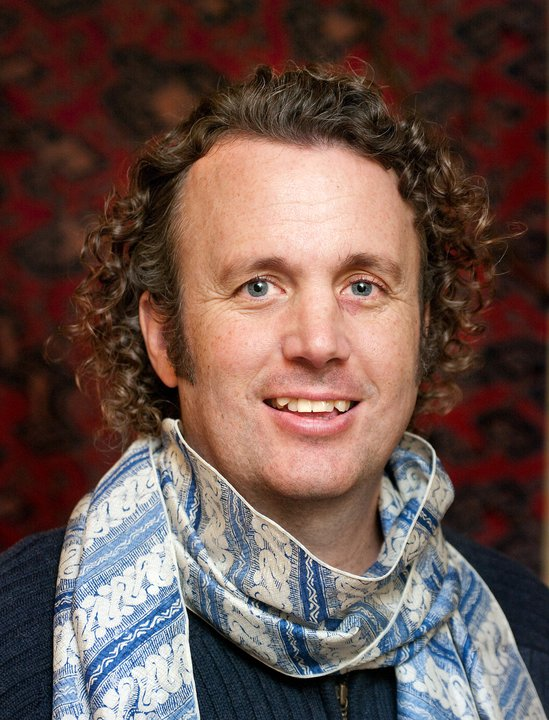
- Virgil Grandfield in his home in Lethbridge, AB, Canada in January 2012.

Virgil Grandfield is a Canadian investigative journalist, former international humanitarian aid worker, and whistleblower who in 2010 revealed slave labour trafficking on Canadian Red Cross and other tsunami-related aid projects in Indonesia.

== Career ==
Grandfield began his career as an aid worker in 1999–2000, when he worked with a project evaluation unit for the Disasters Emergency Committee (the UK funding agency for disasters) in Central America after Hurricane Mitch. He became an Overseas Delegate for the Canadian Red Cross in 2002, after serving as Red Cross team leader on floods on the Blood Reserve in Standoff, Alberta. In 2003-2004 he investigated a growing migrant worker crisis on the U.S.-Mexico border and wrote a cover story about the issue for Red Cross Red Crescent magazine. In 2005–2006, he was an overseas delegate and chief spokesperson for the tsunami operation of the International Federation of Red Cross Red Crescent Societies in Aceh, Indonesia. He returned to Aceh in 2007 to work for the Canadian Red Cross and resigned as a delegate in 2008.

After leaving the Red Cross, in 2009 he returned to Aceh with an investigative and advocacy organization called Brigade Cahaya ("The Light Brigade") which was responsible for uncovering and making public a scandal in which more than 100,000 Javanese construction workers were victims of human trafficking on UN, Red Cross and other NGO tsunami projects in Aceh.

Grandfield was the International Federation of Red Cross and Red Crescent Societies (IFRC) spokesman when in June 2005 an international aid worker was shot in Indonesia's tsunami-hit Aceh province, leading to temporary suspension of aid worker access. In December 2005, Grandfield warned that the new tsunami warning technology would only save lives if it was combined with a community-based communication network. In January 2006, Grandfield commented on the effective use of aid funds in relation to fishing boat increases that might threaten fish stocks.

In June 2009 Grandfield was publicly critical of government management in the health care system in his home province of Alberta in relation to specialized long-term care of elderly disabled patients.

Grandfield quit the Canadian Red Cross in 2008 after many efforts to have his complaints addressed that contractors hired by the Red Cross to rebuild after the 2004 Indian Ocean Tsunami used slave labour. The allegations were that workers brought in from distant jurisdictions, were not paid, and were subjected to manipulation and harsh conditions. This was reported in the Canadian national media in mid-March 2010. The controversy has given rise to two documentary television reports produced by CBC Television and Radio Canada and aired in March 2010. On March 30, 2010, the Green Party of Canada hosted a press conference at the Canadian Parliament, which generated conflicting media reports. On April 6, 2010, it was reported in the media that the Canadian International Development Agency (the main Canadian governmental central international aid agency) had known about the slave labour allegations for two years and did not ask to view the Canadian Red Cross' commissioned investigative report (the Ernst and Young investigation report) on the matter, which has not been released to the media. despite the CanadianRed Cross' earlier promises that it would release the Ernst and Young report to the media. On April 13, 2010, the media reported that, based on leaked Canadian International Development Agency documents, the Harper federal government knew in 2009 that child labour was used in the Canadian tsunami reconstruction effort, and questioned what else the Ernst and Young report might contain that the Canadian Red Cross did not disclose.

In August 2010 it was reported in the media that Grandfield had formed Fish and Dragon Fair Traders out of Lethbridge, Alberta, a cooperative for marketing traditional Indonesian hand-made batik, as a method to help alleviate the causes of human trafficking in that country.

In June 2016, Grandfield won the Canadian National Magazine Awards Foundation gold medal for Investigative Reporting for his article "The Cage", first published by Canadian literary non-fiction magazine Eighteen Bridges in December 2015. "The Cage" is an account of one day of an investigation Grandfield made in 2015 into the murder of a worker on a Red Cross tsunami reconstruction project in Aceh, Indonesia in 2009.
