= Arctic Monitoring and Assessment Programme =

Arctic Council working group

- Abbreviation: AMAP
- Formation: 1991
- Type: Working group
- Region served: High Arctic and sub-Arctic regions
- Parent organization: Arctic Council
- Website: www.amap.no

The Arctic Monitoring and Assessment Programme was established as a working group of the Arctic Council in 1991. Its main function is to advise the governments of the eight Arctic member nations—Canada, Denmark, Finland, Iceland, Norway, Russia, Sweden and the United States—on environment-related issues such as pollution. AMAP's work is a cooperative effort involving scientists and Arctic Indigenous peoples, as well as political representatives of the eight nations.

== Contributions and impact ==
AMAP's monitoring and assessments have informed the United Nations Environment Programme (UNEP), Convention on Long-Range Transboundary Air Pollution (LRTAP), and the World Health Organization (WHO) on issues related to reduction of toxic and polluting chemical emissions.

=== SWIPA ===
The work of the Intergovernmental Panel on Climate Change (IPCC) was influenced significantly by AMAP's assessment reports on "Snow, Water, Ice and Permafrost in the Arctic" (SWIPA). The release of the first SWIPA report, "Climate Change and the Cryosphere", was published for the 2011 Arctic Council ministerial meeting. The United States Department of State urged other member nations to "respond to the SWIPA Assessment’s findings and recommendations". A Polar Science journal article, "The urgency of Arctic change", builds on 2017 AMAP assessments.

=== Arctic Report Card ===
According to the National Oceanic and Atmospheric Administration (NOAA) Pacific Marine Environmental Laboratory (PMEL)—a United States federal laboratory—the annual Arctic Report Card, which tracks the ways in which the environment has changed, undergoes an independent peer review organized by the AMAP. One hundred forty-seven researchers from eleven countries submit eleven essays for the AMAP review.

=== Stockholm Convention on Persistent Organic Pollutants ===
The establishment of AEPS' AMAP was the "fundamental building block" for the Stockholm Convention on Persistent Organic Pollutants (POPs) agreement. From the mid-1980s to 2000, research by atmospheric chemists revealed that POPs contaminating Inuit country food, could be tied to long-range atmospheric transport of POPs from the south to the Arctic.

=== Mercury assessment ===
AMAP undertakes a mercury assessment every ten years. AMAP has collaborated on two of the four peer-reviewed Global Mercury Assessments undertaken by the United Nations Environment Programme (UNEP), including the report published in 2019. In 2002, UNEP published the first Global Mercury Assessment—the second in 2008, the third in 2013, and the fourth in 2018. There reports provided the scientific basis for the Minamata Convention on Mercury—that came into force in August 2017. As part of the Minamata Convention, UNEP undertakes mercury literature reviews every five years in collaboration with AMAP.

In a 2022 Nature Reviews Earth & Environment article, AMAP researchers reported that "200 tonnes of mercury end up in the Arctic Ocean" every year. In the 2010s, scientists focused on mercury contamination caused by human activities. By 2022, understanding of sources of mercury entering the ocean has become more refined—with one third coming from the atmosphere, 25% from ocean currents, 20% from river flows, and 20% from coastal erosion. The significant amount of mercury released from permafrost as it thaws raises concerns about ingestion of mercury by polar bears, pilot whales, narwhals, beluga and hooded seals—the source of food for Inuit in the Arctic.

== History ==
In Murmansk in 1987, then Soviet Secretary-General, Mikhail Gorbachev, introduced the idea of Arctic nations cooperating on various issues including environment protection.

In 1989, discussions began between the eight Arctic nations—Canada, Denmark, Finland, Iceland, Norway, Russia—then the Soviet Union, Sweden and the United States, which resulted in the establishment of the Arctic Environmental Protection Strategy (AEPS) in June 1991 in Rovaniemi, Finland. AMAP—along with four other Working Groups—was established at that time under the AEPS.

AMAP first assessed the Arctic environment—both existing problems and potential problems in the future. In this way, AMAP has been the "core activity of Arctic environmental cooperation" since the beginning.

When the "high-level intergovernmental forum", Arctic Council, was established on September 19, 1996 in Ottawa, Canada, it was mandated to oversee and coordinate the five Working Groups, including the AMAP. The integration of the AEPS programmes within the Arctic Council was finalized in 1997 in Norway.

In 2003, the Inuit Circumpolar Council (ICC) assisted the AMAP in the preparation of its circumpolar assessment.

== Mandate ==
The AMAP monitors and assesses components of the AEPS. Starting in 1996, AMAP focused its monitoring and assessments in the Arctic on chemical and radioactive contaminants.

AMAP's research covers the High Arctic and sub-Arctic regions in the circumpolar Arctic.

== See also ==
- Arctic Council
