= Advances in Atmospheric Sciences =

- Discipline: Atmospheric sciences
- Language: English
- Edited by: Mu Mu, Junji Cao, Ming Xue

Publication details
- History: 1984–present
- Publisher: Springer Science+Business Media and Science Press
- Frequency: Bimonthly
- Open access: Hybrid
- Impact factor: 3.158 (2020)

Standard abbreviations
- ISO 4: Adv. Atmos. Sci.

Indexing
- ISSN: 0256-1530 (print); 1861-9533 (web)
- LCCN: sn86016139
- OCLC no.: 67618364

Links
- Journal homepage; Online access

Advances in Atmospheric Sciences is a bimonthly peer-reviewed scientific journal co-published by Springer Science+Business Media and Science Press. It covers research on the dynamics, physics and chemistry of the atmosphere and oceans, including weather systems, numerical weather prediction, climate dynamics and variability, and satellite meteorology. It was established in 1984. The editors-in-chief are Mu Mu, Junji Cao, and Ming Xue. According to the Journal Citation Reports, the journal has a 2020 impact factor of 3.158.
