= Red Cross Red Crescent =

Official magazine for the International Red Cross Red Crescent movement

Red Cross Red Crescent is the official magazine for the International Red Cross Red Crescent movement, published jointly by the International Committee of the Red Cross and the International Federation of Red Cross and Red Crescent National Societies, both based in Geneva, Switzerland. The magazine was launched in 1987. It is published three times a year in Arabic, Chinese, English, French, Russian and Spanish and is available in 190 countries, with a circulation of more than 70,000.
