= Extreme weather =

Unusual, severe or unseasonal weather

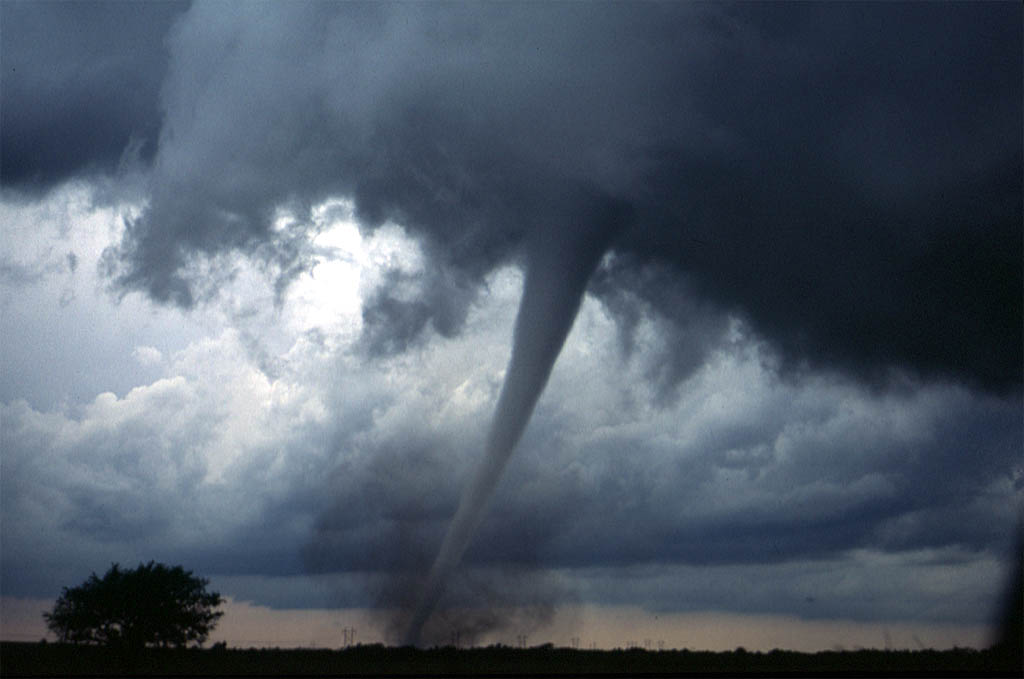
A tornado is an example of an extreme weather event.

Extreme weather includes unexpected, unusual, severe, or unseasonal weather— weather which is at the extremes of the historical distribution, i.e., the range that has been seen in the past. Extreme events are based on a location's recorded weather history. The main types of extreme weather include heat waves, cold waves, droughts, and heavy precipitation or storm events, such as tropical cyclones. Extreme weather can have various effects, from natural hazards such as floods and landslides to social costs on human health and the economy. Severe weather is a particular type of extreme weather which poses risks to life and property.

Weather patterns in a given region vary with time, and so extreme weather can be attributed, at least in part, to the natural climate variability that exists on Earth. For example, the El Niño–Southern Oscillation (ENSO) or the North Atlantic oscillation (NAO) are climate phenomena that impact weather patterns worldwide. Generally speaking, one event in extreme weather cannot be attributed to any one single cause. However, certain system wide changes to global weather systems can lead to increased frequency or intensity of extreme weather events.

Climate change might make some extreme weather events more frequent and more intense. This applies in particular to heat waves and cold waves. The extreme event attribution sector looks at possible explanations behind extreme events. Climate models indicate that rising temperatures might make extreme weather events worse worldwide.

Extreme weather has serious impacts on human society and on ecosystems. There is loss of human lives, damage to infrastructure and ecosystem destruction. Some human activities can exacerbate the effects, for example poor urban planning, wetland destruction, and building homes along floodplains.

== Definition ==
One way of judging which weather events are extreme involves selecting events that exceed a certain threshold of intensity (or frequency, or impact, etc., not shown). This threshold might select events lying above a certain percentile or beyond a certain number of standard deviations above average. In the field of extreme event attribution, climate models then process the climate characteristics underlying the selected events for comparison to models of climates in which man-made climate drivers are excluded.

Extreme weather describes unusual weather events that are at the extremes of the historical distribution for a given area. The IPCC Sixth Assessment Report defines an extreme weather event as follows: "An event that is rare at a particular place and time of year. Definitions of 'rare' vary, but an extreme weather event would normally be as rare as or rarer than the 10th or 90th percentile of a probability density function estimated from observations."Aside from being rare, extreme weather can also be determined by the severity, rate or effects of a specific weather episode. In fact, weather can be designated as extreme not only when it is statistically uncommon, but also when it causes substantial disruption to the impacted community or ecosystem.

In contrast, the World Meteorological Organization define severe weather as any aspect of the weather that poses risks to life, property or requires the intervention of authorities. Severe weather is thus a particular type of extreme weather.

== Types ==
Definitions of extreme weather vary in different parts of the community, changing the outcomes of research from those fields. Types of extreme weather can include, but are not limited to, heavy precipitation, droughts, heat waves, cold waves, tornadoes, and hurricanes.

=== Heat waves ===
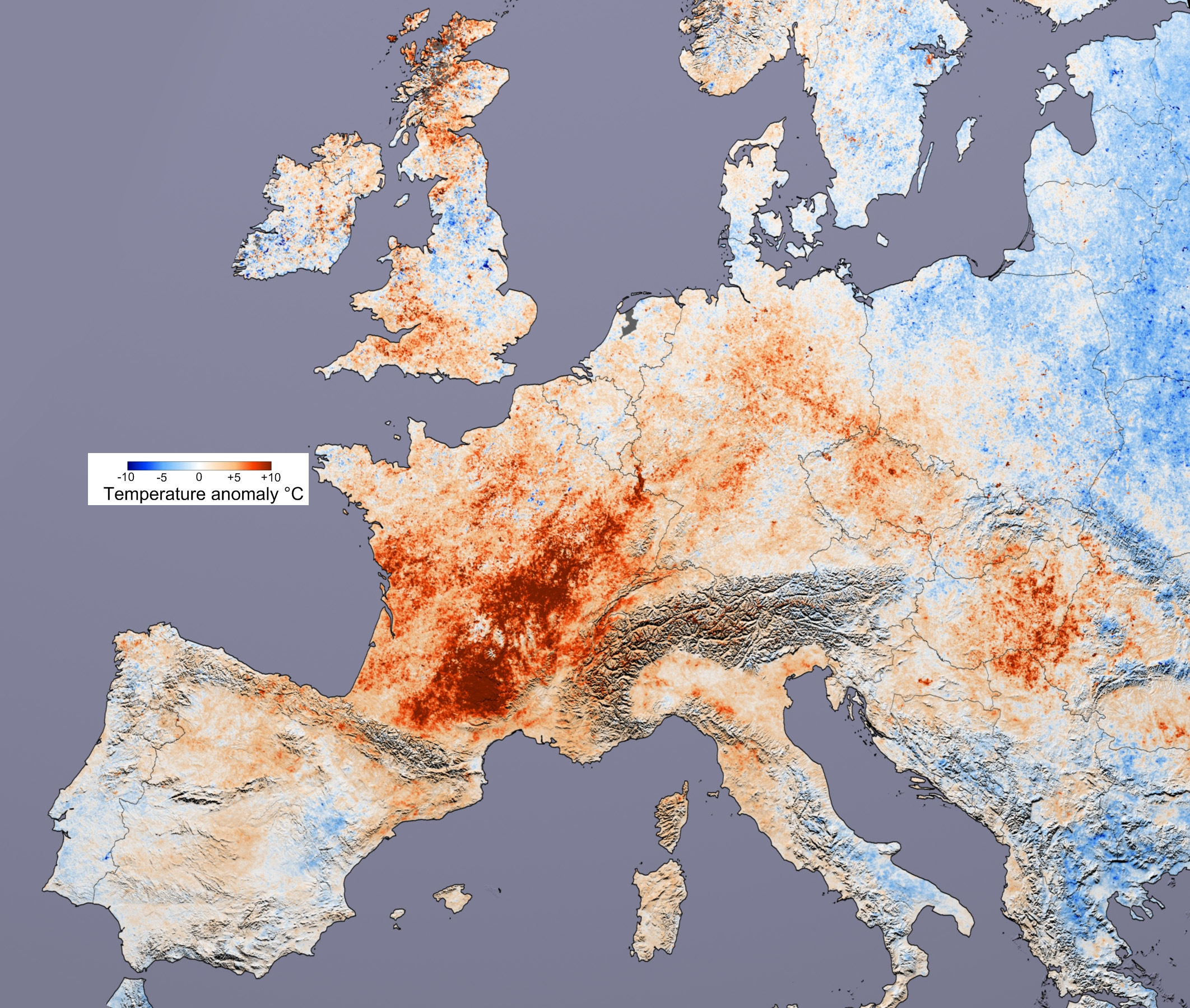
2003 European heat wave

US heat waves have increased in frequency, average duration, and intensity.

Also, heat wave seasons have grown in length.

Over decades, the average number of days spent in heat waves in the U.S. annually has increased, based on increases in both the average annual number of heat waves and on their average durations.

Heat waves are periods of abnormally high temperatures and heat index. Definitions of a heatwave vary because of the variation of temperatures in different geographic locations. Excessive heat is often accompanied by high levels of humidity, but can also be catastrophically dry.

Because heat waves are not visible as other forms of severe weather, like hurricanes, tornadoes, and thunderstorms, they are one of the less known forms of extreme weather. Severely hot weather can damage populations and crops due to potential dehydration or hyperthermia, heat cramps, heat expansion, and heat stroke. Dried soils are more susceptible to erosion, decreasing lands available for agriculture. Outbreaks of wildfires can increase in frequency as dry vegetation has an increased likelihood of igniting. The evaporation of bodies of water can be devastating to marine populations, decreasing the size of the habitats available as well as the amount of nutrition present within the waters. Livestock and other animal populations may decline as well.

During excessive heat, plants shut their leaf pores (stomata), a protective mechanism to conserve water but also curtails plants' absorption capabilities. This leaves more pollution and ozone in the air, which leads to higher mortality in the population. It has been estimated that extra pollution during the hot summer of 2006 in the UK, cost 460 lives. The European heat waves from summer 2003 are estimated to have caused 30,000 excess deaths, due to heat stress and air pollution. Over 200 U.S cities have registered new record high temperatures. The worst heat wave in the US occurred in 1936 and killed more than 5000 people directly. The worst heat wave in Australia occurred in 1938–39 and killed 438. The second worst was in 1896.

Power outages can also occur within areas experiencing heat waves due to the increased demand for electricity (i.e. air conditioning use). The urban heat island effect can increase temperatures, particularly overnight.

=== Cold waves ===
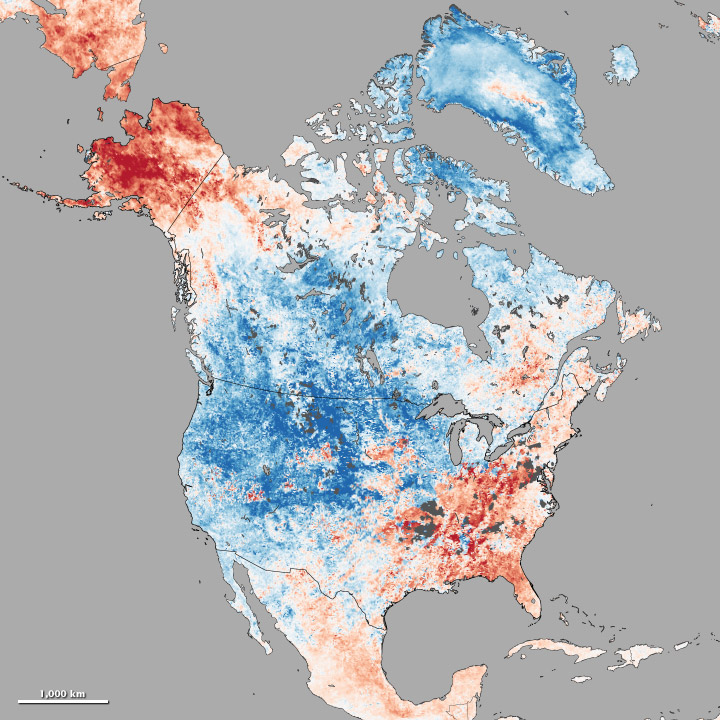
Cold wave in continental North America from Dec. 3–10, 2013. Red color means above mean temperature; blue represents below normal temperature.

A cold wave is a weather phenomenon that is distinguished by a cooling of the air. Specifically, as used by the U.S. National Weather Service, a cold wave is a rapid fall in temperature within a 24-hour period requiring substantially increased protection for agriculture, industry, commerce, and social activities. The precise criterion for a cold wave is determined by the rate at which the temperature falls, and the minimum to which it falls. This minimum temperature is dependent on the geographical region and time of year. Cold waves generally are capable of occurring at any geological location and are formed by large cool air masses that accumulate over certain regions, caused by movements of air streams.

A cold wave can cause death and injury to livestock and wildlife. Exposure to cold mandates greater caloric intake for all animals, including humans, and if a cold wave is accompanied by heavy and persistent snow, grazing animals may be unable to reach necessary food and water, and die of hypothermia or starvation. Cold waves often necessitate the purchase of fodder for livestock at a considerable cost to farmers. Human populations can be inflicted with frostbite when exposed for extended periods of time to cold and may result in the loss of limbs or damage to internal organs.

Extreme winter cold often causes poorly insulated water pipes to freeze. Even some poorly protected indoor plumbing may rupture as frozen water expands within them, causing property damage. Fires, paradoxically, become more hazardous during extreme cold. Water mains may break and water supplies may become unreliable, making firefighting more difficult.

Cold waves that bring unexpected freezes and frosts during the growing season in mid-latitude zones can kill plants during the early and most vulnerable stages of growth. This results in crop failure as plants are killed before they can be harvested economically. Such cold waves have caused famines. Cold waves can also cause soil particles to harden and freeze, making it harder for plants and vegetation to grow within these areas. One extreme was the so-called Year Without a Summer of 1816, one of several years during the 1810s in which numerous crops failed during freakish summer cold snaps after volcanic eruptions reduced incoming sunlight.

In some cases more frequent extremely cold winter weather – i.e. across parts of Asia and North America including the February 2021 North American cold wave – can be a result of climate change such as due to changes in the Arctic. However, conclusions that link climate change to cold waves are considered to still be controversial. The JRC PESETA IV project concluded in 2020 that overall climate change will result in a decline in the intensity and frequency of extreme cold spells, with milder winters reducing fatalities from extreme cold, even if individual cold extreme weather may sometimes be caused by changes due to climate change and possibly even become more frequent in some regions. According to a 2023 study, "weak extreme cold events (ECEs) significantly decrease in frequency, projection area and total area over the north hemisphere with global warming. However, the frequency, projection area and total area of strong ECEs show no significant trend, whereas they are increasing in Siberia and Canada."

=== Heavy rain and storms ===
The amount of water vapor in Earth's atmosphere has risen over recent decades with global warming, making heavy rainfall events more severe.

==== Tropical cyclones ====
Terminology for tropical cyclones on a world map

A tropical cyclone is a rapidly rotating storm system with a low-pressure area, a closed low-level atmospheric circulation, strong winds, and a spiral arrangement of thunderstorms that produce heavy rain and squalls. Depending on its location and strength, a tropical cyclone is called a hurricane (/ˈhʌrɪkən, -keɪn/), typhoon (/taɪˈfuːn/), tropical storm, cyclonic storm, tropical depression, or simply cyclone. A hurricane is a strong tropical cyclone that occurs in the Atlantic Ocean or northeastern Pacific Ocean. A typhoon is the same thing which occurs in the northwestern Pacific Ocean. In the Indian Ocean and South Pacific, comparable storms are referred to as "tropical cyclones". In modern times, on average around 80 to 90 named tropical cyclones form each year around the world, over half of which develop hurricane-force winds of 65 kn (120 km/h; 75 mph) or more.

Tropical cyclones typically form over large bodies of relatively warm water. They derive their energy through the evaporation of water from the ocean surface, which ultimately condenses into clouds and rain when moist air rises and cools to saturation. This energy source differs from that of mid-latitude cyclonic storms, such as nor'easters and European windstorms, which are powered primarily by horizontal temperature contrasts. Tropical cyclones are typically between 100 and 2,000 km (62 and 1,243 mi) in diameter. The strong rotating winds of a tropical cyclone are a result of the conservation of angular momentum imparted by the Earth's rotation as air flows inwards toward the axis of rotation. As a result, cyclones rarely form within 5° of the equator. South Atlantic tropical cyclones are very rare due to consistently strong wind shear and a weak Intertropical Convergence Zone. In contrast, the African easterly jet and areas of atmospheric instability give rise to cyclones in the Atlantic Ocean and Caribbean Sea.

=== Drought ===
A shift in rainfall patterns can lead to greater amounts of precipitation in one area while another experiences much hotter, drier conditions, which can lead to drought. This is because an increase in temperatures also lead to an increase in evaporation at the surface of the earth, so more precipitation does not necessarily mean universally wetter conditions or a worldwide increase in drinking water.

== Causes and attribution ==
=== Attribution research ===
Generally speaking, one event in extreme weather cannot be attributed to any one cause. However, certain system wide changes to global weather systems can lead to increased frequency or intensity of extreme weather events.

Early research in extreme weather focused on statements about predicting certain events. Contemporary research focuses more on the attribution of causes to trends in events. In particular the field is focusing on climate change alongside other causal factors for these events.

A 2016 report from the National Academies of Sciences, Engineering, and Medicine, recommended investing in improved shared practices across the field working on attribution research, improving the connection between research outcomes and weather forecasting.

As more research is done in this area, scientists have begun to investigate the connection between climate change and extreme weather events and what future impacts may arise. Much of this work is done through climate modeling. Climate models provide important predictions about the future characteristics of the atmosphere, oceans, and Earth using data collected in the modern day. However, while climate models are vital for studying more complex processes such as climate change or ocean acidification, they are still only approximations. Moreover, weather events are complex and cannot be tied to a singular cause—there are often many atmospheric variables such as temperature, pressure, or moisture to note on top of any influences from climate change or natural variability.

=== Natural variability ===
Aspects of our climate system have a certain level of natural variability, and extreme weather events can occur for several reasons beyond human impact, including changes in pressure or the movement of air. Areas along the coast or located in tropical regions are more likely to experience storms with heavy precipitation than temperate regions, although such events can occur.

The atmosphere is a complex and dynamic system, influenced by several factors such as the natural tilt and orbit of the Earth, the absorption or reflection of solar radiation, the movement of air masses, and the water cycle. Due to this, weather patterns can experience some variation, and so extreme weather can be attributed, at least in part, to the natural climate variability that exists on Earth.

Climatic phenomena such as the El Niño-Southern Oscillation (ENSO) or the North Atlantic oscillation (NAO) impact weather patterns in specific regions of the world, influencing temperature and precipitation. The record-breaking extreme weather events that have been catalogued throughout the past two hundred years most likely arise when climate patterns like ENSO or NAO work "in the same direction as human‐induced warming."

=== Climate change ===
The IPCC Sixth Assessment Report (2021) projects progressively large increases in both the frequency (horizontal bars) and intensity (vertical bars) of extreme weather events, for increasing degrees of global warming—including more than a 5 °C increase in extreme heat events for a 4 °C global average temperature increase.

Climate Central's review of climate attribution studies covered almost 750 extreme weather events and trends, of various event types. The review found that climate change made almost all studied event types substantially more likely or more severe—with cold/snow/ice events being the exception.

Analyzing >250 US cities, all but two experienced fewer freezing days in 2025 than in 1956. In 2025, on average, freezing days began 11 days later and ended 26 days earlier.

Some studies assert a connection between rapidly warming arctic temperatures and thus a vanishing cryosphere to extreme weather in mid-latitudes. In a study published in Nature in 2019, scientists used several simulations to determine that the melting of ice sheets in Greenland and Antarctica could affect overall sea level and sea temperature. Other models have shown that modern temperature rise and the subsequent addition of meltwater to the ocean could lead to a disruption of the thermohaline circulation, which is responsible for the movement of seawater and distribution of heat around the globe. A collapse of this circulation in the northern hemisphere could lead to an increase in extreme temperatures in Europe, as well as more frequent storms by throwing off natural climate variability and conditions. Thus, as increasing temperatures cause glaciers to melt, mid-latitudes could experience shifts in weather patterns or temperatures.

There were around 6,681 climate-related events reported during 2000–2019, compared to 3,656 climate-related events reported during 1980–1999. In this report, a 'climate-related event' refers to floods, storms, droughts, landslides, extreme temperatures (like heat waves or freezes), and wildfires; it excludes geophysical events such as volcanic eruptions, earthquakes, or mass movements. While there is evidence that a changing global climate, such as an increase in temperature, has impacted the frequency of extreme weather events, the most significant effects are likely to arise in the future. This is where climate models are useful, for they can provide simulations of how the atmosphere may behave over time and what steps need to be taken in the present day to mitigate any negative changes.

The increasing probability of record week-long heat extremes occurrence depends on warming rate, rather than global warming level.

Some researchers attribute increases in extreme weather occurrences to more reliable reporting systems. A difference in what qualifies as 'extreme weather' in varying climate systems could also be argued. Over or under reporting of casualties or losses can lead to inaccuracy in the impact of extreme weather. However, the UN reports show that, although some countries have experienced greater effects, there have been increases in extreme weather events on all continents. Current evidence and climate models show that an increasing global temperature will intensify extreme weather events around the globe, thereby amplifying human loss, damages and economic costs, and ecosystem destruction.

==== Tropical cyclones and climate change ====
Worldwide, the average annual number of Category 5 storms has doubled since 1982.

Category 5 Atlantic hurricanes have become much more common in recent decades.

The number of $1 billion Atlantic hurricanes almost doubled since the 1980s, and costs have increased >elevenfold. Increases are attributed to climate change and to people moving to coastal areas.

In 2020, the National Oceanic and Atmospheric Administration (NOAA) of the U.S. government predicted that, over the 21st Century, the frequency of tropical storms and Atlantic hurricanes would decline by 25 percent while their maximum intensity would rise by 5 percent.

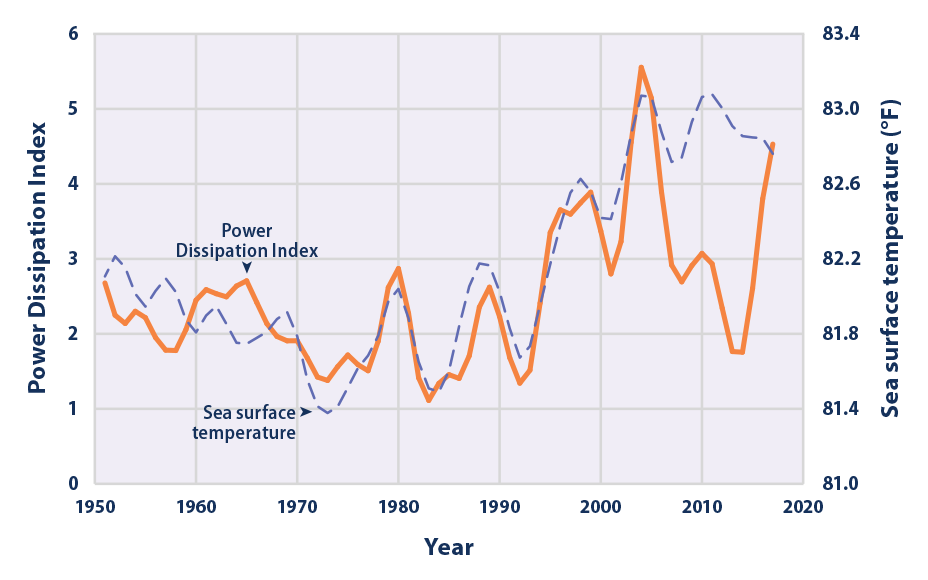
North Atlantic tropical cyclone activity according to the Power Dissipation Index, 1949–2015. Sea surface temperature has been plotted alongside the PDI to show how they compare. The lines have been smoothed using a five-year weighted average, plotted at the middle year.

Climate change affects tropical cyclones in a variety of ways: an intensification of rainfall and wind speed, an increase in the frequency of very intense storms and a poleward extension of where the cyclones reach maximum intensity are among the consequences of human-induced climate change. Tropical cyclones use warm, moist air as their source of energy or fuel. As climate change is warming ocean temperatures, there is potentially more of this fuel available.

Between 1979 and 2017, there was a global increase in the proportion of tropical cyclones of Category 3 and higher on the Saffir–Simpson scale. The trend was most clear in the north Indian Ocean, North Atlantic and in the Southern Indian Ocean. In the north Indian Ocean, particularly the Arabian Sea, the frequency, duration, and intensity of cyclones have increased significantly. There has been a 52% increase in the number of cyclones in the Arabian Sea, while the number of very severe cyclones have increased by 150%, during 1982–2019. Meanwhile, the total duration of cyclones in the Arabian Sea has increased by 80% while that of very severe cyclones has increased by 260%. In the North Pacific, tropical cyclones have been moving poleward into colder waters and there was no increase in intensity over this period. With 2 °C (3.6 °F) warming, a greater percentage (+13%) of tropical cyclones are expected to reach Category 4 and 5 strength. A 2019 study indicates that climate change has been driving the observed trend of rapid intensification of tropical cyclones in the Atlantic basin. Rapidly intensifying cyclones are hard to forecast and therefore pose additional risk to coastal communities.

==== Floods ====
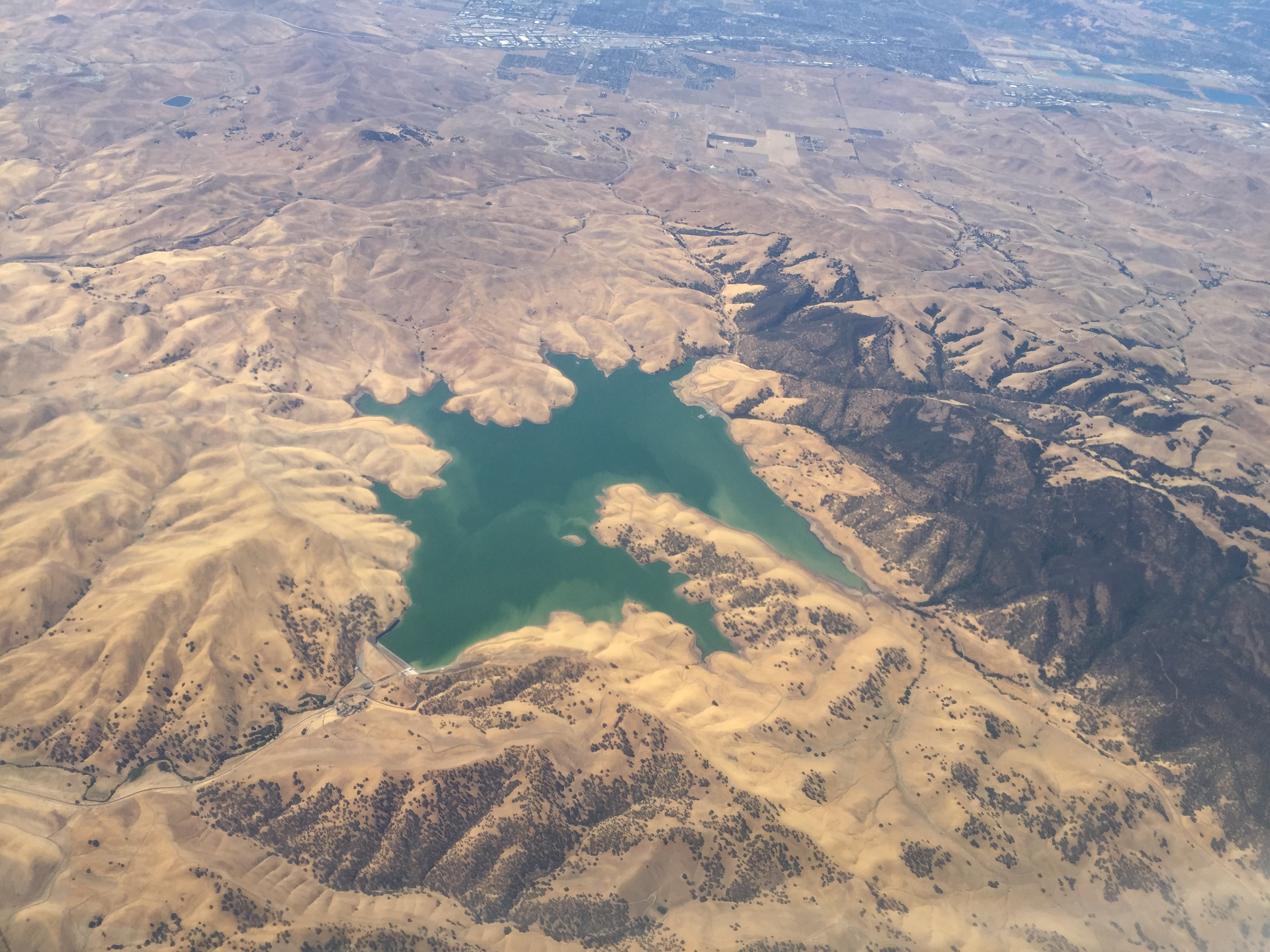
A California reservoir in 2015 with low water levels due to drought conditions. From 2011 to 2017, California experienced one of its driest periods in recorded history.

Climate change has led to an increase in the frequency and/or intensity of certain types of extreme weather. Storms such as hurricanes or tropical cyclones may experience greater rainfall, causing major flooding events or landslides by saturating soil. This is because warmer air is able to 'hold' more moisture due to the water molecules having increased kinetic energy, and precipitation occurs at a greater rate because more molecules have the critical speed needed to fall as rain drops.

=== Human activities that exacerbate the effects ===
There are plenty of anthropogenic activities that can exacerbate the effects of extreme weather events. Urban planning often amplifies urban flooding impacts, especially in areas that are at increased risk of storms due to their location and climate variability. First, increasing the amount of impervious surfaces, such as sidewalks, roads, and roofs, means that less of the water from incoming storms is absorbed by the land. The destruction of wetlands, which act as a natural reservoir by absorbing water, can intensify the impact of floods and extreme precipitation. This can happen both inland and at the coast. However, wetland destruction along the coast can mean decreasing an area's natural 'cushion,' thus allowing storm surges and flood waters to reach farther inland during hurricanes or cyclones. Building homes below sea level or along a floodplain puts residents at increased risk of destruction or injury in an extreme precipitation event.

More urban areas can also contribute to the rise of extreme or unusual weather events. Tall structures can alter the way that wind moves throughout an urban area, pushing warmer air upwards and inducing convection, creating thunderstorms. With these thunderstorms comes increased precipitation, which, because of the large amounts of impervious surfaces in cities, can have devastating impacts. Impervious surfaces also absorb energy from the sun and warm the atmosphere, causing drastic increases in temperatures in urban areas. This, along with pollution and heat released from cars and other anthropogenic sources, contributes to urban heat islands.

== Effects ==
In recent decades, new high temperature records have substantially outpaced new low temperature records on a growing portion of Earth's surface.

The IPCC Sixth Assessment Report (2021) projects progressively large increases in both the frequency and intensity of extreme weather events, for increasing degrees of global warming.

Extreme weather can also have serious consequences for public health. Heat waves, floods, cyclones and wildfires can all result in an increased number of cases of illness and death as well as mental health effects. Such disasters can also increase the demand on hospitals, emergency responders and public health agencies in response and recovery efforts.

Extreme weather can also have an impact on ecosystems. Temperature extremes and precipitation extremes may affect the survival of species, the condition of their habitats and ecological processes. These effects may matter outside the natural environment because ecosystems can support agriculture, regulate water flows and help shield humans against certain types of hazards.

=== Economic cost ===
In the face of record breaking extreme weather events, climate change adaptation efforts fall short while economists are confronted with inflation, the cost-of-living crisis, and economic uncertainty. In 2011 the IPCC estimated, that annual losses have ranged since 1980 from a few billion to above US$200 billion, with the highest economic losses occurring in 2005, the year of Hurricane Katrina. The global weather-related disaster losses, such as loss of human lives, cultural heritage, and ecosystem services, are difficult to value and monetize, and thus they are poorly reflected in estimates of losses. A 2023 study estimated that, the costs of extreme weather caused by climate change totaled about US$2.86 trillion between the years 2000 - 2019; this equates to approximately US$143 billion in losses each year.

The World Economic Forum Global Risks Perception Survey 2023–2024 (GRPS) found that 66 percent of respondents selected extreme weather as top risk. The survey was conducted after the 2023 heat waves. According to the GRPS results, the perception of necessary short and long-term risk management varies. Younger respondents prioritize environmental risks, including extreme weather, in the short-term. Respondents working in the private sector prioritize environmental risks as long-term.

=== Casualties ===
The death toll from natural disasters has declined over 90 percent since the 1920s, according to the International Disaster Database, even as the total human population on Earth quadrupled, and temperatures rose 1.3 °C. In the 1920s, 5.4 million people died from natural disasters while in the 2010s, just 400,000 did.

The most dramatic and rapid declines in deaths from extreme weather events have taken place in south Asia. Where a tropical cyclone in 1991 in Bangladesh killed 135,000 people, and a 1970 cyclone killed 300,000, the similarly-sized Cyclone Ampham, which struck India and Bangladesh in 2020, killed just 120 people in total.

On July 23, 2020, Munich Re announced that the 2,900 total global deaths from natural disasters for the first half of 2020 were a record-low, and "much lower than the average figures for both the last 30 years and the last 10 years."

A 2021 study found that 9.4% of global deaths between 2000 and 2019, ~5 million annually, can be attributed to extreme temperatures, with cold-related deaths making up 8.5% and decreasing, and heat-related deaths making up 0.9% and increasing.

A 2023 study published in The Lancet Planetary Health estimates that extreme cold events contributed to over 130,000 excess deaths annually and extreme heat events contributed to over 13,000 excess deaths annually in European urban areas between 2000 and 2019.

=== Agriculture ===
Extreme weather events destroy crops through multiple mechanisms, including physical damage from hail, wind and flooding, as well as physiological stress from temperature extremes and moisture deficits. One global study of cereal production between 1964 and 2007 found that a drought and extreme heat lowered national cereal production by 10%. The study also found that a drought impacted both the harvested area yields while extreme head by itself only reduced yield. These primary impacts often trigger secondary effects such as increased pest and disease pressure in weakened plants, creating cascading consequences that extend beyond the initial damage. For instance, increased humidity resulting from flooding can create favorable conditions for fungal pathogens, while stressed plants may exhibit compromised immune responses. Livestock systems experience similar multifaceted impacts, including direct mortality from extreme weather, heat stress.

== See also ==
- Heat burst
- Lists of tornadoes and tornado outbreaks
- List of weather records
- Downburst
- Rogue wave
- Severe weather
  - List of severe weather phenomena
- Extreme weather events of 535–536
- Year Without a Summer
- Extreme event attribution

== Sources ==
This article incorporates text from a free content work. Licensed under CC BY 4.0 (license statement/permission). Text taken from The Impact of Disasters on Agriculture and Food Security 2025, The Food and Agriculture Organization of the United Nations.
