= Nature Reviews Earth & Environment =

- Discipline: Environmental science
- Language: English
- Edited by: Graham Simpkins

Publication details
- History: 2020–present
- Publisher: Nature Portfolio
- Frequency: Monthly
- Impact factor: 37.214 (2021)

Standard abbreviations
- ISO 4: Nat. Rev. Earth Environ.

Indexing
- CODEN: NREECQ
- ISSN: 2662-138X
- OCLC no.: 1137029201

Links
- Journal homepage; Online archive

Nature Reviews Earth & Environment is a monthly peer-reviewed scientific journal published by Nature Portfolio. It was established in 2020. The editor-in-chief is Graham Simpkins.

== Abstracting and indexing ==
The journal is abstracted and indexed in:

- Science Citation Index Expanded
- Scopus

According to the Journal Citation Reports, the journal has a 2021 impact factor of 37.214, ranking it 2nd out of 279 journals in the category "Environmental Sciences" and 1st out of 201 journals in the category "Geosciences, Multidisciplinary".
