= International Journal of Climatology =

- Discipline: Climatology
- Language: English
- Edited by: Enric Aguilar and William Collins

Publication details
- History: 1981–present
- Publisher: Wiley-Blackwell on behalf of the Royal Meteorological Society
- Frequency: 15/year
- Impact factor: 4.069 (2020)

Standard abbreviations
- ISO 4: Int. J. Climatol.

Indexing
- ISSN: 1097-0088

Links
- Journal homepage

The International Journal of Climatology is a peer-reviewed scientific journal publishing research in the field of climatology. Established in 1981, the journal is published 15 times per year by Wiley-Blackwell on behalf of the Royal Meteorological Society. The editor-in-chief are Enric Aguilar (Universitat Rovira) and William Collins (Lawrence Berkeley National Laboratory). According to the Journal Citation Reports, the journal has a 2020 impact factor of 4.069.
