= Extreme event attribution =

Field of study in meteorology and climate science

Since the industrial revolution, global warming has increased the frequency, intensity, duration and impacts of weather events—heatwaves, hurricane winds, etc.(red vs blue curve). Accordingly, the number of extreme events is substantially greater today (red area) than in the pre-industrial era (yellow area). The ratio of the red area to the yellow area is one expression of the increase in extreme events that is attributable to human-caused climate change.

In general, extreme event attribution, also known as attribution science, evaluates relative contributions of multiple causes of an event, and assigns statistical confidence to that evaluation. Most often, the term is applied to the science of identifying and quantifying the role that human-caused climate change plays in the frequency, intensity, duration, and impacts of individual extreme weather events. Attribution science aims to determine the degree to which such events can be explained by or linked to human-caused global warming, and are not simply due to random climate variability or natural weather patterns.

== History ==
Before the development of statistical methods enabling attribution science, the scientific consensus was that global climate trends could be attributed to human influence, but attribution of individual weather events was not thought possible. The Intergovernmental Panel on Climate Change (IPCC) first mentioned attribution in its 1990 First Assessment Report, saying "it is virtually impossible to demonstrate a cause-effect relationship with high confidence from studies of a single variable". However, the IPCC noted that confidence in attribution increases as climate predictions are borne out by observed data, referring to the "fingerprint method" that identifies indicators unique to human-caused global warming. The IPCC's 2001 Synthesis Report reported that "detection and attribution studies... consistently find evidence for an anthropogenic signal in the climate record of the last 35 to 50 years" and that "most of these studies find that, over the last 50 years, the estimated rate and magnitude of warming due to increasing greenhouse gases alone are comparable with, or larger than, the observed warming".

Fraction attributable risk (FAR)^{[p. xviii]} was first applied in a 2004 analysis of the 2003 European heatwave, providing a direct link between anthropogenic climate change and an individual extreme climate event.^{[p. 4]} Attribution science was described in a 2011 State of the Climate publication by the American Meteorological Society which concluded that human-caused climate change had a role in five of six extreme weather events studied. The greater computing power of the 2000s allowed weather to be simulated over and over again, and conceptual breakthroughs in the early to mid 2010s enabled attribution science. The American Meteorological Society stated in 2016 that "the science has now advanced to the point that we can detect the effects of climate change on some events with high confidence".

== Purpose ==
One way of judging which weather events are extreme involves selecting events that exceed a certain threshold of intensity (or frequency, or impact, etc.). This threshold might distinguish events lying above a certain percentile or beyond a certain number of standard deviations above average. Climate models then process the climate characteristics underlying the selected events for comparison to models of climates in which man-made climate drivers are excluded.

A key element of attribution science is framing: the careful posing of questions that science is better able to answer.^{[p. xviii]} For example, science can better answer "whether human influence increased the frequency or intensity of a particular event" than "whether humans caused this event".^{[p. xviii]} As of 2016, most attribution studies considered classes of events similar to a particular observed event, but other studies perform the more challenging task of estimating how much climate change affected a specific event's intensity or frequency.^{[p. 1]} Results of such studies allow scientists and journalists to make statements such as, "this weather event was made at least n times more likely by human-caused climate change" or "this heatwave was made m degrees hotter than it would have been in a world without global warming" or "this event was effectively impossible without climate change".

Climate Central explained that "attribution studies calculate whether, and by how much, climate change affected the intensity, frequency or impact of extremes" such as wildfires, droughts, rainfall, and typhoons. German climatologist Friederike Otto said that attribution science aims to answer the question, "did climate change play a role" in specific extreme events "within the news time frame – so within two weeks of the event".

A further function of attribution science is to assess the impact of extreme events on human vulnerabilities and society's ability to adapt. Attribution science gives people a more concrete description of what climate change means to their environment, provides scientific evidence to the public discourse, and enables targeted adaptation based on expected increases in specific types of extreme events. People, communities, and businesses can use a local-scale perspective to anticipate future extremes at their specific location.

== Methods ==
Extreme event attribution methods generally involve applying climate models to scenarios in both the "factual" (observed) world that is experiencing global warming, and a "counterfactual" (control) world that does not suffer human drivers of global warming. Differences between the results of the two processes—especially the frequency, intensity, duration, and impacts of extreme weather events—are then analyzed to arrive at the attribution result. Attribution to future extreme events can be estimated by applying climate models to scenarios of expected levels of future warming.

Climate Central's review of climate attribution studies covered almost 750 extreme weather events and trends, of various event types. The review found that climate change made almost all studied event types substantially more likely or more severe—with cold/snow/ice events being the exception. Different event types present different levels of complexity for modeling studies, resulting in different statistical uncertainties.

In what is regarded as a "breakthrough" paper (published in 2004), researchers compared simulations accounting for climate change with scenarios in which human-caused global warming did not exist. The breakthrough was not to ask whether climate change "caused" the event, but how much it might have affected the risk of it occurring at all. It's not a yes/no question.

Preliminarily, what constitutes an "extreme" event can be expressed in terms of percentile among observed historical events, of standard deviations about norms of previous events, of a likelihood of occurrence in a given time period (example: "1% chance per year"), or of expected frequencies (called a return period or recurrence interval, such as "100-year drought").

Event attribution approaches can be generally divided into two classes:^{[p. 3]} a first approach uses observational records to determine the change in probability or magnitude of events over time. A second approach uses model simulations to compare events in two worlds—a first "factual" world with human-caused greenhouse gas emissions and a second "counterfactual" world without such emissions—and attributing differences to human influence.

German climatologist Friederike Otto explained that attribution scientists use climate models to simulate what is possible under current climate conditions, and compute the likelihood of this particular event occurring given the forces affecting today's climate. Then, the preindustrial world is simulated by removing anthropogenic warming forces from the climate models or by performing statistical modeling on observations of the late 19th and early 20th century. Finally, differences in intensity or in frequency between the two simulations are deemed to be caused by climate change. Scientists use methods that have already been peer reviewed, allowing studies of new events to be published within a "news cycle" time frame.

Along similar lines, atmospheric scientist Xubin Zeng said that attribution studies generally proceed in four steps: (1) measuring the magnitude and frequency of a given event based on observed data, (2) running computer models to compare with and verify observation data, (3) running the same models on a baseline having no climate change, and (4) using statistics to compare and analyze the differences between the second and third steps.

Results from multiple attribution studies may differ from each other, based on differing definitions of what constitutes an "extreme" event, on the period of the historical record being analyzed, on the spatial resolution of the climate models, and so forth. Model outputs differ based on the event feature being analyzed (peak wind vs. average wind; rainfall amount vs. duration; etc.).

== Findings ==
Confidence in attributing different types of events: The ability to determine the influence of global warming on a specific extreme event (vertical axis) depends on the level of scientific knowledge about how global warming affects that type of event. This knowledge depends on the thoroughness of the records for each type of event, and on the quality of scientific models for simulating respective types of events.

Climate Central's November 2024 review of more than 600 climate attribution studies covered almost 750 extreme weather events and trends. The review found that climate change made 74% of events more likely or severe, and that about 9% were made less likely or severe. A study published in Nature concluded that the median of historical heatwaves during 2010–2019 were made about 200 times more likely.

Climate change was found to affect the intensity and frequency of extreme weather events differently: for example, the 2010 Russia heat wave was made far more likely but not more intense. Thus, some attribution studies simply "ask different questions" than other attribution studies.

Improved understanding of relevant drivers and their model representation—such as atmospheric dynamics, atmospheric and soil moisture, and surface cover—improves heatwave prediction and projection. Heatwaves are more accurately modeled than other extreme events because long-term temperature data is more reliable than other events' datasets. Rainfall is also relatively straightforward, but droughts, snowstorms, tropical storms and wildfires are more complicated.

== Applications and influence ==
Attribution science can inform choices about risk management and adaptation strategies as studied by insurers, government officials and policy makers, land and resource managers, zoning and infrastructure planners and engineers, litigators, and emergency managers.^{[p. 22]} For example, this science can guide decisions on whether to rebuild or to relocate after a certain extreme event^{[p. 1]}

Attribution science has been cited in climate change litigation against companies for causing, and governments for not addressing, climate change. Extreme event attribution (EEA) was applied to 213 historical heatwaves from 2000–2023, in order to attribute events to specific actors.

Specifically, "carbon majors" (fossil fuel and cement producers) were found to have enabled 16–53 heatwaves that would have been virtually impossible in a preindustrial climate. Even more specifically, a study published in Nature carried out an "end-to-end" attribution study linking fossil fuel producers to specific damages, concluding that Chevron Corporation very likely caused between US $791 billion and $3.6 trillion in heat-related losses from 1991 through 2020.

In late 2025, Copernicus Climate Change Service announced formation of a constantly operating attribution office aiming to provide two assessments a month, each within a week of an extreme weather event. The assessments can be used to help set government policy, assist insurance company risk assessments, and inform climate litigation.

== Examples ==
Climate Central applied a hurricane attribution framework from an Environmental Research: Climate paper to conclude that climate change's increase of water temperatures intensified peak wind speeds in all eleven 2024 Atlantic hurricanes.

In a one-year period (May 2024–), human-caused global warming increased the number of days of extreme heat events over long-term norms in virtually all countries and territories.

Human-caused climate change increased the probability of the 2024 Middle East heatwave by about a factor of 5 (center panel vs. left panel). Climate change attribution enables a projection that such heatwaves will double in frequency if global warming increases to 2.0 °C (right panel).

Attribution for the 2024 Philippines heatwave (middle panel) was about the same as for the 2024 Middle East heatwave (middle panel of other graphic). 2.0 °C global warming is forecast to increase such heatwaves in the Philippines more than in the Middle East (compare right panels).

Various organizations recognize attribution studies. The Sabin Center for Climate Change Law at Columbia University maintains searchable databases with categories: climate change attribution, extreme event attribution, impact attribution, source attribution, and attribution in the courts. Carbon Brief contains an interactive map including more than 600 studies covering almost 750 extreme weather events and trends. The American Meteorological Society publishes annual special collections, Explaining Extreme Events of [year] from a Climate Perspective.

Illustrative examples include:

- 2003 European heatwave: "it is very likely (confidence level >90%) that human influence has at least doubled the risk of a heatwave exceeding this threshold magnitude"
- 2004–2024 — intensified the ten deadliest extreme weather events during that time period, contributing to the deaths of at least 570,000 people
- October 2012 — Hurricane Sandy: flooded an area 27 square miles (70 km^{2}) larger
- August 2016 — Louisiana floods: 40% more likely
- February 2017 — US winter heat wave: three times more likely
- August 2017 — Hurricane Harvey: three times more likely and 15% more intense
- 2017–2018 Tasman Sea marine heatwave: overall intensity was "virtually impossible" without anthropogenic forcing
- 1950–2020: 25–38% reduction in global abundance of tropical birds attributed to human-caused intensification of heat extremes
- 2019–20 Australian bushfire season: at least 30% more likely, and heat extremes more likely by at least a factor of 2
- 2020 Siberia heatwave: >500 times as likely as similar events in 1900; or 600 times ("minimum") to 99,000 times ("best estimate")
- 2021 Western North America heat wave: 150 times more likely
- 2022 United Kingdom heatwave: return period of 100 years for 2-day average temperatures, and 1 in 1000 years for single-day maximum temperature over one region of the UK; made the overall event at least 10 times more likely
- 2022: Worldwide review of likelihood and intensity of heat extremes: tens of thousands of deaths directly attributable
- 2022: Review of rainfall events in North Atlantic basin: events, combined, attributed $500 billion in damages
- May 2023 through May 2024: days with extreme heat (with vs without global warming): Suriname (182 vs 24 days), Ecuador (180 vs 10 days), Guyana (174 vs 33 days), El Salvador (163 vs 15 days), Panama (149 vs 12 days)
- 2023 and 2024 (various heat events): probability ratios (PRs) in Marshall Islands and Micronesia (PR=35). Indonesia and Philippines (each 24 and 29). Central America (13). Spain and Portugal (8). Southern South America (7).
- 2000–2023: of 213 historical heatwaves considered, fossil fuel and cement producers enabled 16–53 heatwaves that would have been virtually impossible in a preindustrial climate.
- 2024: 44% of the loss in Florida of a Category 4 Hurricane Helene, and 45% of the loss in Florida of a Category 5 Hurricane Milton, are attributable to climate change. ClimaMeter analyses show that storms like Hurricane Helene and Hurricane Milton are up to 20% wetter in the present climate.
- 2026: The 2026 Chilean wildfires were made three times more likely (2.5x in Patagonia) by climate change.
- 2026: the 2026 European heatwaves resulted in an estimated 50,391 heat-related excess deaths across 854 European cities in the summer, with around two thirds attributable to anthropogenic climate change.

== See also ==
- Climate change mitigation
- Climate justice
- Economics of climate change
- Effects of climate change
- Media coverage of climate change
