= Arctic Report Card =

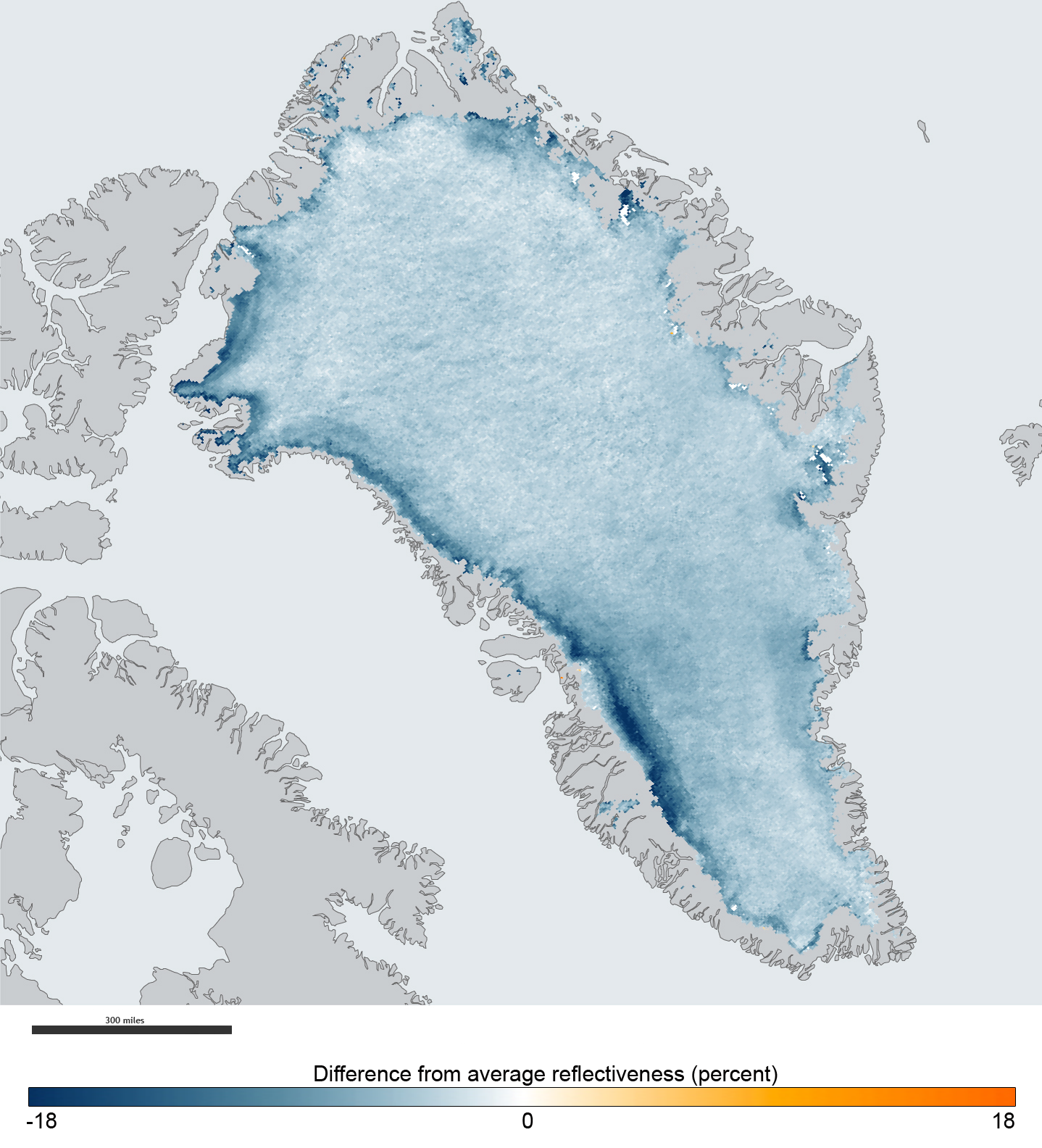
The map shows the difference between the amount of sunlight Greenland reflected in the summer of 2011 versus the average percent it reflected between 2000 and 2006. Virtually the entire ice sheet shows some change, with some areas reflecting close to 20 percent less light than a decade ago. The map is based on observations from the Moderate Resolution Imaging Spectroradiometer (MODIS) instruments on NASA's Terra and Aqua satellites.

The National Oceanic and Atmospheric Administration's Arctic Report Card presents annually updated, peer-reviewed information on recent observations of environmental conditions in the Arctic relative to historical records. The annual updates are released during a press conference at the December American Geophysical Union meeting. This annual report which measures the changes in climate can be used to predict the driving shifts in animal habitats and the local arctic ecosystem. The report categorised into three groups: Vital signs, Other Indicators and Frostbite.

Key highlights are featured on the current report card home page, previous report cards are available online, and each report card is summarized in a short YouTube video.

The audience for the Arctic Report Card is wide, including scientists, students, teachers, decision makers and the general public interested in Arctic environment and science.

The Arctic Report Card has reportedly been terminated by the Trump Administration in 2026.

== Indicators ==
The Arctic report card is categorised into three sections: Vital signs, other indicators and frostbites

The eight areas under ‘Vital signs‘, which are annually updated:

- Surface Air Temperature
- Precipitation
- Terrestrial Snow Cover
- Greenland Ice Sheet
- Sea Ice
- Sea Surface Temperature
- Arctic Ocean Primary Productivity
- Tundra Greenness

Frostbites reports on new and emerging issues, and topics that relate to long-term scientific observations in the Arctic.

Other indicators explores topics that are updated periodically.

== 2025 ==
The Arctic Report Card for 2025 contains 14 essays prepared by an international team of 112 researchers from 13 countries. A YouTube video summarizes the annual highlights. This year represented the 20th Anniversary of the Arctic Report Card.

== 2024 ==
The Arctic Report Card for 2024 contains 12 essays prepared by an international team of 97 researchers from 11 countries. A YouTube video summarizes the annual highlights.

== 2023 ==
The Arctic Report Card for 2023 contains 12 essays prepared by an international team of 82 researchers from 13 countries. A YouTube video summarizes the annual highlights.

== 2022 ==
The Arctic Report Card for 2022 contains 15 essays prepared by an international team of 147 researchers from 11 countries. A YouTube video summarizes the annual highlights.

== 2021 ==
The Arctic Report Card for 2021 contains 14 essays prepared by an international team of 111 researchers from 12 countries. A YouTube video summarizes the annual highlights.

== 2020 ==
The year 2020 marks the 15th anniversary of the Arctic Report Card. It was prepared by an international team of 134 researchers from 15 countries. A YouTube video summarizes the annual highlights.

== 2019 ==
The Arctic Report Card for 2019 has contributions from 81 researchers spread over 12 countries. For the first time, this year's report contains an essay by Indigenous Peoples from the Bering Sea region. A YouTube video summarizes the annual highlights.

The major findings were:

• The second warmest surface air temperature since 1900.

• The area of Arctic sea ice in summer 2019 was markedly reduced. It was reported the second lowest since satellite observations began in 1979. This has caused migration of Arctic fish to more northern waters.

• The highest recorded ice loss from Greenland Ice Sheet.

• Early snowmelt in Arctic of northwestern Canada and Alaska in March.Fifth lowest and third lowest North American Arctic snow cover in the month of May and June 2019 respectively.

== 2018 ==
The 2018 Arctic Report Card has contributions from 81 scientists, working for governments and academia, from 12 countries. A YouTube video summarizes the annual highlights.

== 2017 ==
The Arctic Report Card for 2017 has contributions from 85 authors spread over 12 countries. The 2017 report contains 12 essays, separated into three sections: Vital Signs, Other Indicators, and Frostbites. A YouTube video summarizes highlights for this Report Card.

== 2016 ==
The 2016 Arctic Report Card reflects the combined efforts of 61 authors from 11 countries. The 12 essays were subject to independent peer-review organized by the Arctic Monitoring and Assessment Programme (AMAP) of the Arctic Council.

In 2016, continuation of long term warming trends and sea ice loss are triggering extensive Arctic Changes. Key highlights are featured on the Home Page, which includes a YouTube video that summarizes the Report Card.

== 2015 ==
The Arctic Report Card reflected the combined efforts of 72 authors from 11 countries. The 12 essays were subject to independent peer-review organized by the Arctic Monitoring and Assessment Programme (AMAP) of the Arctic Council.

The 2015 Report Card essays are organized into 3 sections: Vital Signs; Indicators; and Frostbites. Key highlights are featured on the Home Page, which includes a YouTube video that summarizes the Report Card.

In 2015, Arctic sea extent at the end of the winter was the lowest during the satellite record and the winter maximum occurred 15 days earlier than in the past. The sea ice minimum at the end of summer was the 4th lowest extent on record. These changes are having profound impacts in both the marine and terrestrial ecosystems and in sea surface temperatures.
