= 2025 in Antarctica =

- Decades: 2000s; 2010s; 2020s
- See also: Other events of 2025; Timeline of Antarctic history

This is a list of events occurring in Antarctica in 2025.

== Ongoing Events ==
- Climate change in Antarctica
- Avian influenza subtype H5N1 outbreak in Antarctica

== January ==
- Early January – Chile's President Gabriel Boric visits the Amundsen-Scott South Pole Station, becoming the first leader in the Americas to visit the South Pole.
- Early January – At the Little Dome C site, the European Beyond EPICA project achieves a historic milestone by successfully drilling a 2800m-long ice core, consisting of ice which is more than 1.2 million years old.
- Early January – The Canadian patrol vessel HMCS Margaret Brooke departs Halifax on Operation PROJECTION 2025. This is the first-ever Antarctic visit by a Canadian military vessel. The mission is supporting a team of 15 Canadian climate scientists.
- 3 January – The Ukrainian icebreaker Noosfera arrives at the Vernadsky Research Base.
- 8 January – The French icebreaker L'Astrolabe leaves the Dumont d'Urville station and arrives in Hobart on January 13, completing its 3rd rotation of the season.
- 13 January – An iceberg named A-84 breaks away from the George VI Ice Shelf. The team aboard Schmidt Ocean Institute’s R/V Falkor (too) working in the Bellingshausen Sea changes their research plans to study the newly exposed seafloor and arrives on site on January 25.
- 14 January – New Zealand's vessel RV Tangaroa leaves Wellington for the expedition TAN2502 to the Ross Sea, the ship's 16th voyage to Antarctica and Southern Ocean.
- 19 January – Personnel from the Henryk Arctowski Polish Antarctic Station discover the remains of Dennis Bell, a 25-year-old British meteorologist who died in a glacier crevasse on King George Island on 26 July 1959. The remains are later carried to the Falkland Islands aboard RRS Sir David Attenborough and then transported to London.
- 25 January – The crew of the Schmidt Ocean Institute’s RV Falkor Too films the first confirmed footage of the glacial glass squid (Galiteuthis glacialis). The observation is made at 687 meters in the Bellingshausen Sea.
- Schmidt Ocean Institute’s RV Falkor (too) completes its first science expedition to Antarctica.
- Late January – The Ukrainian icebreaker Noosfera is operating in the Southern Ocean around the American Palmer Station with U.S. researchers on board, supporting marine research on behalf of the U.S. National Science Foundation.
- Late January – Two Czech research expeditions reach Antarctica. One team of six people arrives at the Eco-Nelson station on Nelson island and another of fourteen people arrives at the Mendel Polar Station on James Ross Island. They later confirm the presence of avian influenza in dead birds (Stercorarius maccormicki) near the Mendel station.
- Late January – A Brazilian Antarctic circumnavigation expedition ends in January 2025 after covering 29,000 km since November 2024.

== February ==
- Early February – Researchers on board the Spanish oceanographic ship RV Sarmiento de Gamboa observe massive columns of methane emerging from the Antarctic seabed. The CSIC vessel is cruising the Antarctic seas for almost a month and its mission ends on February 7.
- 6 February – The French icebreaker L'Astrolabe returns to Hobart after its 4th rotation of the season.
- 13 February
  - A new map of South Orkney Islands published by the British Antarctic Survey (BAS) for the first time in 40 years.
  - A 60-year-old man suffers a heart attack at McMurdo Station. He is saved by first responders from the U.S. Air National Guard, McMurdo's fire department, and the National Science Foundation and later evacuated to Christchurch, New Zealand using a U.S. Air Force LC-130 aircraft of the New York Air National Guard's 109th Airlift Wing. This unit carries out nine medical evacuations during its Antarctica support season from October 2024 to February 2025.
- 15 February – An expedition of University of Cape Town scientists from the Polar Engineering Research Group (PERG) return to South Africa after studying the Fimbul Ice Shelf since December 2024.
- 17 February– The South African S. A. Agulhas II returns to Cape Town following its annual supply and relief voyage to the SANAE IV base.
- 20 February – New Zealand's vessel RV Tangaroa returns to Wellington after the expedition TAN2502 to the Ross Sea.
- 27 February – Researchers at the South African Sanae IV station report a violent incident among the crew.
- Late February – Scientific expedition led by the Spanish CSIC aboard the Antarctic sailing vessel Australis confirms the presence of the avian influenza virus (HPAI H5N1) on islands in the Weddell Sea. The positive samples came from nine bird (mostly skuas) and four seal species.
- Late February – The U.S. 109th Airlift Wing concluds the 2024-25 Antarctic science support season using its ski-equipped LC-130 Hercules aircraft.
- Late February – Japan's icebreaker Shirase makes a port call at Fremantle Harbour, Australia to reload supplies and replace personnel between its missions to Antarctica. On February 26, the vessel departs for Antarctica again.
- February – New scientific laboratory building at the Bulgarian Antarctic Base on Livingston Island, designed by architect Penka Stancheva, inaugurated in February.

== March ==
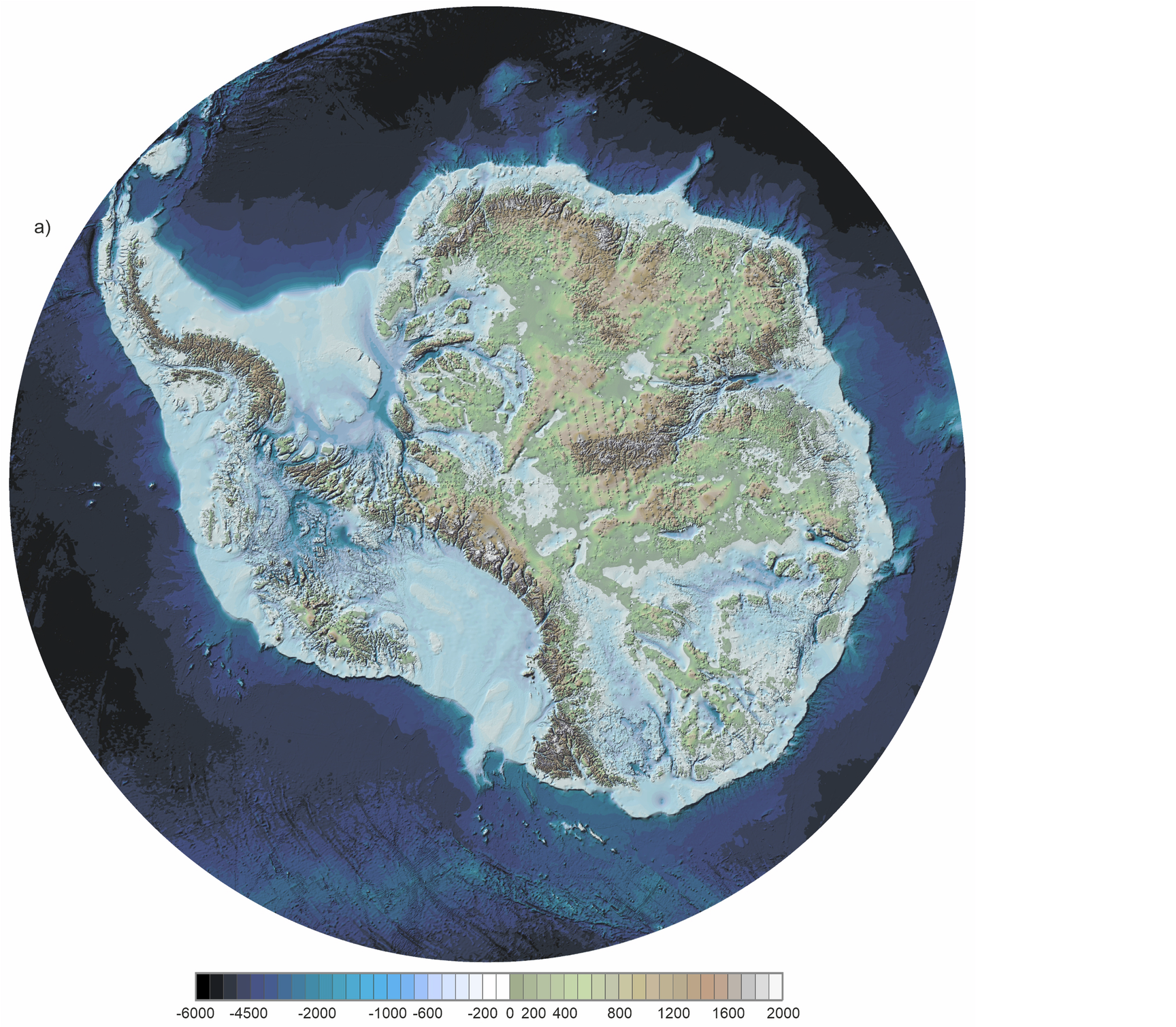
Bedmap3: a fine grained map of Antarctica beneath the ice, published in 2025

- Early March – The giant iceberg A23a runs aground near South Georgia.
- Australia's icebreaker, RSV Nuyina leaves Hobart, heading to Antarctica on its first dedicated marine science mission, the "Denman Marine Voyage"
- Early March – The British Antarctic Survey (BAS) installs and activates two solar photovoltaic and energy storage systems on Bird Island research station and at Sky Blu runway in Eastern Ellsworth land.
- 1 March
  - The Canadian patrol vessel HMCS Margaret Brooke reaches Antarctica and stoppes by Deception Island.
  - The Italian icebreaker RV Laura Bassi returns to the port of Lyttelton in New Zealand, concluding the 40th scientific expedition to Antarctica as part of the National Programme for Research in Antarctica (PNRA).
  - The U.S. Coast Guard icebreaker Polar Star departs Antarctica after the annual research and resupply mission Operation Deep Freeze 2025.
- 9 March – The crew of the Schmidt Ocean Institute’s RV Falkor Too are the first to film the colossal squid (Mesonychoteuthis hamiltoni) in its natural environment. The observation is made using the ROV SuBastian at a depth of 600 meters near the South Sandwich Islands.
- 10 March – The most detailed map yet of the landscape beneath Antarctica's ice sheet, known as Bedmap3, published by a team led from the British Antarctic Survey (BAS) in the journal Scientific Data.
- 14 March – The Argentine Navy icebreaker ARA Bahia Agradable rescues the Chilean supply vessel Betanzos that has lost power off Livingston Island.
- 15 March – The Ukrainian icebreaker Noosfera arrives at the Vernadsky Research Base, delivering the 30th Ukrainian Antarctic Expedition.
- 16 March
  - The first game of Gaelic football to ever be played on Antarctica takes place at the BAS Rothera Research Station on St Patrick's weekend.
  - The Australian icebreaker RSV Nuyina arrives near the Denman Glacier and during the following week the researchers focus on a CTD transect across the front of the Denman Glacier tongue.
- 19 March – The 1.2-million-years-old Beyond EPICA ice samples leave Antarctica aboard the Italian icebreaker RV Laura Bassi.
- 20 March – The Ukrainian icebreaker Noosfera deploys six oceanographic Argo buoys into Antarctic waters, the first such operation for Ukraine.
- 21 March – China's 41st Antarctic expedition team sets sail from New Zealand's Lyttelton Harbor for the Ross Sea aboard the icebreaker Xue Long 2.
- 23 March – The Ukrainian icebreaker Noosfera leaves Antarctica for Punta Arenas, Chile with the departing crew of the 29th Ukrainian Antarctic Expedition and a seasonal crew on board.
- Late March – The snow coach Ivan the Terra Bus decommissioned after 30 years of service at the McMurdo Station, and in March 2025, it is shipped to Christchurch, New Zealand.
- Late March – The 11th Antarctic expedition of Colombia, counting 34 researchers from seven institutions, concludes after three months of research on the Antarctic Peninsula.
- Late March – NASA and NSIDC reports that in 2025, summer sea ice extent around Antarctica tied for the 2nd-lowest minimum ever recorded in the 47-year record of satellite measurements.
- Late March – A rare all-black melanistic gentoo penguin chick spotted on Rongé Island.
- Late March – The MODIS instrument on NASA's Terra satellite observes new sea ice forming, as well as surviving multi-year ice, near the fronts of Pine Island and Thwaites glaciers in the Amundsen sea. Sea ice in this area is unusually persistent this year.

== April ==
- 3 April – Researchers aboard the RSV Nuyina report on their collection of marine invertebrates in the vicinity of the Denman Glacier, including a pteropod which subsequently lays eggs, allowing the first direct observation of pteropod egg development.
- 11 April – The 33rd Bulgarian Antarctic Expedition concludes when the naval research vessel Sv. Sv. Kiril i Metodii RSV 421 arrives in Varna after its third 5-month mission to the Southern Ocean and Antarctica.
- 15 April – Daily Maverick reports on the growing danger of overfishing of Antarctic krill.
- Late April – A rare 'pack ice' killer whale (Type B1) filmed by researchers aboard the Antarctic sailing vessel Australis near the Antarctic Peninsula.
- Late April – Researchers of the 30th Ukrainian Antarctic Expedition report a rare observation of a vagrant western cattle egret near the Vernadsky Research Base.

== May ==
- 1 May – New Zealand announces a renewal of Government investment to extend the Antarctic Science Platform's research into Climate Change in Antarctica for another seven years.
- 2 May – There is a magnitude 7.4 earthquake in the Drake Passage at 9 am local time. Chilean authorities mandate the evacuation of coastal areas in the Magallanes region and the Chilean Antarctic Territory due to tsunami threats but cancel the evacuation orders later in the afternoon after no serious damage to infrastructure or harm to people are reported.
- 3 May – The MODIS instrument on NASA's Aqua satellite captures an image of the A-23a iceberg that has remained at a standstill less than 100 kilometers off South Georgia since early March 2025. The new image shows that the iceberg's surface area has declined substantially in preceding two months. It has lost more than 360 square kilometers between 6 March and 3 May and its northern side is showing signs of edge wasting, a type of iceberg breakup where small pieces calve from many places along its edge.
- 9 May
  - The Canadian Arctic and offshore patrol vessel HMCS Margaret Brooke arrives back in Halifax after completing its four-month mission to Antarctica.
  - The Denman Marine Voyage concludes when the Australian icebreaker RSV Nuyina returns to Hobart after spending two months near the Shackleton Ice Shelf. This was the vessel's first dedicated marine science voyage.
- 14 May – Newsweek reports that the UK House of Commons Environment Audit Committee discussed evidence that Russia has discovered large oil deposits of around 511 billion barrels in the Weddell Sea, which falls under the UK's Antarctic territory.
- Late May – The Arête Glacier Initiative is launched. This is a non-profit research organization aimed at coordinating and funding projects for better forecast and mitigation of sea-level rise caused by ice loss, especially focused on the Thwaites Glacier in West Antarctica.
- Late May – The Australian Antarctic Division (AAD) signs an agreement with an industry consortium to upgrade Davis research station. The works will start in November 2026 with the installation of a reverse osmosis plant and later continue with the construction of a new utilities building including the main powerhouse and various workshops.

== June ==
- 20 June – Midwinter Day celebrated.
- 28 June – American pilot and social media influencer Ethan Guo detained by Chilean authorities after landing without authorization at Lieutenant Rodolfo Marsh Base on King George Island.

== July ==
- Early July – Initial analyses at the Alfred Wegener Institute confirms that the ice samples drilled during the Beyond EPICA - Oldest Ice (BEOI) project, and transported to Europe earlier this year, are more than 1.2 million years old.
- Mid-July – Six Australian expeditioners travel 90 km across the sea ice from Mawson station to Colbeck Hut to conduct the annual population census of the Taylor Glacier emperor penguin colony and to collect images captured by automated cameras monitoring the colony.
- Late July – A 14 km iceberg, which calved from the Nansen Ice Shelf in March 2025, grounds against Coulman Island, blocking a migration route of a large colony of emperor penguins, causing a catastrophic die-off of chicks with a 70% survival drop.

== August ==
- 6 August – The New Zealand air force evacuates three people from McMurdo Station using a C-130J Hercules. The evacuation was requested by the U.S. National Science Foundation for medical reasons.
- 22 August – A magnitude 7.5 earthquake occurs in the Drake Passage with no tsunami threat reported.

== September ==
- 2 September – Satellite observations by the European system Copernicus reveal that the A23a iceberg, now north of South Georgia, is half of its size from the beginning of 2025 and is breaking up dramatically.
- 7 September – Ethan Guo, who has been stuck at the Chilean Lieutenant Rodolfo Marsh base on King George Island for two months after landing a plane there without permission, is released and on 6 September, he arrives in Punta Arenas aboard a navy ship.
- 10 September – NSIDC reports that this year's Antarctic sea ice extent has already surpassed the annual maximum for the two lowest years on record (2023 and 2024), but it is still tracking at third lowest.
- 11 September – The MODIS instrument on NASA's Terra satellite documents the ongoing disintegration of the A23a iceberg. The iceberg spans just over 1,500 km^{2} and two large fragments (A23g and A23i) are visible south of it.
- 17 September – Antarctic sea ice extent reaches its annual maximum of 17.81 million km^{2}, marking the third lowest maximum in the 47-year satellite record.
- 19 September – Using a decade of radar altimetry data from the European Space Agency's CryoSat-2 satellite, scientists identify 85 new subglacial lakes in Antarctica. The findings are published in Nature Communications.
- 27 September – The Australian icebreaker RSV Nuyina leaves Tasmania for a 52-day research and resupply voyage to Antarctica with 99 expeditioners on board, among them Jenny Bonser, the new leader of Davis research station.
- September – A Sudden Stratospheric Warming (SSW) event occurs, rising the temperatures by more than 30 °C above Antarctica.

== October ==
- 1 October – At 00:47 UTC, a meter-sized near-Earth asteroid 2025 TF flies about 428 ± 7 km above the surface over Antarctica. This is the second-closest asteroid flyby of the Earth ever recorded.
- 2 October – The first-ever direct air cargo mission from India to Antarctica takes place. The DROMLAN's IL-76 aircraft transports 18 tons of National Centre for Polar and Ocean Research (NCPOR) supplies from Goa to India's Bharati and Maitri research bases.
- 3 October – Researchers at the British Antarctic Survey (BAS) in Cambridge finish the melting process of the 190 m-long ice sample from the bottom of a 2800 m ice core retrieved from Little Dome C in East Antarctica during the Beyond EPICA – Oldest Ice project. This reveals an unbroken sequence of climate cycles stretching back at least 1.2 million years–the oldest continuous ice core ever recovered.
- 6 October
  - The fleet of British Antarctic Survey (BAS) aircraft takes off on their annual ferry flights from Canada to the UK's Rothera Research Station on the Antarctic Peninsula.
  - The Italian icebreaker RV Laura Bassi departs from Trieste for a long route to Antarctica by way of the Panama Canal and New Zealand.
- 10 October – Two helicopters transport cargo and 14 people from the Australian icebreaker RSV Nuyina to Casey station. The operation takes seven flights, each one a two-hour round trip. The ship is approximately 100 nautical miles from the station.
- 14 October – The Australian Antarctic Program officially opens its recruitment campaign for the 2026/27 season, seeking about 300 workers for almost 40 different roles.
- 17 October
  - The Ukrainian research icebreaker Noosfera departs for Antarctica from Cape Town, launching its fifth Antarctic season.
  - The UK's RRS Sir David Attenborough departs Plymouth for a five-week voyage to Antarctica. The ship makes the journey using hydrotreated vegetable oil, a biofuel intended to reduce the carbon footprint of the operations.
- 17 October – The Australian icebreaker RSV Nuyina arrives at Heard Island. During the visit, the icebreaker's hull scrapes the ocean floor, suffering superficial damage. No-one on the ship is injured. During the following week, the ship's project groups explore the island, surveying its seabird and seal population with drone flights and in situ visits, searching for unusual levels of H5 bird flu-related mortality (found in elephant seals but no other species on the island), mapping the seafloor and investigating marine life around Atlas Cove from inflatable boats, and assessing the state of the old station at Atlas Cove. The crews also install sea level-monitoring equipment at Magnet Point and transport eight "top hat reflectors"–ground markers for satellites–to the island for future installation.
- 21 October – A Royal Australian Air Force C-17A Globemaster III airdrops 600 kg of ice core drilling supplies to Casey station in preparation for the Million Year Ice Core (MYIC) project summer season. In total, the aircraft drops approximately 12 tonnes of equipment to the station as part of Operation Southern Discovery 2025–26. This year marks the 10th anniversary of Australian Defence Force's support to Antarctic operations.
- 29 October – The "Under Antarctica" expedition begins when glaciologist Heidi Sevestre and explorer Matthieu Tordeur fly from Cape Town to Novolazarevskaya station. They aim to complete a 4,000-km journey in around 90 days using kite skis, while mapping the depth and age of ice with ground-penetrating radar on sleds.
- Late October – The Australian icebreaker RSV Nuyina arrives at Davis station to bring 500 tonnes of supplies.
- October – The 41st Italian Antarctic Research Expedition begins with the first group of technicians arriving in Antarctica and reopening Mario Zucchelli Station, closed since previous February.

== November ==
- 1 November
  - China's 42nd Antarctic expedition leaves from Shanghai. The expedition plans to conduct the first Chinese scientific drilling into Antarctic subglacial lakes.
  - Australian tractor-traverse team led by Damien Beloin leaves Casey station for a 15–18 days of travel across 1,168 km to the drilling site of the Million Year Ice Core (MYIC) project at Dome C North. The team is using 6 tractors and 20 sleds to haul 493 tonnes of scientific equipment, fuel, and food to the drilling site.
- 3 November – The "Under Antarctica" expeditioners cover their first kilometers snowkiting after driving from Novolazarevskaya station across Queen Maud Land to Thor's Hammer at the edge of the Antarctic plateau.
- 4 November
  - The Ukrainian research icebreaker Noosfera arrives at Poland's Arctowski Antarctic station.
  - The 79th ANARE (Australian National Antarctic Research Expedition) officially takes over Davis research station with a flag raising ceremony and handing of the station key from outgoing station leader, Nic Bye, to incoming leader Jenny Bonser. Then, RSV Nuyina departs the station with members of the 78th ANARE on board. A twin otter plane also brings two people who have been wintering at Mawson research station to join the vessel for the journey back to Australia.
- 6 November – The first group of the 34th Bulgarian Antarctic Expedition (nine logisticians and two scientists) departs by plane from Sofia to Punta Arenas.
- 7 November – The Bulgarian research vessel Sv. Sv. Kiril i Metodii departs from Varna on its 4th voyage to Antarctica with Bulgaria's 34th Antarctic expedition. The ship is expected to reach the St. Kliment Ohridski Base on Livingston Island by the end of December 2025.
- 8 November – Colin O'Brady arrives at Union Glacier in Antarctica before embark on a 110-day, 1,780-mile (2,865 km) solo crossing of the Ross Ice Shelf.
- 11 November – The French icebreaker L'Astrolabe departs Hobart for Dumont d'Urville station.
- Mid-November – ESA-sponsored physician Nina Purvis completes her 13-months research stay Concordia station and leaves the continent via Mario Zuchelli station. There she meets Sarah Gaier, who is taking over her role. Later, Sarah Gaier safely arrives at Concordia. ESA reports on this exchange on 12 November.
- 12 November – The first 14 team members of the BELARE 2025-26 team arrives at the Belgian Princess Elisabeth Antarctica Research Station to open the station after it spent eight months uninhabited and controlled remotely.
- 14 November – Governor-General of New Zealand Cindy Kiro visits Scott Base, becoming the first NZ Governor-General to visit Antarctica since 2003.
- 25 November – CSIRO's Australian Centre for Disease Preparedness confirms the presence of the H5 bird flu virus in samples from dead elephant seals collected in October 2025 on Heard Island.
- 26 November – The fifth and final drilling campaign of the Beyond EPICA – Oldest Ice project begins.

== December ==
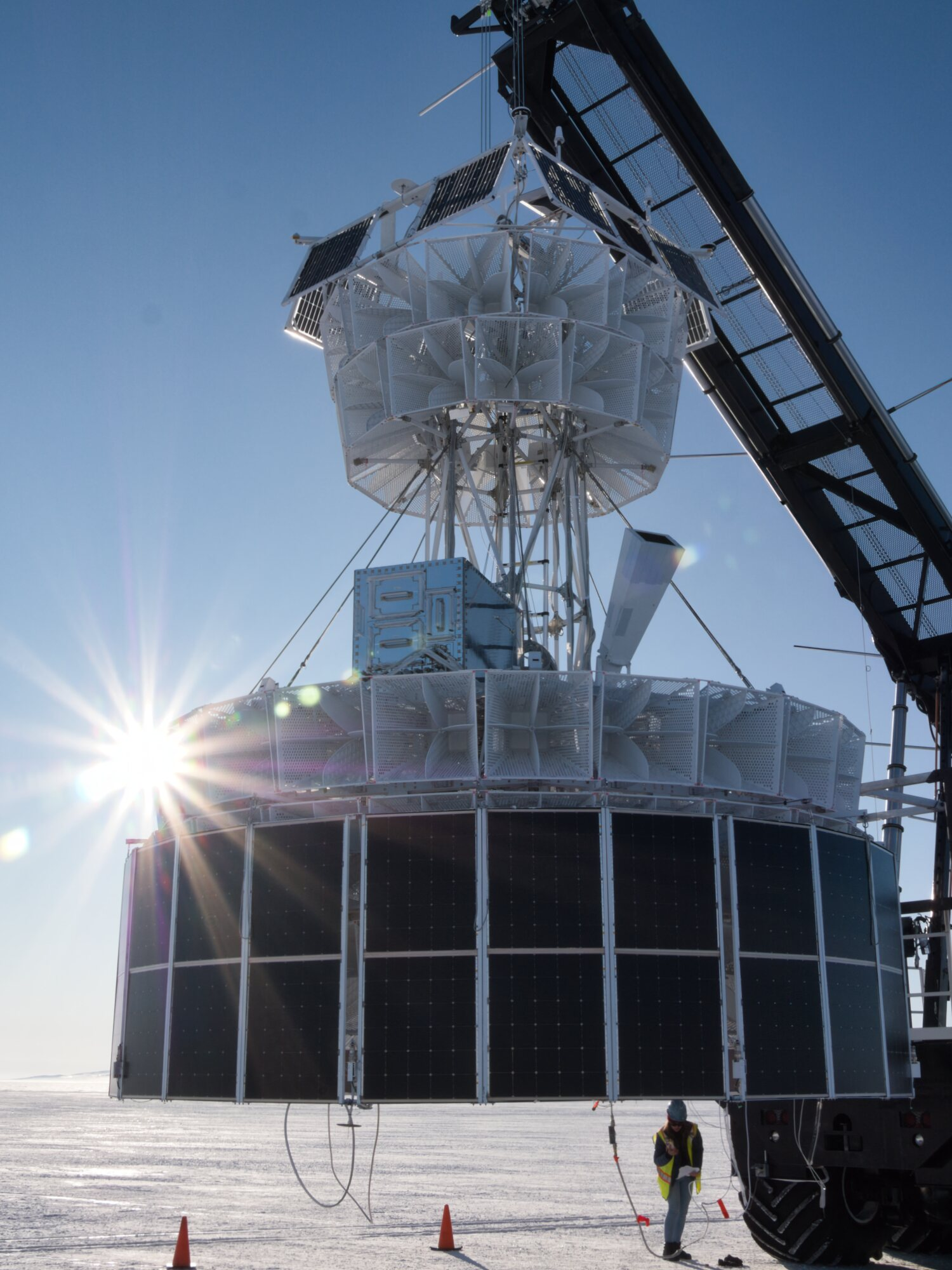
NASA's Payload for Ultrahigh Energy Observations (PUEO)

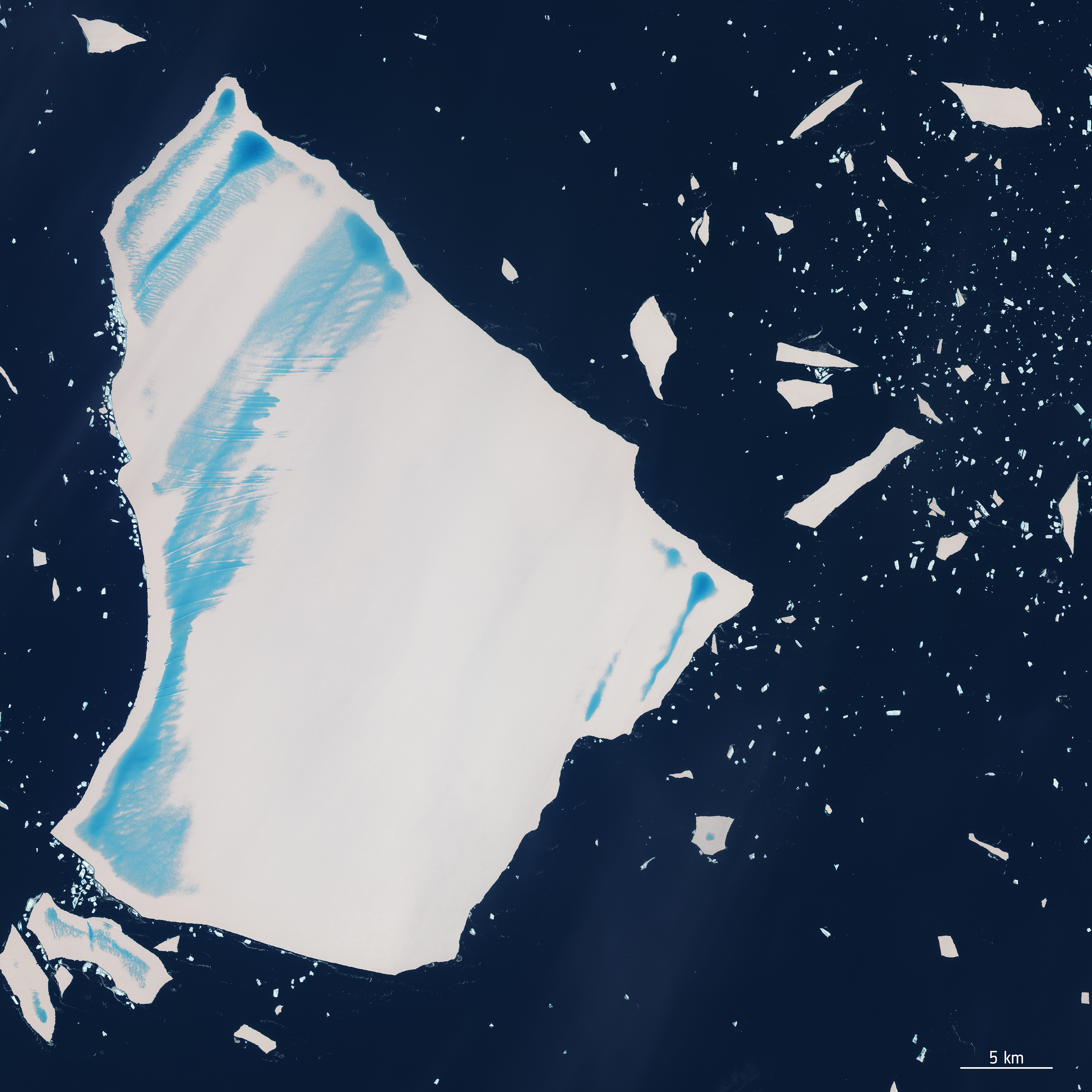
Copernicus Sentinel-2 image of the A23a iceberg

- Early December – The Australian icebreaker RSV Nuyina leaves Australia for its second voyage to Antarctica this season to resupply Casey research station and again visit Heard island, this time on a 25-day science and environmental management visit (V2).
- Early December – Earth Sciences New Zealand deploys an Atmospheric Emitted Radiance Interferometer (AERI) in Antarctica to observe atmospheric infrared radiation over the following 12 months in conjunction with NASA's PREFIRE mission.
- Early December – A 29-strong international team sets up a remote camp on the ice 700 km from the nearest base (Scott Base) on the West Antarctic Ice Sheet for the third season of the SWAIS2C (Sensitivity of the West Antarctic Ice Sheet to 2°C) ice drilling project.
- 1 December – Antarctica Day celebrated.
- 3 December – The U.S. Coast Guard heavy icebreaker USCGC Polar Star arrives in Hawaii on its way to its 29th deployment to Antarctica.
- 12 December – The German research vessel Polarstern docks in Walvis Bay, Namibia, on its way from Bremerhaven to Antarctica.
- 14 December – The "Under Antarctica" expeditioners reach the site of the abandoned Soviet Pole of Inaccessibility research station.
- 15 December – The German research vessel Polarstern departs Walvis Bay, Namibia, beginning its "Weddell Sea Observatory of Biodiversity and Ecosystem Change" (WOBEC) expedition.
- 16 December
  - NASA's General AntiParticle Spectrometer (GAPS) balloon-borne experiment launched from McMurdo Station.
  - The second group of the 34th Bulgarian Antarctic Expedition departs by plane from Sofia.
- 17 December – The Italian icebreaker RV Laura Bassi arrives at Mario Zucchelli Station in Antarctica after an eight-day voyage from Lyttelton, as part of Italy's 41st Antarctic Research Expedition, focused on climatology and oceanography in the Ross Sea.
- 19 December – Seven new crew members and three scientists arrive by plane at the Belgian Princess Elisabeth Antarctica Research Station to start their mission in Antarctica.
- 20 December
  - NASA's Payload for Ultrahigh Energy Observations (PUEO) balloon-borne experiment launched from McMurdo Station.
  - The European satellite mission Sentinel 2 captures an image of the disintegrating iceberg A23a showing pools of blue meltwater forming on its surface.
- 21 December – The Bulgarian research vessel Sv. Sv. Kiril i Metodii docks at Punta Arenas on its way to Livingston Island.
- 22 December
  - The SWAIS2C team starts hot water drilling at their remote camp on the West Antarctic Ice Sheet.
  - Uruguay's Artigas Antarctic Research Station (BCAA) on King George Island celebrates its 41st anniversary.
- 26 December
  - The Bulgarian research vessel Sv. Sv. Kiril i Metodii arrives at St. Kliment Ohridski Base, marking the start of the active phase of Bulgaria's 34th Antarctic expedition.
  - NASA's Terra satellite captures an image of the disintegrating iceberg A23a showing extensive pools of blue meltwater covering most of its surface.
- 27 December
  - The South Korean icebreaker RV Araon departs New Zealand on an eight weeks long research expedition to Thwaites Glacier.
  - The Japanese icebreaker Shirase berths 1,700 m off Showa Station on East Ongul Island. This is several times further than on previous visits because the usual approach route is blocked by broken sea ice. The icebreaker then transfers equipment, fuel, food, and other supplies to the station.
- 29 December – The Chinese icebreaker Xuelong arrives near Qinling Station to begin unloading cargo as part of China's 42nd Antarctic expedition.
- 30 December – The Cabinet of Ministers of Ukraine decides to extend the state program of research in the Antarctic for another two years, until the end of 2027.

== See also ==
- Southern Ocean
- South Pole
- Antarctic ice sheet
- 2025 in science
- 2025 in spaceflight
- 2025 in climate change
- 2025 in the environment
