= 2023 in Antarctica =

- Decades: 2000s; 2010s; 2020s
- See also: Other events of 2023; Timeline of Antarctic history

This is a list of events occurring in Antarctica in 2023.

== Events ==
Ongoing: COVID-19 pandemic in Antarctica

- 15 February — A joint study by the British Antarctic Survey and the US Antarctic programme finds that glaciers on the icy continent may be more sensitive to changes in sea temperature than previously thought. Researchers used sensors and an underwater robot beneath the Thwaites Glacier to study melting.
- 16 February — The National Snow and Ice Data Center of the United States reports that the Antarctic sea ice decreased to 1.91 million square kilometers (740,000 sq mi) within the week, the smallest since records began in 1979.
- 27 November — The British Antarctic Survey confirms that the world's largest iceberg, A23a, is now leaving the Weddell Sea and drifting into the Southern Ocean after being in the Weddell Sea for more than 30 years. The iceberg is expected to follow the Antarctic Circumpolar Current and continue to drift away from Antarctica.
