= 2020 in Antarctica =

- Decades: 2000s; 2010s; 2020s
- See also: Other events of 2020; Timeline of Antarctic history

The following events occurred in Antarctica in 2020.

== Events ==
- 19 June – The first fossil egg from Antarctica is discovered. It is the largest soft-shelled egg found to date.
- 7 July – The puzzle of why rising carbon dioxide levels slowed for centuries as Earth warmed from the last ice age is solved by small amounts of marine life found in an ancient Antarctic ice sheet.
- 21 December – Antarctica becomes the last continent to be affected by the COVID-19 pandemic when at least 36 people are confirmed as positive at the Chilean Base General Bernardo O'Higgins Riquelme.
