= 2021 in Antarctica =

- Decades: 2000s; 2010s; 2020s
- See also: Other events of 2021; Timeline of Antarctic history

The following events occurred in Antarctica in 2021.

== Events ==
Ongoing: COVID-19 pandemic in Antarctica

- February — Researchers deployed robotic gliders from the RRS James Cook, 23 km from the iceberg A-68a. Results of their measurements were published in 2025, revealing the impact of meltwater on the surrounding ocean.
- 18 March — The Chilean Air Force announces that part of its staff in Antarctica has been vaccinated against COVID-19, making them the first people on the continent to receive a vaccine.
- 19 May — A tabular iceberg slightly larger than the size of Mallorca, dubbed A-76, calves from the Ronne Ice Shelf in Antarctica's Weddell Sea.
- 1 July — The United Nations' World Meteorological Organization confirms that a record high temperature of 18.3 °C (64.9 °F) has been recorded in Antarctica at the Esperanza Base.
