= 2022 in Antarctica =

- Decades: 2000s; 2010s; 2020s
- See also: Other events of 2022; Timeline of Antarctic history

The following events occurred in Antarctica in 2022.

== Events ==
Ongoing: COVID-19 pandemic in Antarctica

- 5 January — A Belgian scientific research station that was hit with a COVID-19 outbreak last month have since fully recovered.
- 6 September — Scientists operating robotic submarines announce that the Thwaites Glacier may separate sooner than expected, with sea levels expected to rise by several meters.
- 17 October – A cyclone in the Bellingshausen Sea becomes the most intense extratropical cyclone on record, with the minimum pressure of the cyclone being estimated at around 900 mbar (27 inHg).
