= 2025 TF =

Near-Earth asteroid

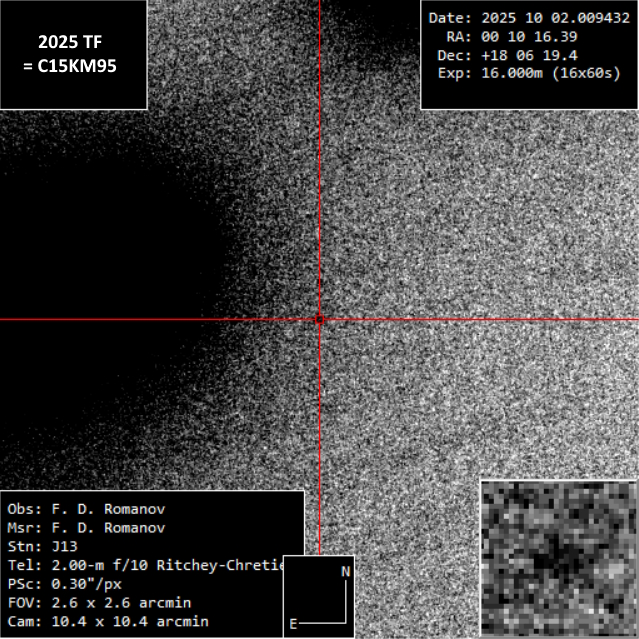
- Asteroid 2025 TF imaged on 2 October 2025 by the Liverpool Telescope

Discovery
- Discovered by: Kitt Peak National Obs.
- Discovery site: Kitt Peak National Obs.
- Discovery date: 1 October 2025

Designations
- Alternative designations: C15KM95
- Minor planet category: NEO · Apollo

Orbital characteristics
- Epoch 21 November 2025 (JD 2461000.5)
- Uncertainty parameter 7
- Observation arc: 20.8 hr (0.87 days)
- Aphelion: 2.559 AU
- Perihelion: 0.676 AU
- Semi-major axis: 1.618 AU
- Eccentricity: 0.5820
- Orbital period (sidereal): 2.06 yr (751 days)
- Mean anomaly: 48.316 °
- Mean motion: 0° 28^{m} 44.571^{s} / day
- Inclination: 9.119°
- Longitude of ascending node: 7.769°
- Time of perihelion: 12 August 2025
- Argument of perihelion: 276.726°
- Earth MOID: 6.05031×10^{−5} AU (9.05 thousand km; 0.0235 LD)
- Jupiter MOID: 2.682 AU
- T_{Jupiter}: 4.112

Physical characteristics
- Mean diameter: 1.2–2.7 m
- Absolute magnitude (H): 31.70±0.45

2025 TF is a meter-sized near-Earth asteroid that passed 409 ± 14 km (254 ± 9 mi) over the surface of Earth's South Pole (Antarctica) on 1 October 2025 00:49 UTC, at a relative speed of 20.9 km/s (13.0 mi/s). (Note: Closest approach altitude is calculated by using JPL's geocentric approach distance of 6780±14 km and subtracting by Earth's radius (6371 km).) It is the third-closest asteroid flyby of Earth recorded as of 2025, after 2025 UC11 and 2020 VT4. 2025 TF was discovered on 1 October 2025 06:36 UTC by astronomers using the Bok Telescope at Kitt Peak National Observatory in Arizona, less than 6 hours after the asteroid's closest approach to Earth.

== See also ==
- 1972 Great Daylight Fireball – an Earth-grazing fireball that resulted from a small asteroid passing through Earth's atmosphere
- 2025 in Antarctica
