= Taylor–Proudman theorem =

Fluid mechanics concept

In fluid mechanics, the Taylor–Proudman theorem (after Geoffrey Ingram Taylor and Joseph Proudman) states that when a solid body is moved slowly within a fluid that is steadily rotated with a high angular velocity $\Omega$, the fluid velocity will be uniform along any line parallel to the axis of rotation. $\Omega$ must be large compared to the movement of the solid body in order to make the Coriolis force large compared to the acceleration terms.

== Derivation ==
The Navier–Stokes equations for steady flow, with zero viscosity and a body force corresponding to the Coriolis force, are

$$\rho({\mathbf u}\cdot\nabla){\mathbf u}={\mathbf F}-\nabla p,$$

where ${\mathbf u}$ is the fluid velocity, $\rho$ is the fluid density, and $p$ the pressure. If we assume that $F=\nabla\Phi-2\rho\mathbf\Omega\times{\mathbf u}$ where $\Phi$ is a scalar potential, and the advective term on the left may be neglected (reasonable if the Rossby number is much less than unity) and that the flow is incompressible (density is constant), the equations become:

$$2\rho\mathbf\Omega\times{\mathbf u}=-\nabla p + \nabla \Phi,$$

where $\Omega$ is the angular velocity vector. If the curl of this equation is taken, the result is the Taylor–Proudman theorem:

$$({\mathbf\Omega}\cdot\nabla){\mathbf u}={\mathbf  0}.$$

To derive this, one needs the vector identities

$$\nabla\times(A\times B)=A(\nabla\cdot B)-(A\cdot\nabla)B+(B\cdot\nabla)A-B(\nabla\cdot A)$$

and

$$\nabla\times(\nabla p)=0\$$

and

$$\nabla\times(\nabla \Phi)=0\$$

(because the curl of the gradient is always equal to zero). Note that $\nabla\cdot{\mathbf\Omega}=0$ is also needed (angular velocity is divergence-free).

The vector form of the Taylor–Proudman theorem is perhaps better understood by expanding the dot product:

$$\Omega_x\frac{\partial {\mathbf u}}{\partial x} + \Omega_y\frac{\partial {\mathbf u}}{\partial y} + \Omega_z\frac{\partial {\mathbf u}}{\partial z}=0.$$

In coordinates for which $\Omega_x=\Omega_y=0$, the equations reduce to

$$\frac{\partial{\mathbf u}}{\partial z}=0,$$

if $\Omega_z\neq 0$. Thus, all three components of the velocity vector are uniform along any line parallel to the z-axis.

== Taylor column ==
The Taylor column is an imaginary cylinder projected above and below a real cylinder that has been placed parallel to the rotation axis (anywhere in the flow, not necessarily in the center). The flow will curve around the imaginary cylinders just like the real due to the Taylor–Proudman theorem, which states that the flow in a rotating, homogeneous, inviscid fluid are 2-dimensional in the plane orthogonal to the rotation axis and thus there is no variation in the flow along the $\vec{\Omega}$ axis, often taken to be the $\hat{z}$ axis.

The Taylor column is a simplified, experimentally observed effect of what transpires in the Earth's atmospheres and oceans.

== History ==
The result known as the Taylor-Proudman theorem was first derived by Sydney Samuel Hough (1870-1923), a mathematician at Cambridge University, in 1897. Proudman published another derivation in 1916 and Taylor in 1917, then the effect was demonstrated experimentally by Taylor in 1923.
