= 2024 in Antarctica =

- Decades: 2000s; 2010s; 2020s
- See also: Other events of 2024; Timeline of Antarctic history

This is a list of events occurring in Antarctica in 2024.

== Events ==
- 3 March — Scientists confirm that Ice levels have registered historic lows for a third consecutive year.
- 3 August — 2024 Antarctica heat wave: A record prolonged heat wave persists over Antarctica, with temperatures reaching 50 °F (28 °C) higher than average in some areas during the middle of winter.

== See also ==
- Southern Ocean
- South Pole
- Antarctic ice sheet
