= Ethan Guo =

American pilot and influencer (born 2005)

- Born: July 2005 (age 21); Tianjin, China
- Occupations: Pilot; Social media influencer

Instagram information
- Page: ethanguo.rtw
- Followers: 1.3 million

TikTok information
- Page: ethansbiography
- Followers: 411 thousand

Ethan Guo (born July 2005) is an American pilot and social media influencer known for his "Flight Against Cancer" campaign, an attempt to become the first person to fly solo to all seven continents in a small aircraft while raising funds for cancer research. His journey gained attention after he was detained by Chilean authorities in June 2025 for an unauthorized landing in Antarctica, due to legal complexities under the Antarctic Treaty System.

== Early life and education ==
Ethan Guo was born in late 2005 in Tianjin, China, and later moved to the United States, residing in West Palm Beach, Florida, as of 2025. Public information about his early education is limited, but Guo developed a passion for aviation at age 13, initiating flight training at that time. Guo claims he graduated high school early to achieve this. He obtained his private pilot license at age 17 and is Instrument Flight Rules (IFR)-rated, enabling him to navigate using instruments without visual ground references. By age 19, he had logged over 700 flight hours, having flown to all 48 contiguous U.S. states and crossed the Atlantic Ocean three times.

Guo's aviation pursuits were largely self-driven, as his parents initially opposed his flight plans, leading him to rely on volunteers and sponsors for support. He has also expressed interest in a career in business or technology, viewing his flights as a personal challenge rather than a professional aspiration. His social media presence, with 1.3 million Instagram followers and 329,000 TikTok followers as of July 2025, has allowed him to share his aviation journey with a global audience.

== Flight against cancer campaign ==
In September 2024, Guo launched the "Flight Against Cancer" campaign, aiming to raise $1 million for childhood cancer research at St. Jude Children's Research Hospital in Memphis, Tennessee. The campaign was motivated by his cousin's 2021 diagnosis with stage 4 Hodgkin's lymphoma, which inspired Guo to combine his aviation goals with philanthropy. His objective was to become the first person to fly solo to all seven continents in a modified Cessna 182Q aircraft, covering over 80,000 kilometers across 60 countries in approximately 100 days. The aircraft, registered as N182WT, was equipped with an additional fuel tank to support up to 17 hours of non-stop flight.

Guo started his journey in Memphis, Tennessee, in May 2024, visiting countries including the UAE, Pakistan, Australia, and the Philippines by June 23, 2025. By July 2025, he had raised $105,000, falling short of his $1 million goal but still contributing to St. Jude's mission. His social media updates where he documented his travels and promoted cancer awareness, engaged a broad audience, even though St. Jude noted that the fundraiser was not officially endorsed. The campaign aimed to highlight the importance of childhood cancer research and fund advancements in treatment and prevention.

== Unauthorized landings and detainment ==
In May 2025, Guo planned to fly from Kolkata, India to Thailand. Dangerous weather conditions forced Guo to divert to Myanmar where he landed without authorization. Guo was detained and questioned by authorities, but was let go without any charges the next day.

On June 28, 2025, Guo was detained by Chilean authorities after landing without authorization at Lieutenant Rodolfo Marsh Base on King George Island, within Chile's claimed Antarctic territory. He departed from Carlos Ibáñez del Campo Airport in Punta Arenas, Chile, in his Cessna 182Q, submitting a flight plan indicating a local flight over Punta Arenas or, in some reports, a route to Ushuaia, Argentina. Instead, he diverted to Antarctica, landing at Teniente R. Marsh Airport, an action Chile's General Directorate of Civil Aeronautics deemed an "unauthorized operation". Chilean prosecutors charged Guo with violating Articles 194 and 197 of the Chilean Aeronautical Code, addressing unauthorized landings and false flight plans, which could result in fines or short-term imprisonment.

Guo's lawyer, Karina Ulloa, stated that he encountered complications during the flight, describing it as an "exploratory flight" to assess the route's feasibility. Prosecutors, led by Cristian Crisosto Rifo, argued that Guo's actions endangered air traffic safety in Antarctica and the Magallanes region, violating both national laws and international regulations, including the Antarctic Treaty. The incident activated alert protocols due to the stringent regulations governing Antarctic airspace, which prioritize environmental protection and safety. Guo was detained upon landing but released pending a 90-day investigation, during which he must remain in Chile.

=== Trial and outcome ===
Following his detainment, Guo was forced to stay in Chilean territory, specifically at a Chilean base on King George Island, pending the outcome of a 90-day investigation. He was permitted to leave the island for Punta Arenas if weather conditions allow but cannot depart Chile until the legal proceedings conclude. On July 2, 2025, Guo posted on X, stating, "I'm alive everyone, I'll make an update soon", but shared no further details on social media. Guo turned 20 years old in July while detained on the island, and said he lost 20 pounds due to meager rations.

In August, a trial was held, where Guo's defense argued that Guo was granted sufficient authorization to deviate from his planned route and land in Antarctica due to "weather and technical circumstances". The defense was supported by a screenshot of a WhatsApp chat that allegedly showed a Chilean aviation official approving Guo's request to land on King George Island. Subsequently, a Chilean judge approved a deal in which prosecutors agreed to dismiss the case against Guo if he paid $30,000 to the Fundación Nuestros Niños, a Chilean children's cancer charity associated with the St. Jude's Children's Research Hospital in Memphis, Tennessee, United States, and does not re-enter any Chilean territory for the next three years. After initially saying that he was awaiting a flight back to the Chilean mainland, on September 6 Guo was transported back to Punta Arenas via naval ship and released following a delay due to adverse weather conditions. On February 12, 230 days after Ethan first landed in Antarctica, his plane was flown back to Carlos Ibáñez del Campo Airport in Punta Arenas by a Chilean pilot and escorted by a Chilean Air Force de Havilland Canada DHC-6 Twin Otter. Over the following days it was flown to Santiago and then to Mendoza, Argentina, the latter being where it will be handed over to its owner.

== See also ==
- Aviation law
- Seletar Flying Club
- 2025 in Antarctica
