= Taylor column =

Fluid dynamics phenomenon due to the Coriolis effect

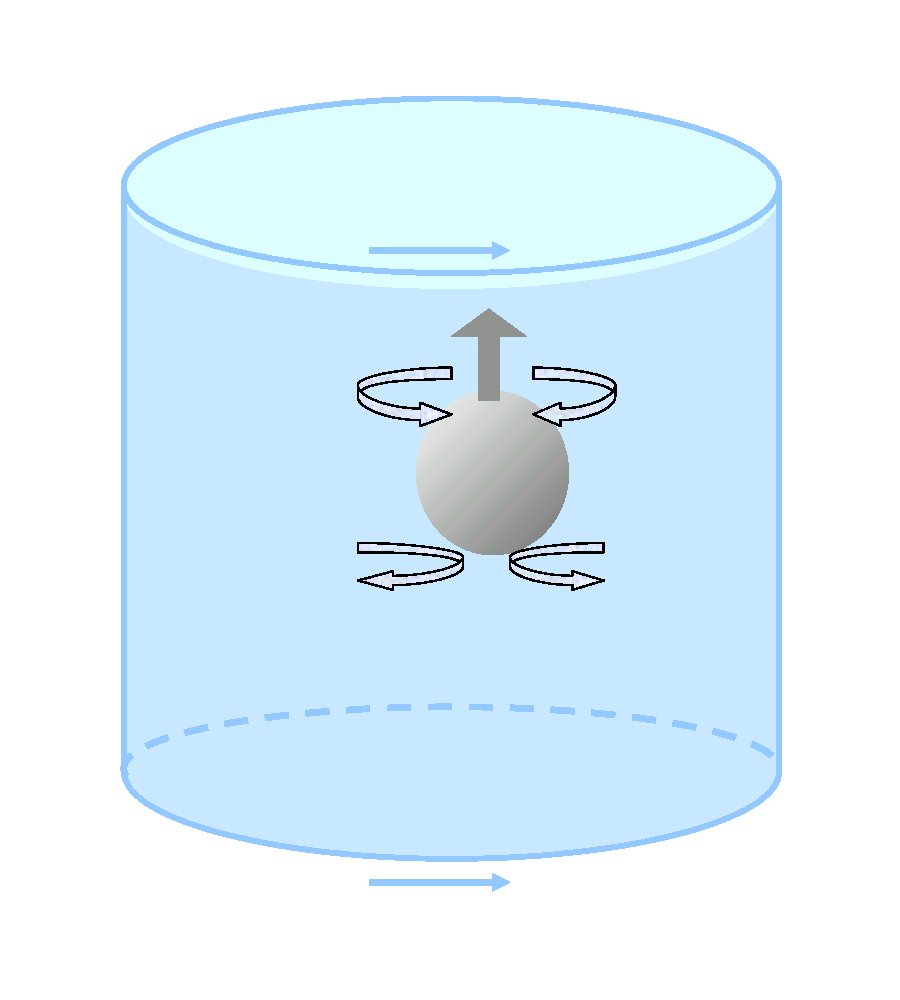
Motion of fluid above and below a moving object is forced to circulate, and are thus restricted to be within a column extended by the object in the axis of rotation.

A Taylor column is a fluid dynamics phenomenon that occurs as a result of the Coriolis effect. They were named after Geoffrey Ingram Taylor. Rotating fluids that are perturbed by a solid body tend to form columns parallel to the axis of rotation called Taylor columns.

An object moving parallel to the axis of rotation in a rotating fluid experiences more drag force than what it would experience in a non rotating fluid. For example, a strongly buoyant ball (such as a pingpong ball) will rise to the surface more slowly than it would in a non-rotating fluid. This is because fluid in the path of the ball that is pushed out of the way tends to circulate back to the point it is shifted away from, due to the Coriolis effect. The faster the rotation rate, the smaller the radius of the inertial circle traveled by the fluid.

A unit of fluid (represented by the black dot) is pushed back to the point it is shifted from.

In a non-rotating fluid the fluid parts above the rising ball and closes in underneath it, offering relatively little resistance to the ball. In a rotating fluid, the ball needs to push up a whole column of fluid above it, and it needs to drag a whole column of fluid along beneath it in order to rise to the surface.

A rotating fluid thus displays some degree of rigidity.

== History ==
Taylor columns were first observed by William Thomson, Lord Kelvin, in 1868. Taylor columns were featured in lecture demonstrations by Kelvin in 1881 and by John Perry in 1890. The phenomenon is explained via the Taylor–Proudman theorem, and it has been investigated by Taylor, Grace, Stewartson, and Maxworthy—among others.

== Theory ==
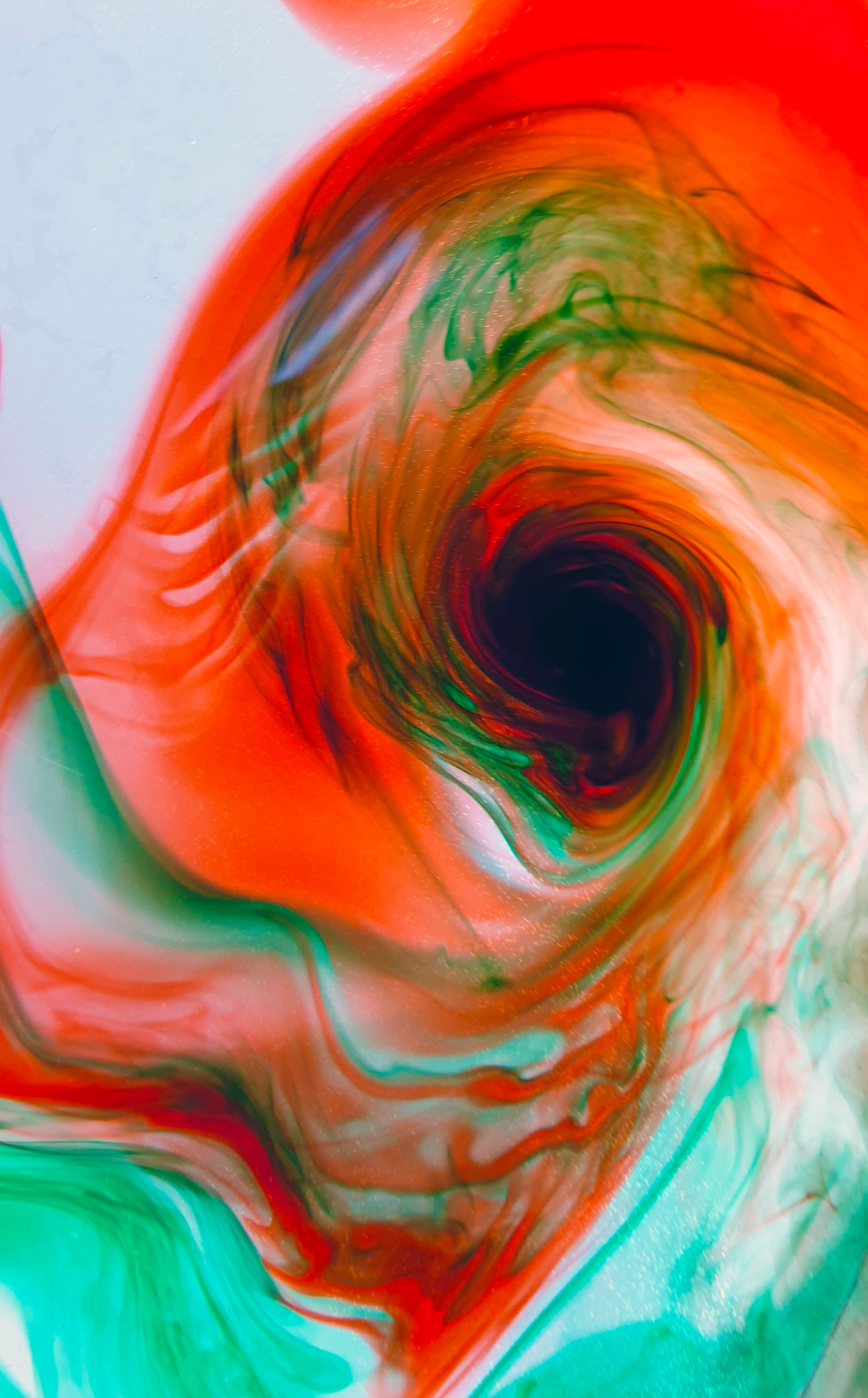
Taylor column in fluid

Taylor columns have been rigorously studied. For Re<<1, Ek<<1, Ro<<1, the drag equation for a cylinder of radius, a, the following relation has been found.

$F=\frac{16}{3}\rho a^{3}\Omega U$

To derive this, Moore and Saffman solved the linearised Navier–Stokes equation along in cylindrical coordinates, where some of the vertical and radial components of the viscous term are taken to be small relative to the Coriolis term:

$-2\Omega v=-\frac{1}{\rho}\frac{\partial p}{\partial r}$

$2\Omega u=\nu \left (\frac{\partial^2 v}{\partial r^2}+\frac{1}{r}\frac{\partial v}{\partial r}-\frac{v^2}{r} \right )$

$0=-\frac{1}{\rho}\frac{\partial p}{\partial z}+\nu \left (\frac{\partial^2 w}{\partial r^2}+\frac{1}{r}\frac{\partial w}{\partial r} \right )$

To solve these equations, we incorporate the volume conservation condition as well:

$\frac{1}{r} \frac{\partial (ur)}{\partial r}+\frac{\partial w}{\partial z}=0$

We use the Ekman compatibility relation for this geometry to restrict the form of the velocity at the disk surface:

$w-U=\pm\frac{1}{2}\sqrt{\frac{\nu}{\Omega}}\frac{1}{r}\frac{\partial (rv)}{\partial r}$

The resultant velocity fields can be solved in terms of Bessel functions.

$u=-\frac{\nu}{2\Omega}\int\limits_{0}^{\infin} k^2 A(k) J_1(kr)e^{-\nu k^3 z/2\Omega}dk$

$v=\int\limits_{0}^{\infin} A(k) J_1(kr)e^{-\nu k^3 z/2\Omega}dk$

$w=-\int\limits_{0}^{\infin} A(k) J_0(kr)e^{-\nu k^3 z/2\Omega}dk$

whereby for Ek<<1 the function A(k) is given by,

$A(k)=\frac{2Ua}{\pi}\left ( \cos ka - \frac{\sin ka}{ka} \right )$

Integrating the equation for the v, we can find the pressure and thus the drag force given by the first equation.

== Geophysical example ==
Taylor columns form above peaks in the South Scotia Ridge in the Southern Ocean. They affect circulation and mixing in the Weddell-Scotia Confluence where the Antarctic circumpolar current (ACC) and the subpolar Weddell Gyre mix.

The iceberg A23a is approximately 50 km across and broke free from the Antarctic coast in 1986. From July 2021 it tracked along the length of the Antarctic Peninsula, and in April 2024 it got stuck in one such Taylor Column in the ACC located over the Pirie Bank.
