= Seletar Flying Club =

Flying club in Singapore

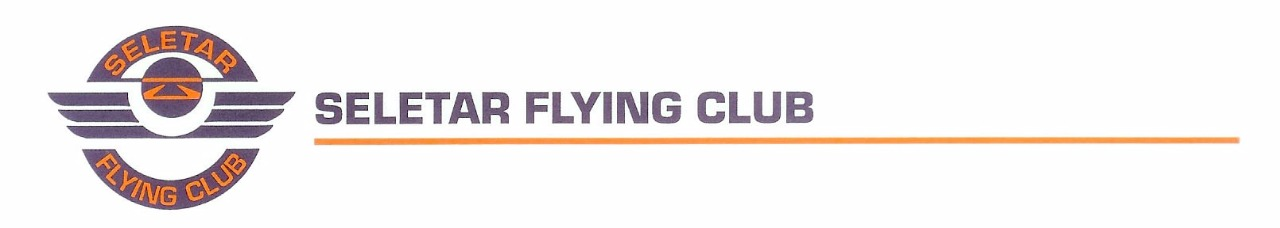
- Abbreviation: SFC
- Formation: 1 September 1987; 38 years ago
- Type: Flying club
- Headquarters: Seletar Airport
- Location: 700 West Camp Road, #06-05 Business Aviation Complex, Singapore 797649
- Region served: Singapore
- Services: flight training
- Website: http://seletarflyingclub.org/
- Formerly called: SIA Flying Club

The Seletar Flying Club was previously known as SIA Flying Club, it was set up to arouse an interest in flying among the Singapore Airlines staff. On 16 November 1992, the club made the decision to open its doors to the public who were keen to get a private pilot's license before applying for a pilot's career. On 17th October 2002, Seletar Flying Club was formed with the blessing of Singapore Airlines and assumes the assets and liabilities of SIA Flying Club.

== Current fleet ==
Seletar Flying Club operates a fleet of three light aircraft consisting of Cessna 172 and Piper PA-28 Cherokee.

== Activities ==
In 2020, the club inducted its youngest student pilot in Singapore, Tibeau Zhan Fraise, who was only ten years old at the time.

In 2024, the Seletar Flying Club welcomed Ethan Guo - a 19-year old Asian-American pilot flying solo to all seven continents in a small aircraft to raise money for cancer research - as he arrived in Singapore during the Southeast Asian leg of his journey. Guo began his journey with a 50-year-old Cessna 182 Skylane on May 31 in Memphis, Tennessee and arrived in the Philippines for his October 20 Japan itinerary.
