= A23a =

Large iceberg in Antarctica

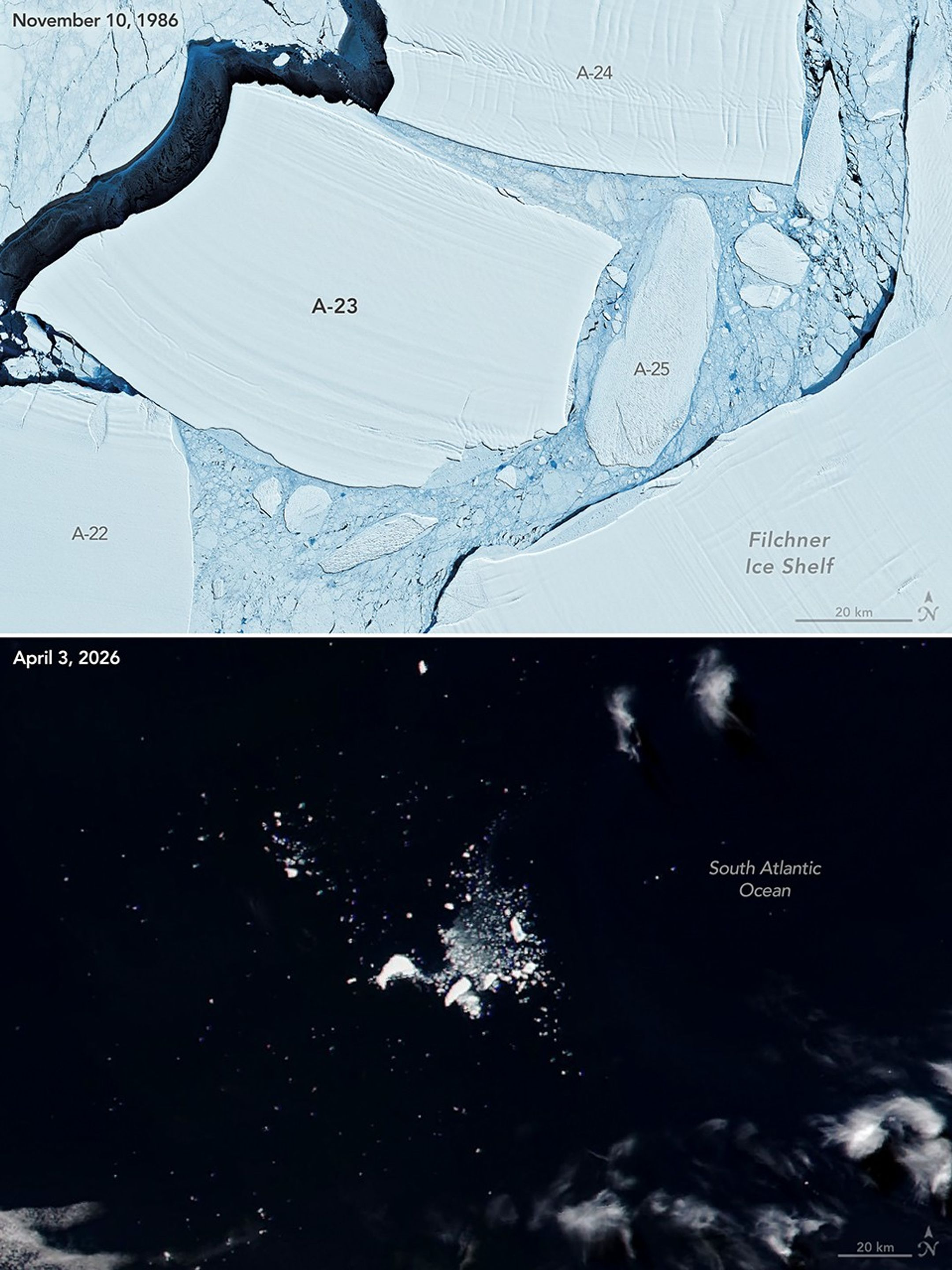
Comparison of A23a in 1986 and 2026

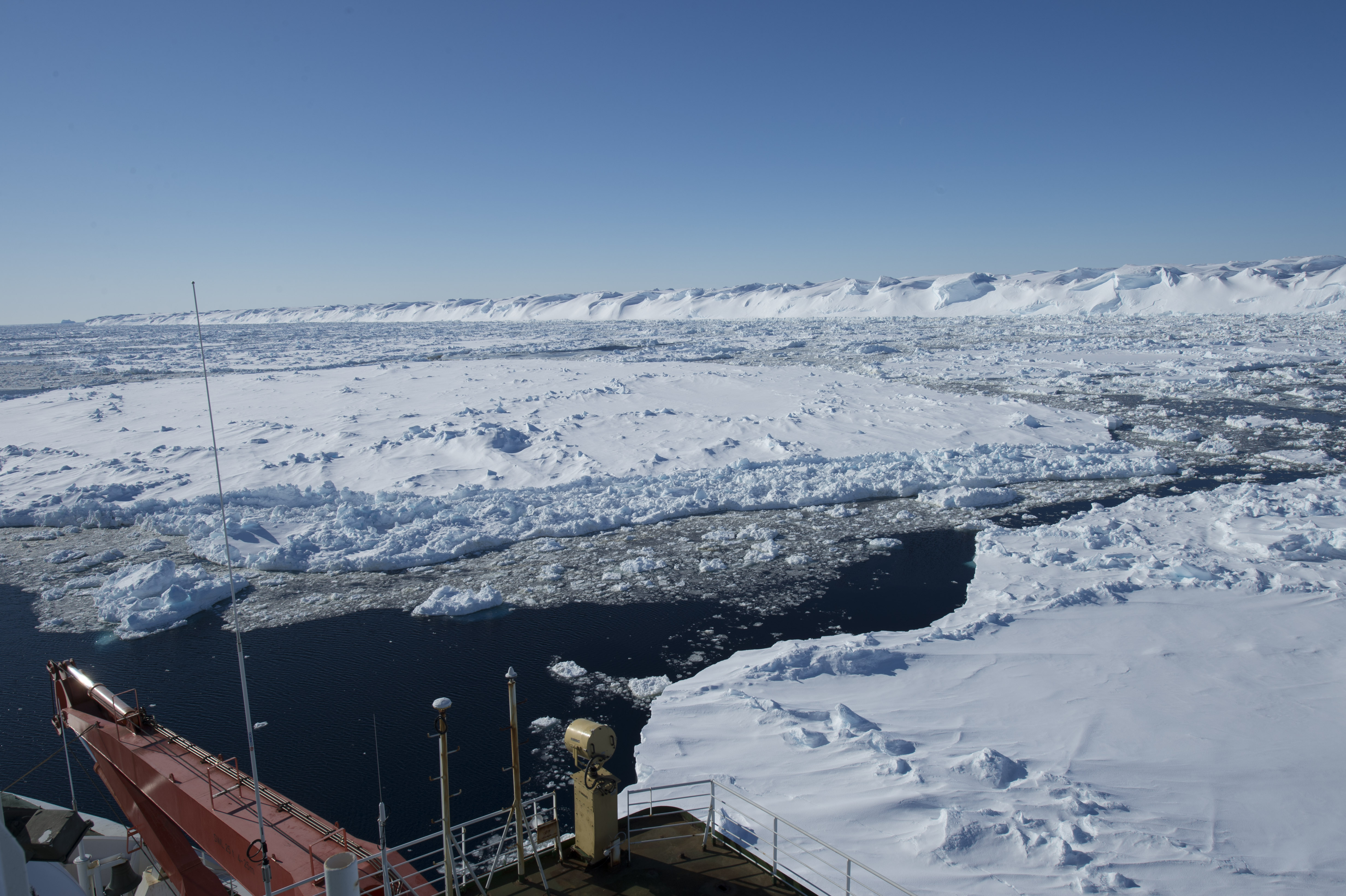
A23a as observed during RV POLARSTERN cruise PS96 in 2016 in the central Weddell Sea. Due to its age of 30 years, it is strongly eroded.

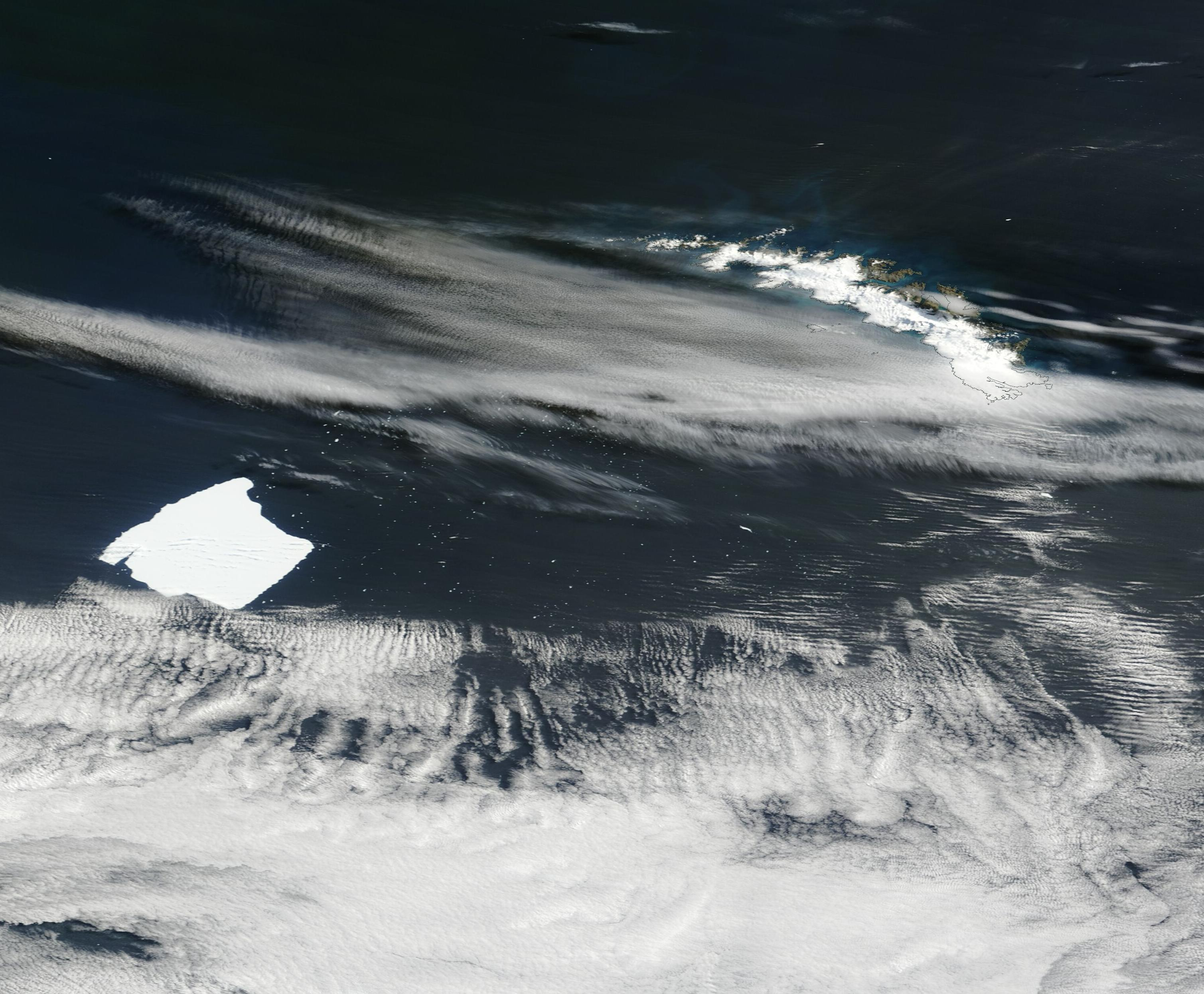
Iceberg A23a nearing South Georgia on 20 February 2025

Iceberg A23a was a large tabular iceberg which calved from the Filchner–Ronne Ice Shelf in 1986. It was stuck on the sea bed for many years but then started moving in 2020. As of January 2025, its area was about 3,500 square kilometres (1,400 sq mi), which made it the largest iceberg in the world. As of March 2025, it had run aground off South Georgia island. By July 2025, it had started drifting again. It later passed to the east and north of South Georgia, and in September 2025 it was observed to be breaking up in warmer waters. In March 2026, the largest remnant became small enough that formal monitoring ceased, and as of July 2026 the iceberg was thought to have either disintegrated completely or to be on the verge of doing so.

Drift of A23a (map data)

== History ==
The Antarctic research base Druzhnaya I, which was originally established on the Filchner–Ronne Ice Shelf, was situated on the iceberg when it calved. Subsequently, a rescue mission was started in 1987 and ultimately moved/renamed the base to Druzhnaya III.

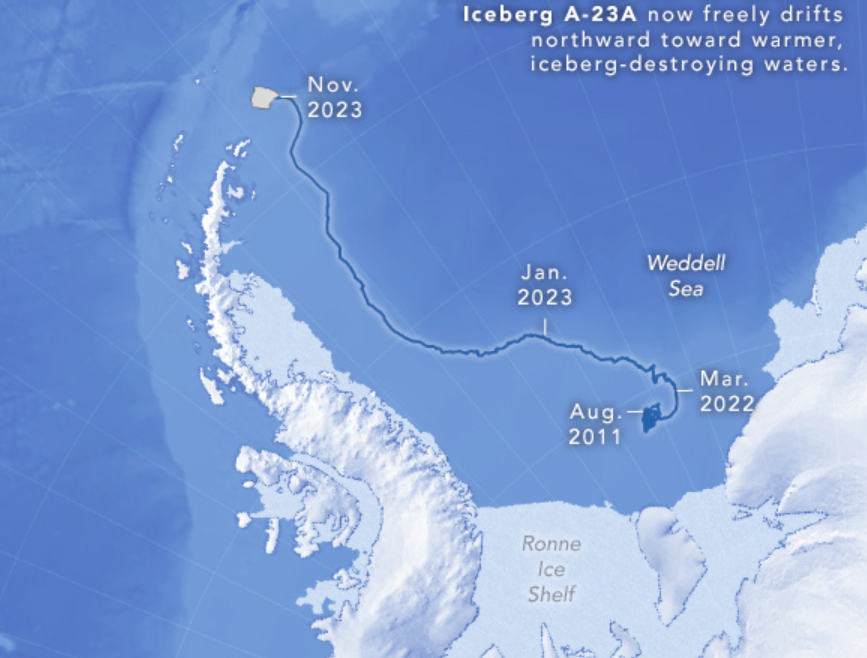
A23a's course from 2011 to 2023 mapped by the NASA Earth Observatory

In November 2023, A23a was tracked moving past the northern tip of the Antarctic Peninsula and heading towards the Southern Ocean. On 1 December 2023, the iceberg was intercepted by the polar research ship RRS Sir David Attenborough, off the tip of the Antarctic Peninsula. At 10 knots, it took the ship several hours to sail along two sides of the iceberg. A23a is expected to release a significant quantity of mineral dust as it melts, so the ship took water samples around its perimeter. Analysis of the samples published in 2026 suggested that at the time of those observations, its meltwater did not have a significant impact on the local ocean chemistry.

Satellite images in February 2024

On 14 January 2024, dramatic archways caused by wave action on A23a were documented by a drone operated by Eyos Expeditions videographer Richard Sidey and expedition leader Ian Strachan. Their footage was published widely by the BBC and CNN. In early April 2024, the iceberg entered the Antarctic Circumpolar Current but stayed in place as it was trapped in a Taylor column—as confirmed in August 2024—over the Pirie Bank seamount near the South Orkney Islands about 375 mi (604 km) from the Antarctic Peninsula, turning counterclockwise by around 15 degrees every day. In December 2024, the British Antarctic Survey (BAS) reported that the iceberg had exited the Taylor column and was now beginning to drift further north through the Southern Ocean.

The BAS expected A23a to follow the Antarctic Circumpolar Current towards the island of South Georgia in the southern Atlantic Ocean, where it would eventually encounter warmer water and break up into smaller icebergs. As of 23 January 2025, A23a was 173 mi (278 km) away from South Georgia and still on its way towards the island. Also in January, an expedition guide on a tourist ship spotted rusted debris visible in the edges of the iceberg, later confirmed to be un-salvaged remnants of Druzhnaya I.

In February 2025, a French documentary crew filmed around the iceberg for several days, observing whales, penguins, leopard seals and birds including snow petrels living on and around it.

On 4 March 2025, it was reported that A23a had grounded 73 km (45 mi) from South Georgia, marking the end of its drift since 2020, before it accelerated and then abruptly stopped near the island. Some scientists said it could threaten local wildlife by blocking key feeding grounds for penguins and seals, though others said they didn't expect it to significantly affect wildlife. Scientists warned that its melting could disrupt marine ecosystems by altering nutrient flows and krill populations, though it was also pointed out that its grounding would stir up nutrients from the seafloor and may boost the regional ecosystem. The event underscores the broader impact of climate change on Antarctic ice loss, with researchers closely monitoring its effects on biodiversity and regional stability.

On 31 July 2025, Iceberg A23a was reported 145 km (90 mi) east-southeast of South Georgia.

On 3 September 2025, Agence France-Presse (AFP) reported via multiple news outlets that A23a was in the process of breaking up having drifted north of South Georgia. It was reported that the iceberg was less than half its original size, but still about 1,770 square kilometres (680 sq mi) and 60 km (37 mi) at its widest point, according to AFP analysis. Chunks as large as 400 square kilometres (150 sq mi) were reported to have broken off while smaller pieces, many still large enough to threaten ships, were littering the sea around it.

On 15 November 2025, satellite images from Zoom.Earth identify the main remaining mass about 100 nautical miles west-northwest of South Georgia, with a surface area of approximately 1300 sq km or 1,300 square kilometres (500 sq mi). Other smaller masses are detected farther north, including one of about 300 sq km or 300 square kilometres (120 sq mi) located 260 nautical miles north of South Georgia.

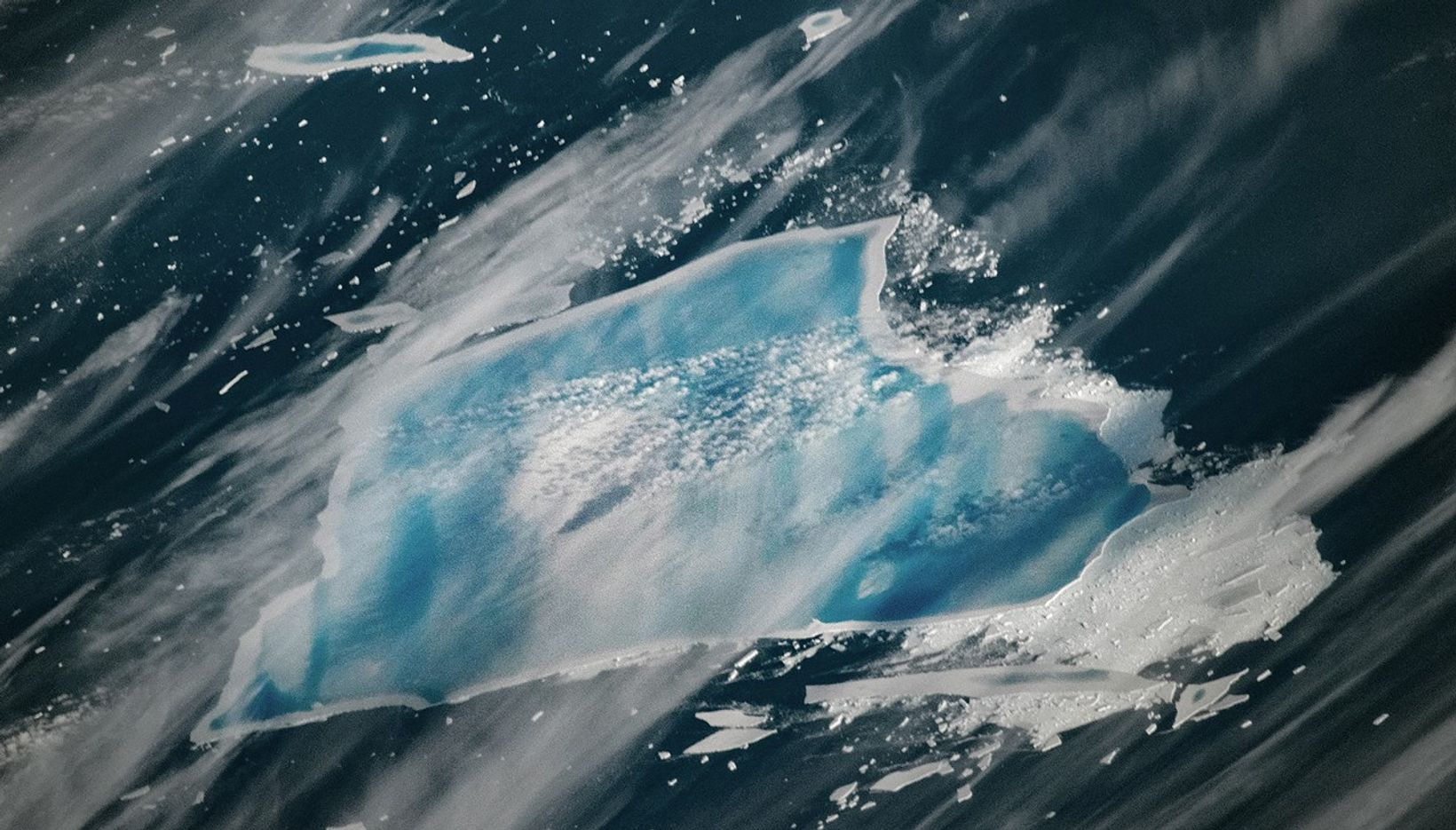
Meltwater on top of A23a, December 27, 2025

On 8 January 2026, NASA reported that A23a had blue meltwater on its surface and was on the verge of complete disintegration. Its area was given as 1182 sq km or 1,182 square kilometres (456 sq mi). The article stated that the iceberg was riding currents that were pushing it towards warmer waters and that complete disintegration could occur within days or weeks. Satellite imagery also showed plumes of chlorophyll trailing after it, suggesting that the release of meltwater triggered a phytoplankton bloom.

In March 2026, the iceberg had shrunk down to 180 sq km or 180 square kilometres (69 sq mi) and the BBC reported that once it reached 70 square kilometres, scientists would stop tracking it.

== In media ==
In February and March 2025, a crew led by documentarian Jérôme Bouvier filmed around A23a for several days, including diving alongside it. The resulting film was released as Le Radeau Des Glaçes in France and as Ice Nomads in English.

Sound recordings taken by Kat Turner during the RRS Sir David Attenborough's 2023 observations of A23a are incorporated into the track "A23a: The Largest Iceberg in the World" by Sounds of Space Project, a band consisting of space weather research scientist Nigel Meredith, musicologist Kim Cunio, and artist-engineer Diana Scarborough.

The BBC's World Service broadcast a documentary, A23a: Biography of an iceberg, in 2026.

== See also ==
- A-76 – largest iceberg for several months in 2021
- B-15 – largest recorded iceberg with precise measurements
- 2025 in Antarctica
