= Midwinter Day =

Celebration of winter solstice in Antarctica

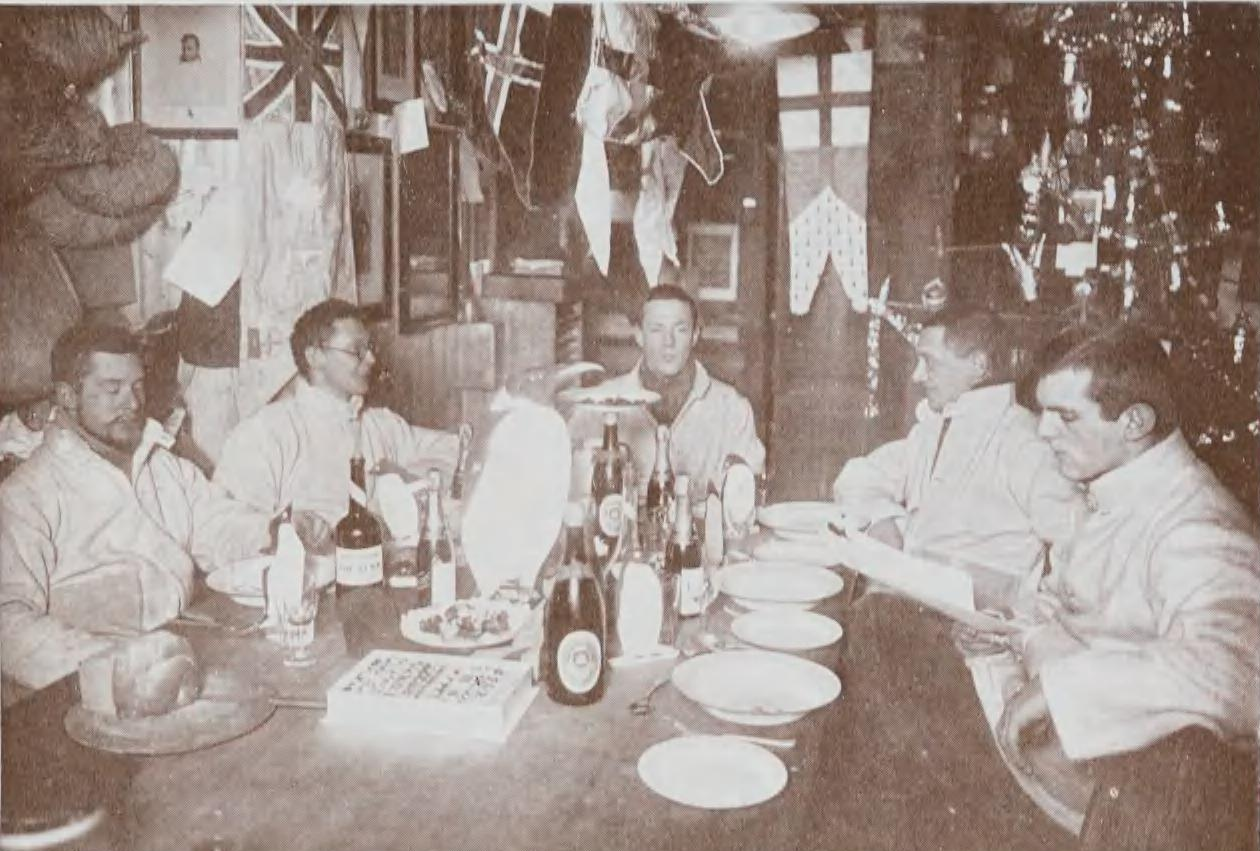
- Celebration of Midwinter Day in 1912
- Also called: Midwinter, Midwinter Festival, Winter Solstice
- Observed by: Personnel at research stations in Antarctica
- Type: Default
- Significance: Date of the winter solstice and half-way point through the polar night
- Celebrations: Large meals, card exchanges, gift exchanges
- Date: June 20 or June 21
- 2025 date: June 21
- Frequency: Annual
- Related to: Antarctica Day

Midwinter Day, or Midwinter, is an annual celebration held across Antarctica on the day of the southern winter solstice (June 20 or 21). It is the continent's primary cultural holiday and, along with Antarctica Day, is one of two principal Antarctic holidays. It is a celebration for personnel overwintering at Antarctic research stations, although some people off the continent observe it as well.

== History ==
In 1898, the crew of the Belgica were the first to spend Midwinter Day in Antarctica, although there was no celebration to commemorate it. The tradition of Midwinter celebration is most often credited to Robert Falcon Scott and the crew of the Discovery Expedition who, on June 23, 1902, observed "mid-winter festival" in a deliberate imitation of Christmas. The crew cooked and ate Christmas food, decorated the quarters in a "Christmasy" appearance, and opened Christmas presents which they had brought down with them and saved for this occasion.

Expeditions during the Heroic Age of Antarctic Exploration continued the tradition. Members of the Nimrod Expedition, Terra Nova Expedition, Australasian Antarctic Expedition, and the Imperial Trans-Antarctic Expedition all observed the holiday with feasts, decorations, and performances. These later celebrations no longer imitated Christmas, but established Midwinter Day as a holiday in its own right.

Following the establishment of several year-round stations in Antarctica after World War II, many more people began to winter over in Antarctica. Midwinter Day became a continent-wide event, although stations varied in the degree and manner in which they celebrated.

== Traditions ==
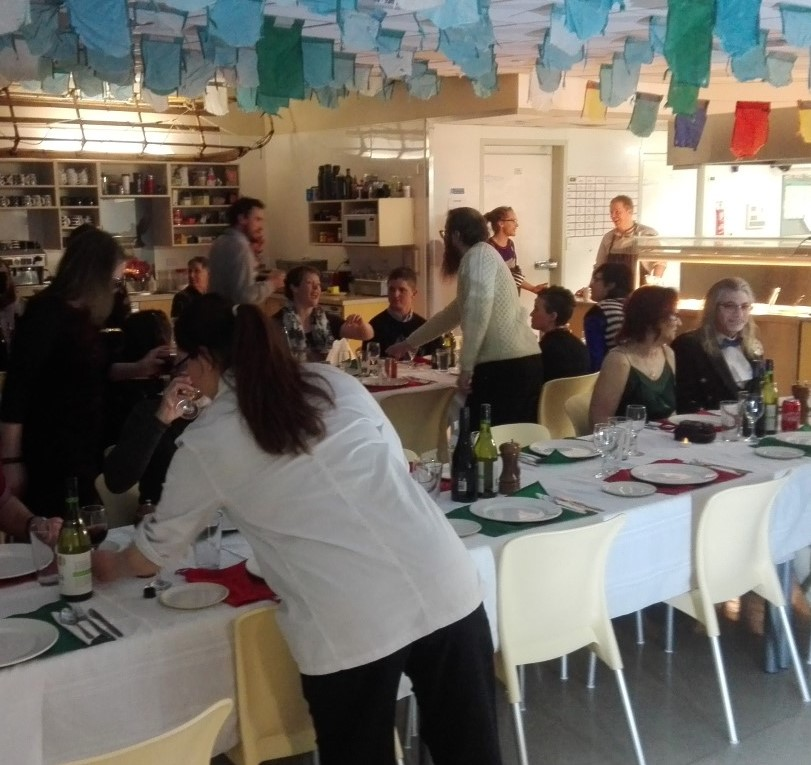
A Midwinter dinner at Scott Base, Antarctica

The meal is the centerpiece of Midwinter Day celebration. Stations frequently cook multicourse meals using premium ingredients. Because winter resupplies are still a rare occurrence, most of the ingredients for these courses are saved for months specifically for the celebration. Alcohol and expensive foods such as lobster and ribeye steak are included in the annual summer food shipment for such occasions. Previous feasts had included local fare such as penguin and seal; today consuming the local wildlife is illegal. Stations will usually decorate the galley as part of the celebrations as well. Both historically and currently, flags are often used as part of these decorations. Station personnel frequently wear more formal attire to the celebrations. Some stations will exchange gifts as well.

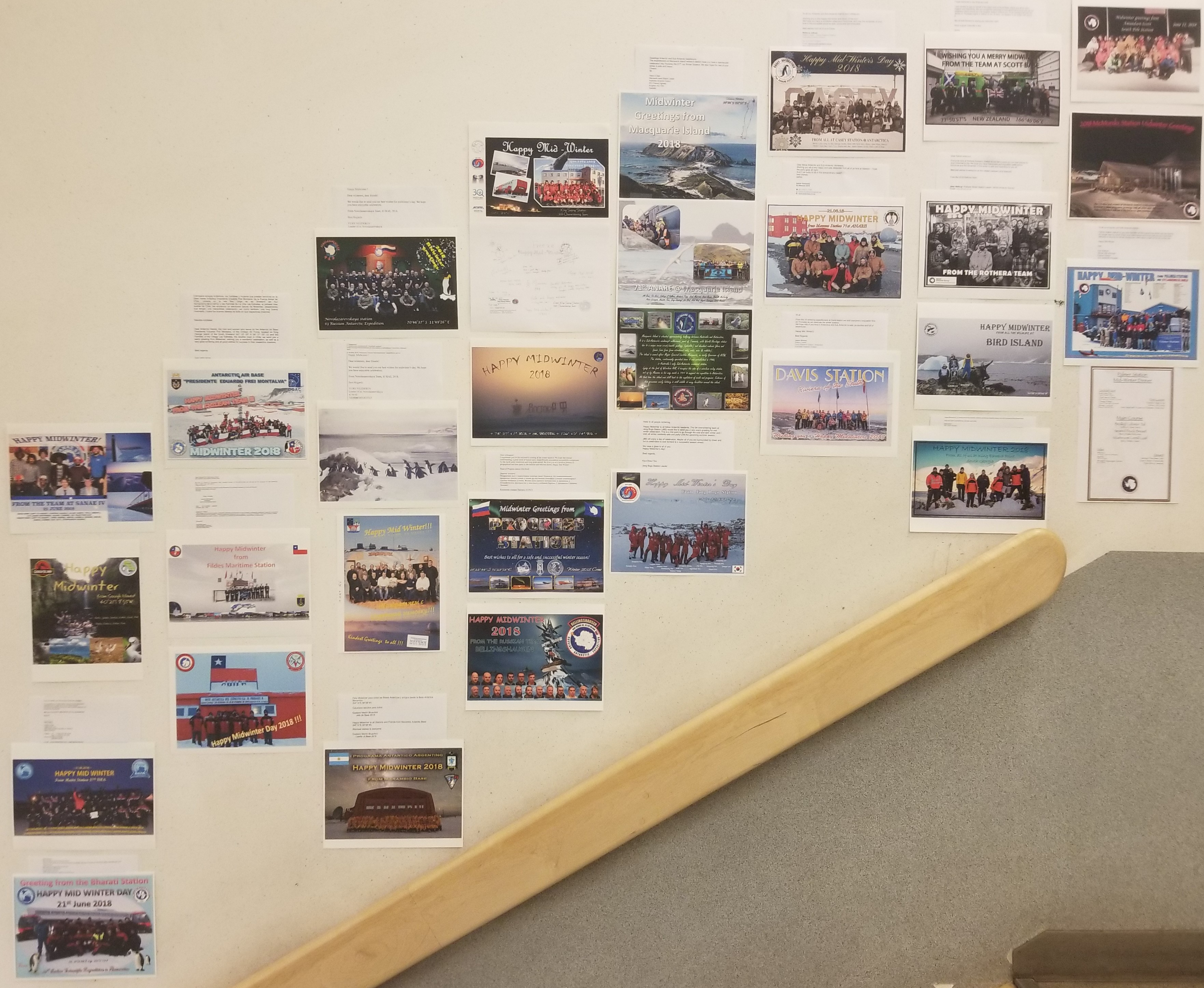
Midwinter greetings from other stations hang on the wall at McMurdo.

Another longstanding tradition has been the exchange of greetings from among the overwintering crews. National leaders, such as the President of the US and the Prime Minister of the UK, also send greetings to the stations of their respective countries. Today, as in the earliest days of Midwinter celebrations, personnel often give performances such as music, dance, and theater.

Some stations have celebrations unique to their location or country of management. The British receive a specially tailored programme from the BBC World Service. McMurdo Station has themes for their Midwinter parties, such as "Under the Sea" and "The Endurance." Some sites might engage in Polar bear plunges, or a midwinter run, occasionally naked. In some locations the holiday begins with breakfast in bed. On a number of stations, a tradition has emerged of watching horror films about being trapped in snow, such as The Shining or The Thing.

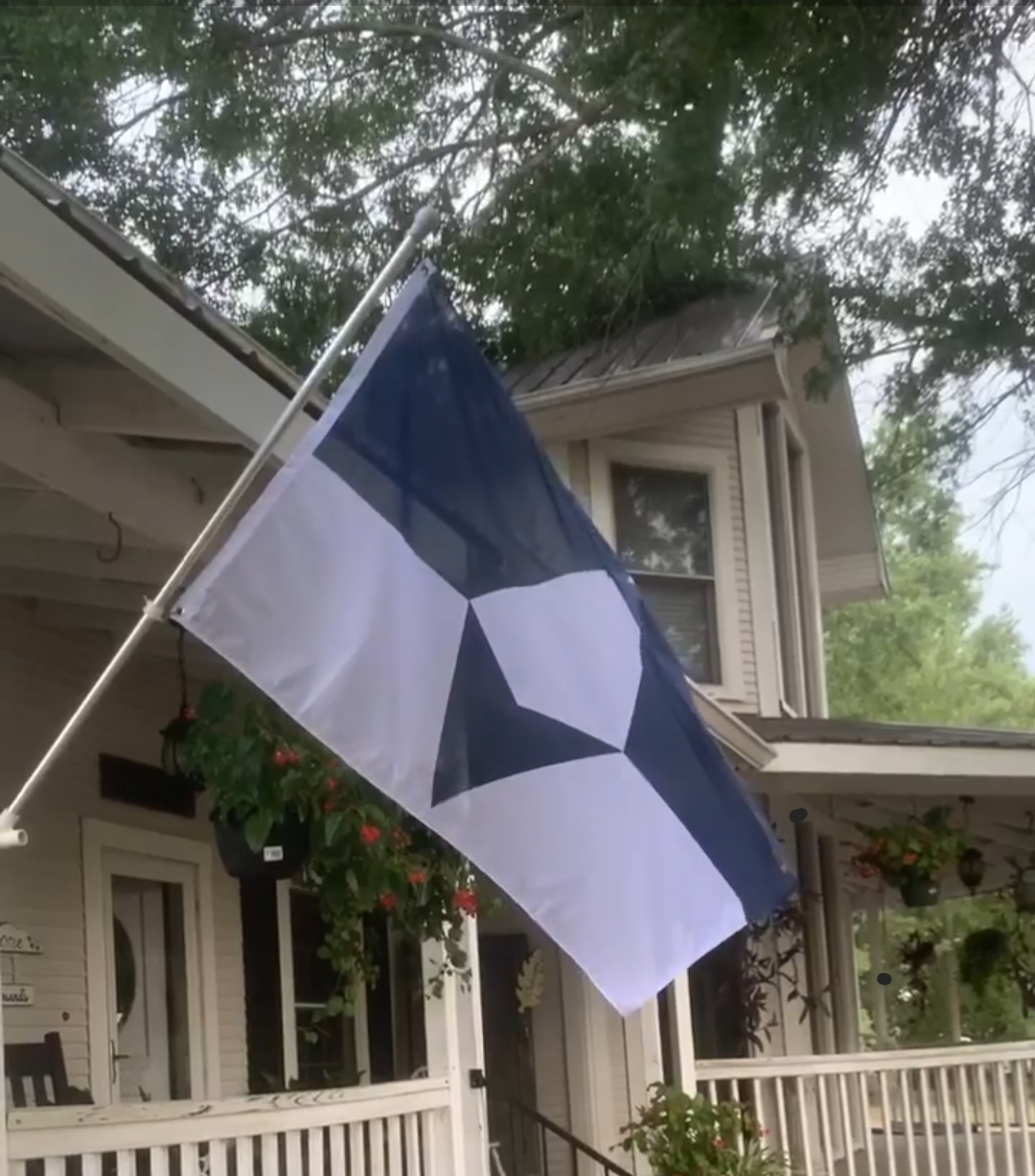
The flag of Antarctica flies outside a house in the USA on Antarctica's Midwinter Day.

== Celebrations outside Antarctica ==
Unlike Antarctica Day which is more widely celebrated off the continent than on, Midwinter Day is primarily celebrated in Antarctica. However, some people in other continents, especially former overwinter participants of Antarctic programs, still observe the holiday by posting Antarctic photos on social media or gathering with friends and colleagues from Antarctica.
