= ARA Bahía Agradable =

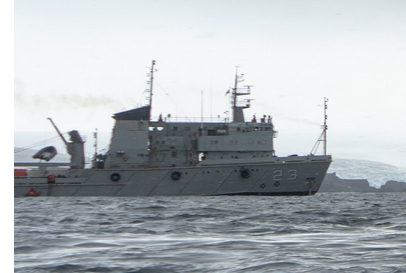
- ARA Bahía Agradable

History

Argentina
- Name: Bahía Agradable
- Namesake: Bluff Cove/Bahía Agradable
- Builder: Szczecin Shipyard, Szczecin, Poland
- Launched: May 1990
- Completed: 1990
- In service: 5 December 2015
- Identification: Pennant number: A-23; IMO number: 8418617; MMSI number: 701831000
- Status: in service as of 2015

General characteristics
- Displacement: 2723 tons (full)
- Length: 81.37 m (267.0 ft)
- Beam: 16.3 m (53 ft)
- Draft: 5.2 m (17 ft)
- Speed: 15 knots (28 km/h)
- Complement: 30 crew
- Armament: none

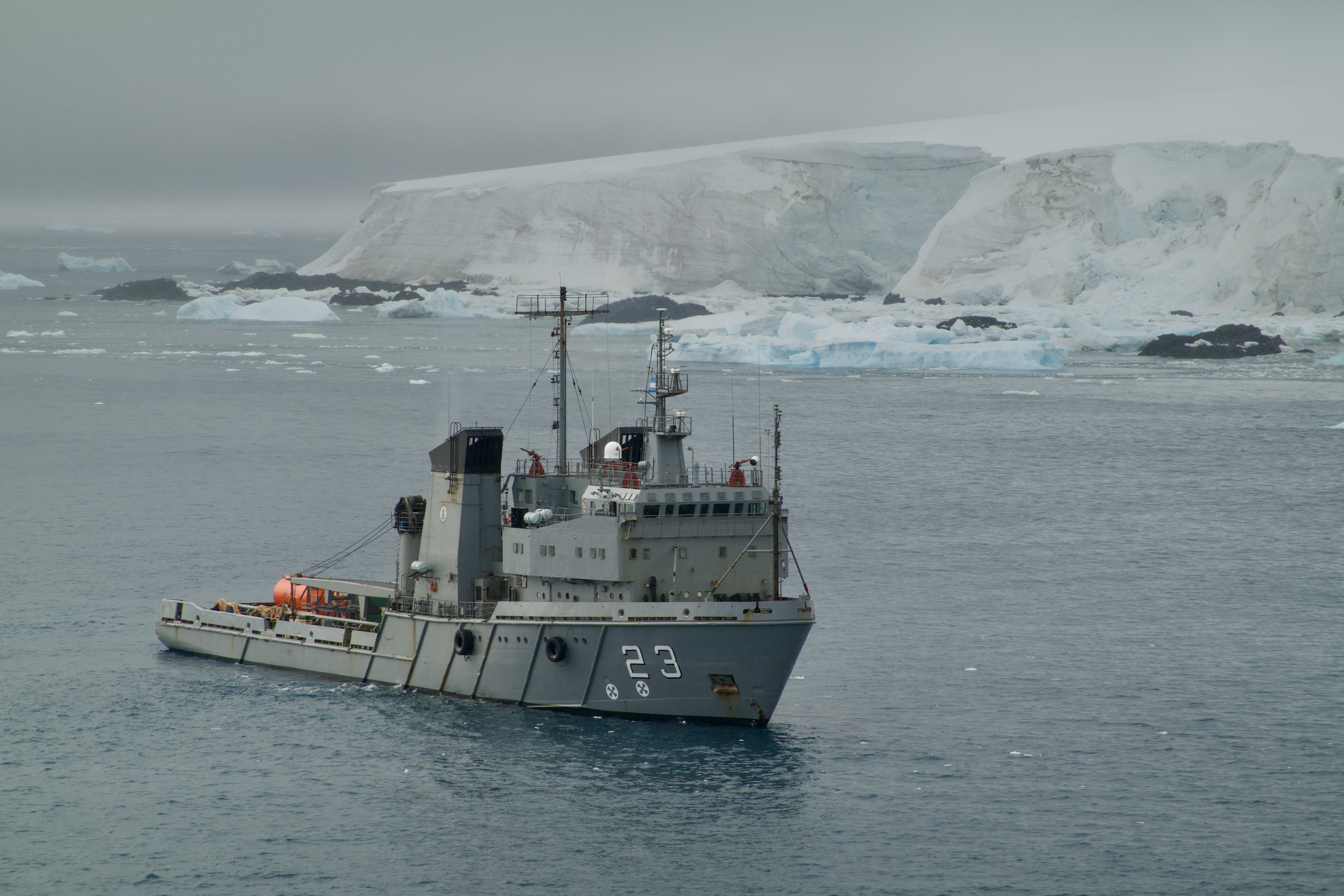
ARA Bahía Agradable

ARA Bahía Agradable (A-23) is an icebreaker and survey ship in service in the Argentine Navy. She has a reinforced hull in order to operate in waters around Antarctica.
