= Antarctica Day =

Celebration of the anniversary of the Antarctic Treaty

- Emblem of the Antarctic Treaty
- Observed by: Personnel at research stations in Antarctica
- Type: Default
- Significance: The anniversary of the signing of the Antarctic Treaty in 1959
- Celebrations: Public talks, educational activities, media consumption, flag flying
- Date: December 1
- Frequency: Annual
- Related to: Midwinter Day

Antarctica Day is an international holiday recognizing the anniversary of the signing of the Antarctic Treaty in 1959. It is celebrated on December 1 each year. Along with Midwinter Day, it is one of Antarctica's two principal holidays.

== History ==
Antarctica Day was established by the Foundation for the Good Governance of International Spaces in 2010 as a way to highlight the international cooperation that makes governance of the continent possible and to encourage educators to incorporate Antarctica in their curriculum. Antarctica Day was created following the Antarctic Treaty Summit in 2009 on the 50th anniversary of the Antarctic Treaty.

== Celebration ==
As a relatively recent holiday, Antarctica Day has no longstanding traditions. Unlike Midwinter Day, Antarctica Day is more widely celebrated off the continent than on it.

Antarctic organizations based outside of the continent, such as National Antarctic Programs or the government of Antarctic gateway cities, will often observe the holiday with public programming such as talks or movie screenings.

Individuals with professional or personal interest in Antarctica also celebrate Antarctica Day. Some consume Antarctica-related media, such as documentaries or podcasts. Others make social media posts regarding Antarctica. Flag flying is another common way people observe the holiday.
