= RSV Nuyina =

Australian icebreaking research vessel

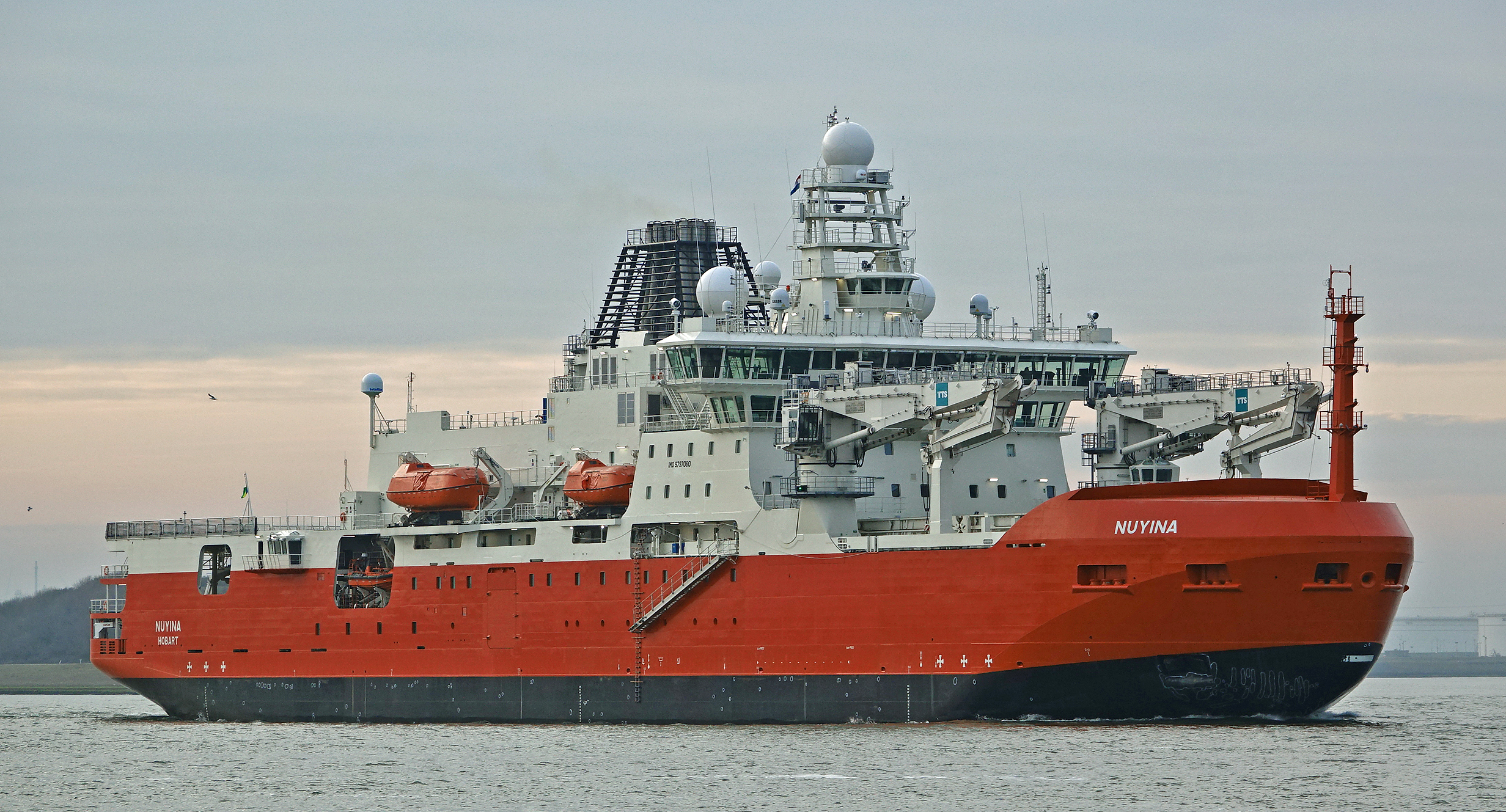
- RSV Nuyina undergoing sea trials in the North Sea, November 2020

History

Australia
- Name: Nuyina
- Namesake: Palawa kani for southern lights
- Owner: The Australian Government
- Operator: Serco
- Port of registry: Hobart, Australia
- Ordered: 2015
- Builder: Damen Galați shipyard (Galați, Romania)
- Yard number: 417
- Laid down: 8 September 2017
- Launched: 24 September 2018
- Completed: 19 August 2021
- Identification: IMO number: 9797060; MMSI number: 503000183; Call sign: VMIC
- Status: In service

General characteristics
- Type: Icebreaker, Research vessel
- Displacement: 25,500 tonnes
- Length: 160.3 m (526 ft)
- Beam: 25.6 m (84 ft)
- Draught: 9.3 m (31 ft)
- Ice class: Polar Class 3 Icebreaker(+)
- Installed power: 2 × MAN 16V32/44CR; (2 × 9,600 kW); Four diesel generators
- Propulsion: CODLAD system; Two variable pitch propellers; Three bow thrusters; Three stern thrusters
- Speed: 16 knots (30 km/h; 18 mph) max; 12 knots (22 km/h; 14 mph) cruise; 3 knots (5.6 km/h; 3.5 mph) through; 1.65 m (5 ft) of ice
- Range: 16,000 nautical miles (30,000 km; 18,000 mi)
- Endurance: 90 days
- Capacity: 1,900 m^{3} (67,000 cu ft) of cargo fuel; 1,200 tonnes of cargo; 96 TEU; 117 passengers
- Crew: 32
- Aircraft carried: Up to four helicopters
- Aviation facilities: Hangar and helideck

RSV Nuyina is an icebreaking research and supply vessel that supports Australian scientific activities and research bases in Antarctica. Capable of deploying a wide range of vehicles, including helicopters, landing barges and amphibious trucks, the ship provides a platform for marine science in sea ice and open water, with a large moon pool for launching and retrieving sampling equipment and remotely operated vehicles.

== Design and construction ==
The original concept was developed by the Danish engineering company Knud E Hansen. Design and construction of the vessel was managed by the Dutch Damen Group at their shipyard in Romania.

Following a contractual agreement on 28 April 2016 with DMS Maritime, a subsidiary of Serco, for delivery, operation and maintenance, the ship's design and construction was contracted to Damen Group. The design was contracted to naval architects Knud E Hansen of Denmark. In August 2017, keel laying took place at Damen's Galați shipyard in Romania. Coins from Denmark, Netherlands, Romania, and Australia were welded to the keel as part of the keel laying.

By March 2018, about 7,000 tons out of 10,000 had been cut, and the base of the hull had been completed. In September 2018, the hull was successfully floated in the building dock and taken to the outfitting quay. It was then towed to Vlissingen in the Netherlands for fitting out.

The vessel was handed over on 19 August 2021. In September it travelled from the Netherlands to Australia.

== RSV Nuyina's Ship's Bell ==
The bell for the Bridge of RSV Nuyina was presented by the President of the ANARE Club at the ship's official launch on 18 December 2021. It was manufactured in Maryborough, Queensland, by Olds Engineering, from AS1567 - C92610 commonly referred to as G1 or ‘Admiralty gunmetal’, 88% copper, 10% tin, 2% zinc, supplied by Hayes Metals of New Zealand & Australia.

The bell was engraved in Bendigo, Victoria, by National Engraving. The bell's lanyard was made by Dr Barbara Frankel from Tasmania. The whole project, from metal, manufacture, engraving and knotting, was donated by those involved, as a gift to the Australian Antarctic Division for RSV Nuyina.

== Naming ==
On 29 September 2017, the name Nuyina (pronounced "noy-yee-nah") was announced by the Minister for the Environment, Josh Frydenberg. The name is the word in the palawa kani language of Aboriginal Tasmanians for the southern lights. The name was suggested by school students in the 'Name our Icebreaker' competition, and is jointly attributed to students from St Virgil's College, Hobart and Secret Harbour Primary School, Perth. On 22 November 2017, 6 students from each school flew to Wilkins Aerodrome in Antarctica and spent three hours on the ice meeting scientists and expeditioners.

The name Nuyina evokes the names of previous ships involved in Australian Antarctic research and investigation:

- Aurora Australis (1989–2020), Australia's previous icebreaking research and resupply vessel
- SY Aurora (1876–1918), used by Douglas Mawson for exploring the continent (1910–14) and Ernest Shackleton

== Service ==
Nuyina began sea trials in the North Sea on 23 November 2020.

Nuyina entered Damen Schiedam dry-dock in February 2021 for an unspecified reason.

It will be operated by Serco under the direction of the Australian Antarctic Division for the Australian Government. It will support science operations in the Antarctic, as well as resupplying the Australian Antarctic Division stations: Casey, Davis, Mawson and Macquarie Island.

Due to mechanical problems in the propulsion line, Nuyina was repaired in Singapore under warranty, unable to be used during the 2022-23 Antarctic season. It resumed service in May 2023.

In 2023, it was reported that Nuyina would have to sail to Burnie on the other side of Tasmania, some 360 nautical miles (670 km) away by sea, for refuelling before heading out to Antarctica. The ship's permission to pass under the Tasman Bridge to reach the refuelling station at Selfs Point, about 2.2 nautical miles (4 km) from its home berth in Hobart, was revoked due to safety concerns: due to its icebreaking hull form demonstrating excessive side slip during simulations and sea trials, Nuyina was found to have insufficient directional stability to safely complete the turn required before passing between the bridge pylons when sailing out. While the ship's protruding bridge wings were extended by 3.6 metres (12 ft) during construction to improve visibility near the ship's sides, this did not have an impact on the decision on the ruling.

In late August 2023, the Nuyina sailed from Tasmania towards Australia's Casey Station research base on the Bailey Peninsula in Antarctica. Two helicopters from the Nuyina rescued a member of the team at the base who was suffering a medical emergency that required evacuation.

== Science capabilities ==
=== Scientific Data from RSV Nuyina ===
Data from Nuyina can be accessed through https://data.aad.gov.au/.

=== Fixed laboratories ===
- Air chemistry space
- Dry labs x 2
- Meteorological lab
- Wet labs x 2
- Wet well

=== Containerised laboratories ===
- 15 serviced lab module slots (services equiv to fixed wet labs)
- 9 serviced support module slots

=== Science spaces ===
- Aft control room
- Aft Deck ~ 500m2
- Battery charging rooms x 2
- Crows nest
- CTD hangar
- Electronics laboratory
- Foremast
- Gas bottles storage lockers x 4
- Hazardous material store
- Laboratory store
- Observation huts
- Sea ice refueling area
- Sea ice staging area
- Sea ice staging drying room
- Science cool and cold stores
- Science frozen store lobby
- Science meeting room
- Science Offices
- Science Operations Room
- Science winch room

=== Scientific Deployment Systems ===
- A frame 30t static with 10t and 5t winches
- Air sampling pipes in foremast x 2
- CTD hangar overhead crane
- CTD winches fibre optic x 2 (EOM)
- Deep core handling system
- Deep sea coring winch
- Deep sea towing winch fibre optic (EOM)
- Drop keels x 2
- Forward outboard deployment system
- General purpose CTD hangar winch
- General purpose winch
- Moonpool and cursor frame
- Multi-purpose overhead crane 10t
- Sea ice ramp
- Side outboard deployment system (SODS)
- Towed body winch fibre optic (EOM)
- Trawl winches x 2
- Tugger winches x 2
- Twin net drum

=== Scientific data collection systems ===
==== Scientific Data Management System (SDMS) ====
- KVM matrix switching
- Scientific racks

==== Acoustic ====
- Acoustic doppler current profiler (ADCP) in drop keel
- ADCP in hull
- Broadband echo sounders in hull (38, 50, 70, 120 & 200 kHz)
- Broadband echo sounders in drop keel (18, 38, 70, 120 & 200 kHz)
- Bubble monitoring cameras and noise monitoring hydrophones for Silent R and acoustic systems
- Deep multi beam echo sounder system in hull
- High resolution multi beam bathymetric echo sounder (MBES) system in drop keel
- Hydrophones for acoustic releases in hull
- Hydrophones for mammalian observations in drop keel
- Net monitoring transducers in drop keels
- Retractable high frequency Omni fisheries sonar
- Side looking multi beam in drop keel
- Sub bottom profiler in hull
- Sound velocity probes in the hull and drop keel
- USBL (ultra-short baseline system) in hull

==== Atmospheric ====
- Accumulated rain sensor
- Air pressure monitor
- Air temperature sensors (port, starboard and foremast)
- Automated total sky imager
- Ceilometer cloud height sensor
- Ice and wave radar
- Long wave infrared radiation sensors (port and starboard)
- Photosynthetic active radiation (PAR) sensors (port and starboard)
- Relative humidity (port and starboard)
- Sea surface skin temperature
- Solar (short wave) radiation sensors (port and starboard)
- UV biometer (port and starboard)
- UV radiation sensors (port and starboard)
- Wind speed and direction sensors (port, starboard and foremast)
- X-band weather radar

==== Seawater ====
- Acidity (pH)
- Conductivity, temperature and salinity (thermosalinograph)
- CO_{2} concentrations in seawater and air
- Fast rate repetition fluorometer (FRRF) with flow through chamber
- Laser optical particle counter
- Optical dissolved O_{2} sensor
- Seawater inlet temperature
- System pressure

=== Science equipment ===
- -86 °C ultra low freezers x 2
- -135 °C ultra low freezer
- C-channel (science spaces and aft science deck)
- Chemical storage freezer x 4
- Chemical storage fridge x 4
- Compressed instrument air (pure) in labs
- CUFES (continuous underway fish egg sampler)
- Deck inserts (science spaces and aft science deck)
- Display computers
- Flammable and corrosive chemical storage cabinets (vented) x 11
- Fumes cupboards x 5
- Liquid nitrogen bulk storage and dispenser units (200L) x 2
- Reagent grade water in labs
- Science container interface
- Trace metal free seawater in labs
- Ultra pure (Milli Q) water x 2
- Vacuum waste system in labs

=== Science tender ===
- A frame
- Moon pool
- Multi beam echo sounder
- Science winch
- Sub bottom profiler
- Sound velocity profiler
