= COVID-19 pandemic in Antarctica =

COVID-19 viral pandemic in Antarctica

- Confirmed cases in Antarctica
- Disease: COVID-19
- Pathogen: SARS-CoV-2
- Location: Antarctica
- First outbreak: Wuhan, Hubei, China
- Index case: Base General Bernardo O'Higgins (Chile)
- Arrival date: 21 December 2020 (5 years, 8 months, 3 weeks and 4 days ago)
- Confirmed cases: 226
- Active cases: 0
- Suspected cases: 1
- Recovered: 226
- Deaths: 0

The COVID-19 pandemic in Antarctica was part of the worldwide pandemic of coronavirus disease 2019 (COVID-19) caused by severe acute respiratory syndrome coronavirus 2 (SARS-CoV-2). Due to its remoteness and sparse population, Antarctica was the last continent to have confirmed cases of COVID-19 and was one of the last regions of the world affected directly by the pandemic. The first cases were reported in December 2020, almost a year after the first cases of COVID-19 were detected in China. At least 36 people are confirmed to have been infected. Even before the first cases on the continent were reported, human activity in Antarctica was indirectly impacted.

== Background ==
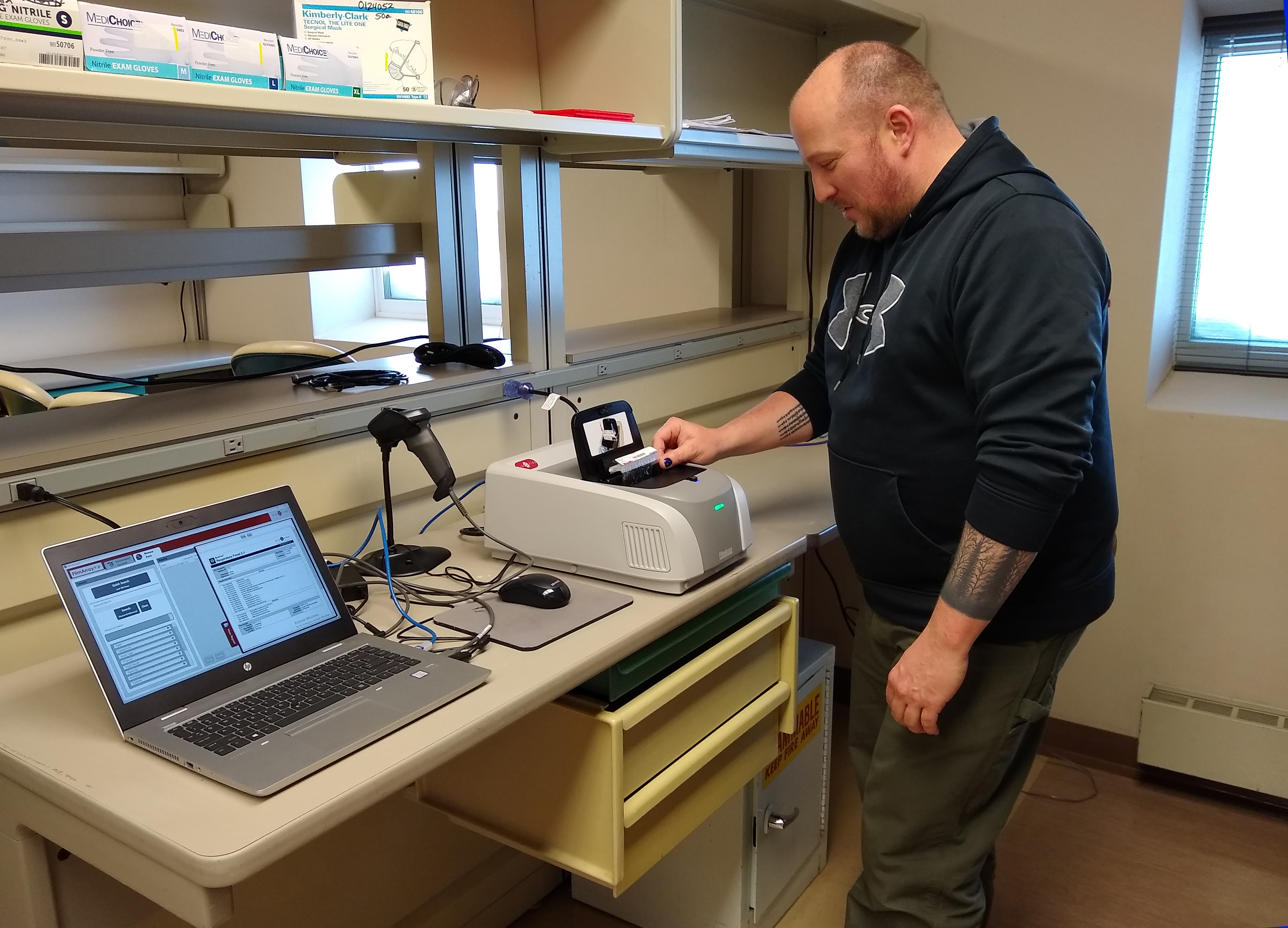
A nurse at McMurdo Station sets up the polymerase chain reaction (PCR) testing equipment, in September 2020.

On 12 January 2020, the World Health Organization (WHO) confirmed that a novel coronavirus was the cause of a respiratory illness affecting a cluster of people in Wuhan, Hubei, China, which was reported to the WHO on 31 December 2019.

The case fatality ratio for COVID-19 has been much lower than SARS of 2003, but the transmission has been significantly greater, with a significant total death toll.

== Impact on scientific research ==
People coming to Antarctica research stations have to undergo isolation and COVID-19 screening. The Antarctica research stations of Australia, Norway and Germany have respirators and coronavirus tests; it remains unconfirmed whether the research stations of the U.S. and Britain have them. The British Antarctic Survey implemented precautionary measures. The Argentine Antarctica territories had taken measures at its six permanent bases to prevent the spread of COVID-19 to the territory before the arrival of the virus.

The impact of the COVID-19 pandemic on travel caused complications with evacuating British Antarctic Survey personnel from the continent.

As of 14 April 2020, bases in Antarctica contained only skeleton crews, visitors have been limited, and scientific research has been impacted. Several conferences on the topic of Antarctica that had been planned for mid-2020 were cancelled due to the pandemic.

== Cases ==
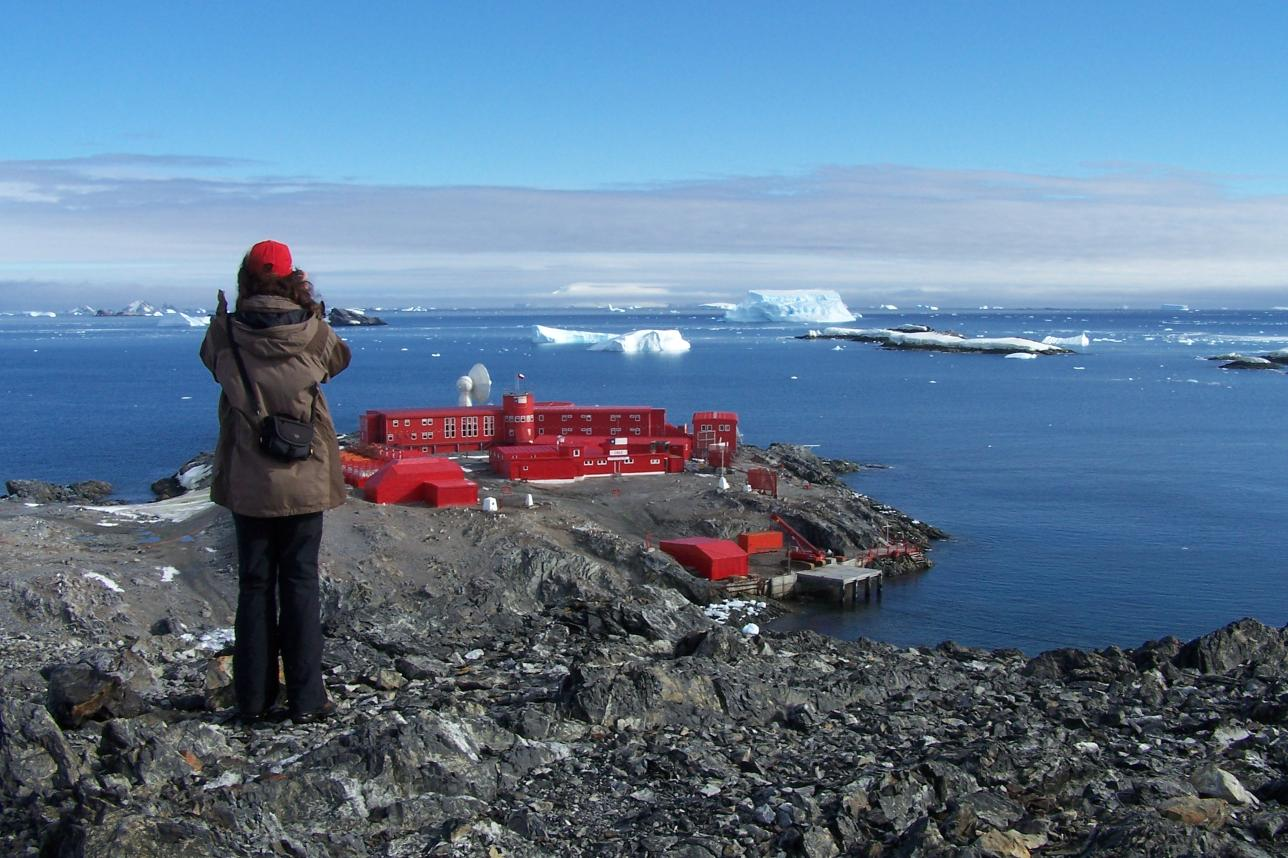
View of the Base General Bernardo O'Higgins, where the first cases of COVID-19 in Antarctica were reported.

In April 2020, a cruise ship headed for Antarctica had almost sixty percent of its passengers test positive for COVID-19. The cruise stopped in Uruguay, where the passengers were allowed to disembark.

The first official cases were announced on 21 December 2020 by the government of Chile. At least 36 people, including 10 civilians and 26 officers of the Chilean Army and Chilean Navy, were confirmed as positive for COVID-19 after contracting the virus on the Base General Bernardo O'Higgins Riquelme (in continental Antarctica), where they were doing scheduled maintenance work for the base. The people developed symptoms for COVID-19 aboard the Sargento Aldea ship, and most of the cases were treated after arriving to their destinations in Punta Arenas and Talcahuano.

On 14 December 2021, a positive case was detected at the Belgian research station Princesse Elisabeth in Queen Maud Land. Further tests revealed two more cases that were subsequently evacuated on 23 December. 11 of the 30 people present at the station were tested positive.

On 12 January 2022, 13 positive cases were detected at Esperanza Base in Argentine Antarctica. Further tests detected 11 more cases, totaling 24 positive cases.

On 13 September 2022, one positive case was detected at Davis Station in Australian Antarctic Territory. First unspecified case detected at port in Hobart on 10 January 2022.

The first confirmed case at McMurdo Station in Ross Dependency was detected in August 2022. By November, 10% of the population of the station was confirmed to be infected. As of February 2023, a total of 175 positive cases have been detected. Covid also reached Amundsen-Scott South Pole Station and WAIS Divide.

On 8 November 2022, 20 positive cases were detected at Dumont d'Urville Station in Adélie Land. 20 of the 21 people present at the station were tested positive.

Covid reached New Zealand's Scott Base, located several miles from McMurdo Station, in February 2023.

== Vaccination ==
On 18 March 2021, the Chilean Air Force announced they inoculated 49 members of their staff in Antarctica, being the first country to start vaccinating against COVID-19 in the continent.

On 7 October 2021, Astra-Zeneca vaccines arrived in Antarctica to vaccinate 23 members of staff that are working for the British Antarctic Survey in the Rothera base.

== Statistics ==
Cases by territories and sites
Territory	Site	Operating country	Cases	Historical cases	Deaths	References
Adélie Land	Dumont d'Urville Station, Cap Prud Homme	Italy, France	28	0	0	
Argentine Antarctica	Esperanza Base, Base San Martín, Base Orcadas, Estación Carini, Belgrano II, Base Marambio	Argentina	42	0	0	
Australian Antarctic Territory	Davis Station, Estación Mawson, Estación Soyuz, Druzhnaya, Zhongshán, Bharati, Vostok,	China, Russia, India, Australia	58	1	0	
British Antarctic Territory	Rothera Research Station	United Kingdom	27	0	0	
Chilean Antarctic Territory	Base General Bernardo O'Higgins Riquelme, Villa Las Estrellas	Chile	133	0	0	
Peter I Island	Sandefjord Cove	Norway	0	0	0	
Queen Maud Land	Princess Elisabeth Antarctica, SANAE IV, Estación Princesa Isabel, Estación Tor, Estación Showa	Norway, Japan, Belgium	73	0	0	
Ross Dependency	McMurdo Station, Estación Zucchelli, Base Scott	USA	125	0	0	
Marie Byrd Land	Amundsen–Scott South Pole Station	USA	8	0	0	
9/9			494	1	0	
Last update 8 February 2023.

== See also ==
- COVID-19 pandemic by country and territory
