= 2010 in Antarctica =

- Decades: 1990s; 2000s; 2010s; 2020s
- See also: Other events of 2010; Timeline of Antarctic history

This is a list of events occurring in Antarctica in 2010.

== Events ==
- January 2: An expedition finds remains of the first aeroplane brought to the continent, a single-propeller Vickers plane of explorer Douglas Mawson.
- February 28: Two huge icebergs let loose off Antarctica's coast. The two icebergs are drifting together about 62 to 93 miles (100 to 150 kilometers) off eastern Antarctica, according to an Australian Antarctic Division glaciologist.
- March 16: NASA researchers discover cold-water Lysianassidae, shrimp-like amphipods, living in the water beneath the Ross Ice Shelf.
- October 29: Three bodies are found by rescuers at a crash site involving a French helicopter.
