= Kirkby Head =

Headland in Enderby Land, Antarctica

Coordinates: 67°17′S 46°29′E

Kirkby Head is a sheer coastal outcrop on Tange Promontory in Enderby Land, Antarctica, which is claimed by Australia as part of the Australian Antarctic Territory. Continental ice reaches almost to the top on its southern side. It is located at the east side of the entrance to Alasheyev Bight.

== Discovery and naming ==
Kirkby Head was plotted from air photographs taken from an Australian National Antarctic Research Expeditions (ANARE) aircraft in 1956, and was first visited by an ANARE party led by Sydney L. Kirkby in November 1960. It was named by the Antarctic Names Committee of Australia after Kirkby, who was a surveyor at Mawson Station in 1956 and 1960.

== See also ==
- History of Antarctica
- List of Antarctic expeditions
