= 2018 in Antarctica =

- Decades: 1990s; 2000s; 2010s; 2020s
- See also: Other events of 2018; Timeline of Antarctic history

The following are events that occurred in Antarctica in 2018.

== Events ==
- January 4 - An ice drilling project near Minna Bluff is estimated to be finished on this date.
- January 25 - An ice drilling project in Ong Valley is estimated to be finished on this date.
- May 4 - Foundation Trough, Patuxent Trough, and Offset Rift Basin, canyons that divide the two major regions of the continent, is able to be seen and is mapped for the first time.
