= 2011 in Antarctica =

- Decades: 1990s; 2000s; 2010s; 2020s
- See also: Other events of 2011; Timeline of Antarctic history

This is a list of events occurring in Antarctica in 2011.

== Events ==
- 12 July: Japanese officials announce their intention to send the country's whaling fleet back to Antarctica later in the year; the Sea Shepherd Conservation Society (SSCS) is also to return.
- 14 December: The governments of the United States, Australia, New Zealand and the Netherlands protest the start of Japan's whaling season off the coast of Antarctica.
