= 2016 in Antarctica =

- Decades: 1990s; 2000s; 2010s; 2020s
- See also: Other events of 2016; Timeline of Antarctic history

The following is a list of events that occurred in Antarctica in 2016.

== Events ==
- late January – The South Pole Ice Core project, known more succinctly as SPICECORE, wrapped up its two-year drilling effort at the South Pole in late January, having exceeded even their most ambitious goals. Researchers collected ice samples from 1,751 meters (5,744 feet) below the surface, more than 200 meters (656 feet) deeper than their original target.
- February 9 – The CosRay experiment used to monitor the cosmic rays hitting the Earth since 1960 moves from McMurdo Station to the South Korean base, Jang Bango.
- March 18 – A collaboration of scientists begins using electromagnetic emissions from lightning and solar wind to study the inner workings of Mount Erebus.
- June 21 – Scientists find antibiotics in the chemical compound of the dubbed darwinolide sea sponge that may be able to be used to develop treatments against the fortified form of the most virulent antibiotic-resistant infections.
- October 5 – A helium-filled balloon carries the alabaster solar telescope, GRIPS into the sky to watch for eruptions from the Sun.
- November 11 – U.S. Secretary of State John Kerry visits McMurdo Station in order to meet with polar researchers studying a wide range of topics supported by the National Science Foundation, mostly about global warming. Kerry becomes the first secretary of state and most senior U.S. government official to visit Antarctica.
- November 15 – A C-17 cargo plane lands safely on the newly built Phoenix Airfield in McMurdo Station meaning it has passed its final test and is now ready to receive planes and passengers from the U.S. Antarctic Program's port of departure in New Zealand.
- December 28 – A massive "anomaly," 151 miles across and at a minimum depth of 2,700 feet, is confirmed to have been found by a satellite and buried deep under the ice of Wilkes Land. The gravitational changes under Wilkes Land were first spotted by NASA satellites in 2006. Scientists believe it is an asteroid bigger than the one that caused the Chicxulub crater or the actual one that killed up to 98 percent of Earth's sea creatures and up to 70 percent of vertebrates living on land.

== Climate ==
- A monitoring station in West Antarctica detected a sharp warming of the atmosphere and the presence of clouds containing a considerable amount of moisture during a strong El Niño event for 15 days in January 2016 in the Ross Ice Shelf. This caused a melt area bigger than Texas. Researchers find that there may have even been rainfall on the ice shelf in that period of time causing the surface of the ice shelf to possibly be covered with a layer of slush. However, this data was not collected and studied until June 2017.
- Antarctic sea ice sees an early maximum amount and breaks records. The ice decreases rapidly in September.
- The Southern Ocean is pulling in more carbon dioxide from the atmosphere than ever before, which could have implications on predicting the rate of climate change.

== Flora and fauna ==
- Scientists find that the Southern Ocean's food chain may be going through an existential crisis due to the waters becoming increasingly acidic.

== Deaths ==
- 22 October 2016 – Climate scientist, Gordon Hamilton, passes away on White Island in the Ross Archipelago after his snowmobile fell into a 100-foot crevasse.
