= 2015 in Antarctica =

- Decades: 1990s; 2000s; 2010s; 2020s
- See also: Other events of 2015; Timeline of Antarctic history

The following is a list of events that occurred in Antarctica in 2015.

== Events ==
- January - Reports emerge of a 2-kilometre (1.2 mi) circular structure, supposedly a meteorite crater, on the surface snow of King Baudouin Ice Shelf. Satellite images suggest that the crater is probably at least 25 years old.
- June - Norway formally defines the area covered by Queen Maud Land.
- date unknown - Antarctica Marathon
