= Alasheyev Bight =

Coastal landform in Enderby Land, Antarctica

Coordinates: 67°30′S 45°40′E

Alasheyev Bight is a bight in the western part of the coast of Enderby Land. Kirkby Head is a sheer coastal outcrop on Tange Promontory, at the east side of the entrance to Alasheyev Bight. Alasheyev Bight was photographed from the air by Australian National Antarctic Research Expeditions in 1956. Plotted in 1957 by the Soviet Antarctic Expedition and named for D.A. Alasheyev (Дмитрий Александрович Алашеев), Russian hydrographer.
