= Tange Promontory =

Peninsula in Enderby Land, Antarctica

Coordinates: 67°27′S 46°45′E

Tange Promontory is an ice-covered peninsula just west of Casey Bay on the coast of Enderby Land in Antarctica. Kirkby Head is a sheer coastal outcrop on Tange Promontory, at the east side of the entrance to Alasheyev Bight.

Tange Promontory was plotted from air photographs taken from an ANARE (Australian National Antarctic Research Expeditions) aircraft in November 1956 and mapped by the Soviet Antarctic Expedition in February 1957. Tange Promontory was named by ANCA for Sir Arthur Tange, Secretary of the Australian Department of External Affairs from 1954 to 1965.

== See also ==
- Lamykin Dome, domed feature which forms the ice-covered summit of Tange Promontory
