= 2002 in Antarctica =

- Decades: 1980s; 1990s; 2000s; 2010s; 2020s
- See also: Other events of 2002; Timeline of Antarctic history

Events in the year 2002 in the Antarctica.

== Events ==
Members of the Antarctic Treaty System officially adopt a new emblem, which would go on to be used as the flag that represented Antarctica occasionally, however; this emblem represents the Antarctic Treaty and not the continent itself.

In the first three months of the year, the 3,250 square kilometer (1,250 square mile) Larsen B Ice Shelf splintered and collapsed.
