= Casey Bay =

Body of water in Enderby Land, Antarctica

Coordinates: 67°30′S 48°0′E

Casey Bay is a large Antarctic bay indenting the coast of Enderby Land between Tange Promontory and Dingle Dome. The feature was observed from Australian National Antarctic Research Expeditions aircraft in 1956. It was named by the Antarctic Names Committee of Australia for the Rt. Hon. Richard G. Casey (later Lord Casey), Australian Minister for External Affairs, 1951–60.
