= Lamykin Dome =

Lamykin Dome (67°27′S 46°40′E) is a domed feature rising to 525 metres (1,720 ft) which forms the ice-covered summit of Tange Promontory, on the coast of Enderby Land, Antarctica. The feature was plotted on charts by the Soviet Antarctic Expedition (1957) and named for Soviet hydrographer S.M. Lamykin.
