= 2014 in Antarctica =

- Decades: 1990s; 2000s; 2010s; 2020s
- See also: Other events of 2014; Timeline of Antarctic history

This is a list of events occurring in Antarctica in 2014.

== Events ==
=== Date unknown ===
- A study conducted this year estimated that during the Pleistocene, the East Antarctic Ice Sheet (EAIS) thinned by at least 500 m (1,600 ft), and that thinning since the Last Glacial Maximum for the EAIS area is less than 50 m (160 ft) and probably started after c. 14 ka.
