= 2013 in Antarctica =

- Decades: 1990s; 2000s; 2010s; 2020s
- See also: Other events of 2013; Timeline of Antarctic history

This is a list of events occurring in Antarctica in 2013.

== Events ==
- An 18 kg (40 lb) meteorite discovered frozen in ice on the Nansen ice field in January by the Search for Antarctic Meteorites, Belgian Approach (SAMBA) mission.
- A study published in Nature Geoscience in this year identified central West Antarctica as one of the fastest-warming regions on Earth. The researchers present a complete temperature record from Antarctica's Byrd Station and assert that it "reveals a linear increase in annual temperature between 1958 and 2010 by 2.4±1.2 °C".
