= 2017 in Antarctica =

- Decades: 1990s; 2000s; 2010s; 2020s
- See also: Other events of 2017; Timeline of Antarctic history

This is a list of events occurring in Antarctica in 2017.

== Events ==
- January 4 – A machine, dubbed the "cosmic dust sucker," begins its first runs. It will be used to literally pull in cosmic dust and micrometeorites from the air in order to reduce air contamination.
- March (unknown date)
  - Scientists at McMurdo retrieve a tag that had been on a seal since December 2015 and recover data recorded in six-second intervals for a period of 448 days. This is the longest time period of which data recording was uninterrupted.
  - NASA enlisted numerous members of the McMurdo community to study the long-term cognitive effects of living in a harsh, remote environment. McMurdo was chosen as a test site due to its environmental similarity to Mars, and this study is being done to prepare for crewed missions to the Red Planet.
- March 14 – A team of researchers begin testing 108 samples of rock taken from numerous spots on Ross Island and Black Island and from the transantarctic mountains in order to track Earth's past magnetic moments.
- April 20 – After spending two months at a drilling site on the Antarctic ice sheet, researchers have retrieved a rock core for testing in order to study the ice levels over the past thousands of years.
- May 17 – An electronic tagging project to study the population and demographics of Adelie penguins around Ross Island finds that the penguin population was not decreasing, but increasing rapidly.
- June 13 – A lost 118-year old painting by British polar explorer, Dr. Edward Wilson is discovered in his abandoned hut in Cape Adare. The hut was used by Wilson in a 1911 expedition. The painting was found buried under penguin excrement and moldy papers.
- November 20 – A project that will utilize the IDDO Deep Logging Winch to log the Rapid Access Ice Drill (RAID) Antarctic field trial (AFT) borehole drilled during the 2017–2018 summer field season near Minna Bluff, Antarctica is estimated to begin on this date. The RAID AFT includes a new slim version of PI Ryan Bay's optical logging device for use in the 3.5-inch diameter RAID boreholes. The optical logger will enable rapid establishment of the ice chronology in a borehole, in a few hours after drilling. This field trial will be critical in determining whether or not the RAID borehole wall roughness, and cleanliness, permits optical logging at the level of detail needed for accurate dating of the ice. The project is estimated to last through January 4, 2018.
- December 1 -A project that will study a large body of ice that is buried beneath approximately a meter of debris in the Ong Valley of the Transantarctic Mountains of East Antarctica is estimated to begin on this date. Preliminary analyses of this material suggest that it could be over a million years old. Most glacial ice contains tiny air bubbles that have trapped the atmospheric gases and other atmospherically transported materials existing at the time that the ice was deposited such as plant pollen, microbes and mineral dust. Samples will be collected from this buried ice mass, down to a depth of 10 meters, and cosmogenic nuclide concentrations both in the overlying debris and in the till contained in the ice will be measured. The combined analysis of the target cosmogenic nuclides (Beryllium-10, Aluminum-26, and Neon-21) will allow the age of the ice to be uniquely determined and will enable determination of the rate that the ice is sublimating. The project is estimated to last through January 25, 2018.

== Climate ==
- A survey finds that Antarctica is more covered with meltwater than previously thought.
- A team of scientists who spent two seasons on Mount Erebus to better understand the plumes of gas coming out from the mountain discovers that some isotopic carbon dioxide gas is coming from a source that is below the Earth's surface.
- A 100-mile-long rift in the Larsen C Ice Shelf is set to break off into an iceberg the size of Rhode Island in between 2017 and 2020.
- It is discovered that a monitoring station in West Antarctica detected a sharp warming of the atmosphere and the presence of clouds containing a considerable amount of moisture during a strong El Niño event for 15 days in January 2016 in the Ross Ice Shelf. This caused a melt area bigger than Texas. Researchers find that there may have even been rainfall on the ice shelf in that period of time causing the surface of the ice shelf to possibly be covered with a layer of slush.
- A study finds that the ice-free areas of Antarctica could expand up to 17,000 sq km by 2100 due to greenhouse gas emissions, potentially harming the continent's unique species of animals.

== Flora and fauna ==
- Scientists discover that the moss on Green Island has grown more than usual in the past five decades and is becoming a problem.
- A new invasive species, the common house fly begins to become a problem as they are now colonizing coastal areas of the continent.
