= 2019 in Antarctica =

- Decades: 1990s; 2000s; 2010s; 2020s
- See also: Other events of 2019; Timeline of Antarctic history

Events from the year 2019 in Antarctica.

== Events ==
=== June ===
- Gaping holes found winter ice packs, which previously had been without explanation is found to most likely be caused by storms and salt with new research.

=== July ===
- Scientists from the University College London and the British Antarctic Survey discover that a snow covered volcano on Mount Michael on Saunders Island in the South Sandwich Islands contains a lake of lava within its crater. It is only the eighth lake of molten rock found on Earth so far.

== Climate ==
- A 100 mile long (250 kilometers) iceberg called A-68, which broke off of the Larsen C Ice Shelf on July 12, 2017, has drifted 155 miles (250 kilometers) from the ice shelf during the first two years of it breaking off.
