= 2012 in Antarctica =

- Decades: 1990s; 2000s; 2010s; 2020s
- See also: Other events of 2012; Timeline of Antarctic history

This is a list of events occurring in Antarctica in 2012.

== Events ==
- 24 January: A fire forces the evacuation of the Comandante Ferraz Brazilian Antarctic Base with two people dying.
- 5 March: The Sea Shepherd anti-whaling organisation claims to have closed down Japan's main whaling ship, the Nisshin Maru, deep inside the Southern Ocean off the Antarctic coast.
- 20 September: Data from the University of Illinois at Urbana–Champaign shows the Antarctic ice sheet reached its seventh-largest extent on September 12, at 16.14 million km^{2}.
- 18 October: A fictional feature film, called South of Sanity, is shot in Antarctica for the first time.
- 26 November: Scientists have found life in an Antarctic Lake Vida that was sealed off from the outside world by a thick sheet of ice several thousands of years ago.
- 12 December: A British research team launches a long-awaited project to hunt for life in Lake Ellsworth hidden beneath the ice-sheet in Antarctica.
