= 2008 in Antarctica =

- Decades: 1980s; 1990s; 2000s; 2010s; 2020s
- See also: Other events of 2008; Timeline of Antarctic history

Events from the year 2008 in Antarctica

== Events ==
- January - The British Antarctic Survey (BAS) scientists, led by Hugh Corr and David Vaughan, reported (in the journal Nature Geoscience) that 2,000 years ago, a volcano erupted under Antarctica's ice sheet (based on airborne survey with radar images).
- February 7: A NASA team embarks on a mission to Lake Untersee, searching for extremophiles in its highly alkaline waters.
