= 2007 in Antarctica =

- Decades: 1980s; 1990s; 2000s; 2010s; 2020s
- See also: Other events of 2007; Timeline of Antarctic history

Events from the year 2007 in Antarctica

== Events ==
=== February ===
- February 15: Chris Ellison, the Australian Minister for Justice, warns anti-whaling protesters and the Japanese whaling fleet that they could face questioning over recent clashes in the Southern Ocean. Meanwhile, the crew were evacuated from the largest ship in the Japanese Antarctic fleet, the Nisshin Maru, following a fire.
- February 16: Scientists find over 20 new species of animals as the Larsen Ice Shelf breaks in the Antarctic.

=== May ===
- May 7: Discovery is announced of the Kerguelen Plateau, an Antarctic sunken large island formerly joined to India, from the icebreaker Polarstern at its homeport of Bremerhaven, Germany, after a 19-month research voyage to Antarctica.

=== June ===
- June 5: The British Antarctic Survey announces that the flow-rate of 300 previously unmeasured glaciers increased by 12% between 1993 and 2003, adding to concerns over glacier retreat and the rise in sea levels caused by global warming.
