= History of Antarctica =

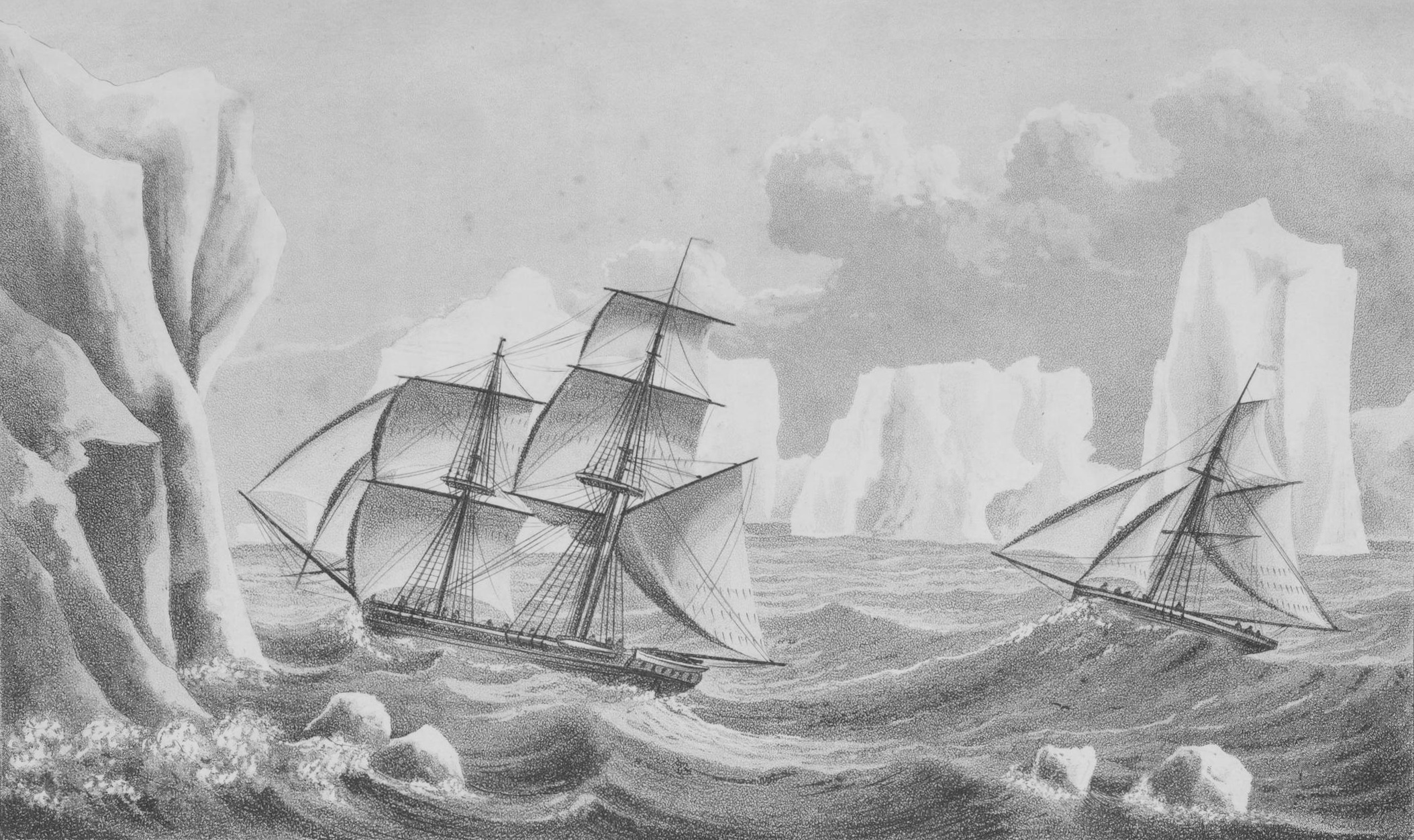
Painting of James Weddell's second expedition, depicting the brig Jane and the cutter Beaufoy

The history of Antarctica emerges from early Western theories of a vast continent, known as Terra Australis, believed to exist in the far south of the globe. The term Antarctic, referring to the opposite of the Arctic Circle, was coined by Marinus of Tyre in the 2nd century AD.

The rounding of the Cape of Good Hope and Cape Horn in the 15th and 16th centuries proved that Terra Australis Incognita ("Unknown Southern Land"), if it existed, was a continent in its own right. In 1773, James Cook and his crew crossed the Antarctic Circle for the first time. Although he discovered new islands, he did not sight the continent itself. It is believed that he came as close as 240 km (150 mi) from the mainland.

Exploration of the region began after William Smith accidentally discovered the South Shetland Islands on 19 February 1819. The following summer, at the turn of 1819 and 1820, the far south was visited by several ships, mainly sealers, but also by Edward Bransfield, a representative of the British Empire, and the First Russian Antarctic Expedition, which is credited with the earliest, albeit unconscious, sighting of the continent. The search for new seal colonies led to the discovery of several more areas of land, but it was only the data collected by three national expeditions led by Charles Wilkes, Jules Dumont d'Urville and James Clark Ross in 1840 that confirmed the existence of the continent. In the twenty years following Ross' return, there was a general lull internationally in Antarctic exploration.

The exploration of Antarctica was resumed in the 1870s, and subsequent expeditions gradually moved from being commercial-scientific to being characteristic of the heroic age. The culmination of this era is considered to be the race to the South Pole achieved by Roald Amundsen and Robert Falcon Scott, which ended with Amundsen's conquest of the pole on 14 December 1911 and the death of Scott's group on the way back. The Shackleton–Rowett Expedition, which ended in 1922, is considered the last expedition of the Heroic Age, after which exploration became increasingly technology-based. In the 1950s, the most famous permanent bases were built, such as Mawson, McMurdo, Amundsen–Scott, and Mirny.

The International Geophysical Year was pivotal in establishing a cooperative international framework in Antarctica, and led on to the Antarctic Treaty System in 1959.

== Early exploration ==
=== The search for Terra Australis Incognita ===
In 1570, a rudimentary map by Ortelius showed the imagined link between the proposed continent of Antarctica and South America. Note also the proposed landmasses surrounding the North Pole.

Aristotle speculated, "Now since there must be a region bearing the same relation to the southern pole as the place we live in bears to our pole...".

It was not until Prince Henry the Navigator began in 1418 to encourage the penetration of the torrid zone in the effort to reach India by circumnavigating Africa that European exploration of the southern hemisphere began. In 1473, Portuguese navigator Lopes Gonçalves proved that the equator could be crossed, and cartographers and sailors began to assume the existence of another, temperate continent to the south of the known world.

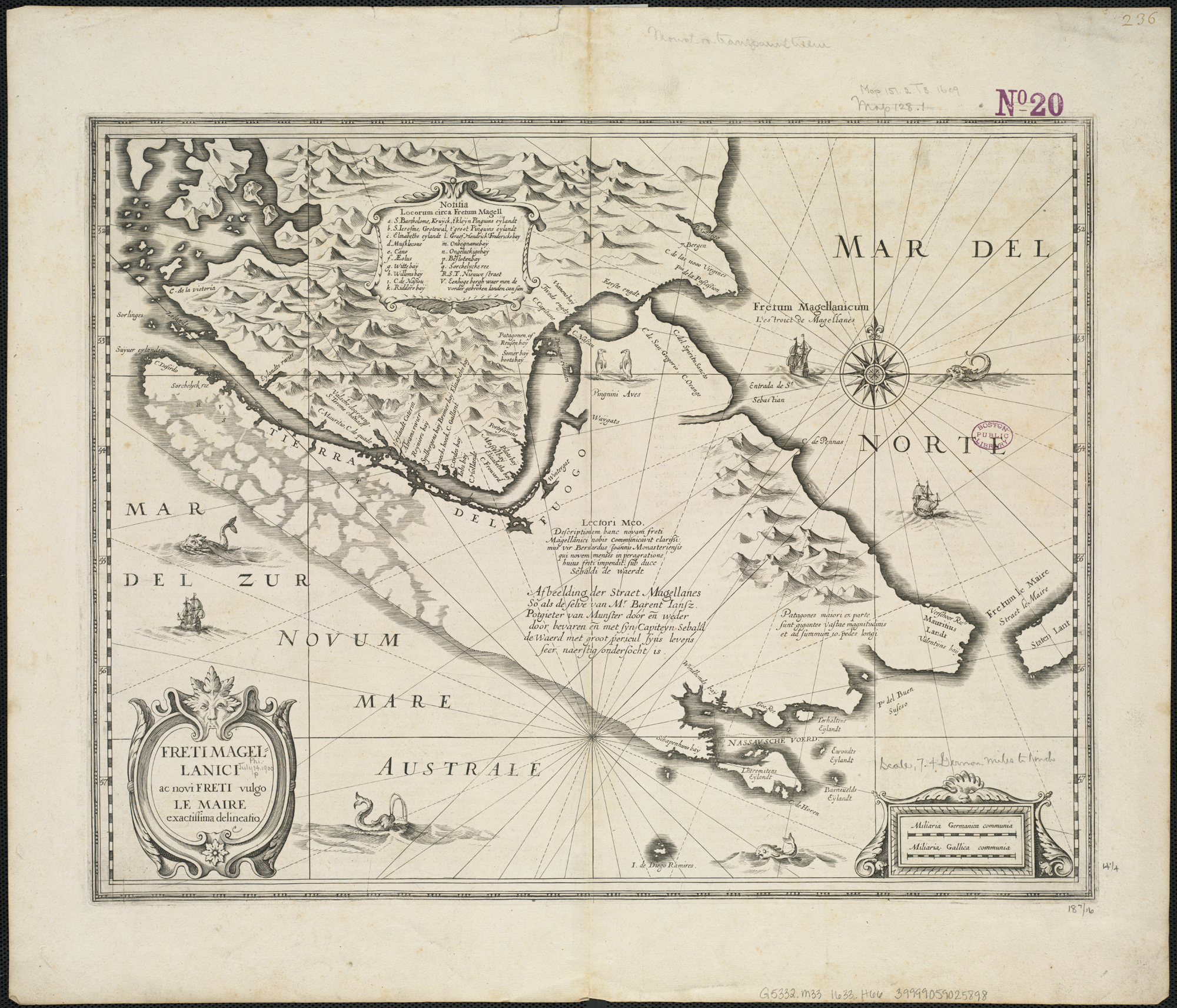
"The Magellan Strait and the new strait commonly known as Le Maire." 1633's map of Strait of Magellan, showing Strait Le Maire at the right, marked Fretum le Maire (Latin) and Straet Le Maire (Dutch)

The doubling of the Cape of Good Hope in 1487 by Bartolomeu Dias first brought explorers within touch of the Antarctic cold, and proved that there was an ocean separating Africa from any Antarctic land that might exist.

Ferdinand Magellan, who passed through the Straits of Magellan in 1520, assumed that the islands of Tierra del Fuego to the south were an extension of this unknown southern land, and it appeared as such on a map by Ortelius: Terra australis recenter inventa sed nondum plene cognita ("Southern land recently discovered but not yet fully known").

Map of the Spanish governorate of Terra Australis (1539–1555); later it was incorporated into the Governorate of Chile.

In 1539, the King of Spain, Charles V, created the Governorate of Terra Australis granted to Pedro Sancho de la Hoz, who in 1540 transferred the title to the conqueror Pedro de Valdivia and later was incorporated to Chile.

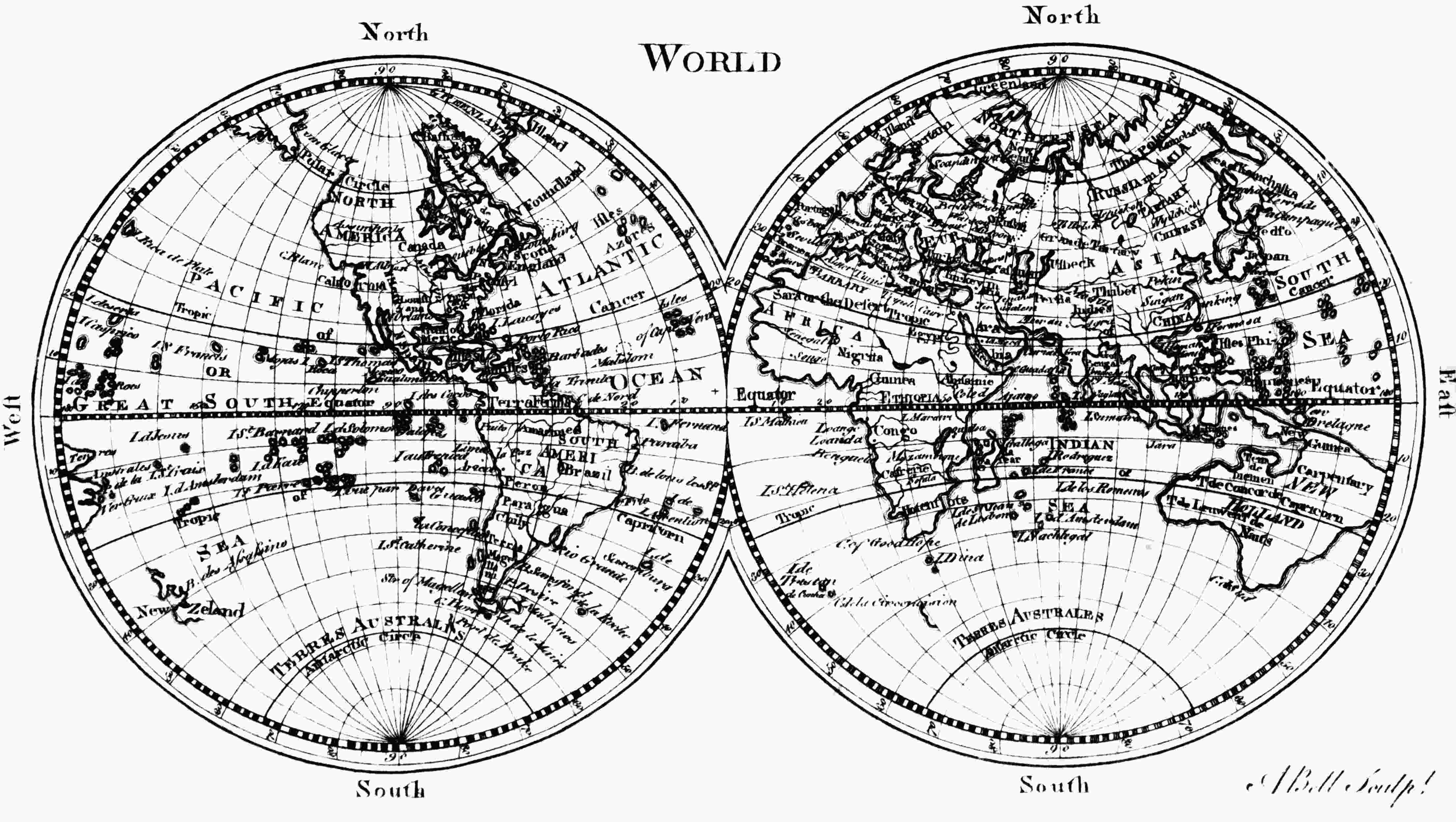
Map from 1771, showing "Terres Australes" label without any charted landmass

European geographers connected the coast of Tierra del Fuego with the coast of New Guinea on their globes, and allowing their imaginations to run riot in the vast unknown spaces of the south Atlantic, south Indian Ocean and Pacific Ocean, they sketched the outlines of the Terra Australis Incognita ("Unknown Southern Land"), a vast continent stretching in parts into the tropics. The search for this great south land or Third World was a leading motive of explorers in the 16th and the early part of the 17th centuries.

In 1599, according to the account of Jacob Le Maire, the blown off course Dutch Dirck Gerritsz Pomp observed mountainous land at latitude (64°). If so, these were the South Shetland Islands, and possibly the first European sighting of Antarctica (or offshore-lying islands belonging to it). Other accounts, however, do not note this observation, casting doubt on their accuracy. A similar incident happened to the Spaniard Gabriel de Castilla claimed to have sighted "snow-covered mountains" beyond the 64° S in 1603. Both of these potential discoveries had no consequences. Before the construction of the Panama Canal, the passages around Tierra del Fuego, notorious for their harsh weather, served as the primary route between the Atlantic and Pacific Oceans. Many ships navigating this route reported drifting off course beyond the 60th parallel, yet no land was ever sighted.

Quirós, in 1606, took possession for the king of Spain all of the lands he had discovered in Australia del Espiritu Santo (the New Hebrides) and those he would discover "even to the Pole".

Francis Drake, like Spanish explorers before him, had speculated that there might be an open channel south of Tierra del Fuego. Indeed, when Schouten and Le Maire discovered the southern extremity of Tierra del Fuego and named it Cape Horn in 1615, they proved that the Tierra del Fuego archipelago was of small extent and not connected to the southern land.

Finally, in 1642, Tasman showed that even New Holland was separated by sea from any continuous southern continent. Voyagers round the Horn frequently met with contrary winds and were driven southward into snowy skies and ice-encumbered seas; but, so far as can be ascertained, none of them before 1770 reached the Antarctic Circle, or knew it, if they did.

The Dutch expedition to Valdivia of 1643 intended to round Cape Horn sailing through Le Maire Strait but strong winds made it instead drift south and east. Northerly winds pushed the expedition as far south as 61°59 S where icebergs were abundant before a southerly wind that begun on April 7 allowed the fleet to advance west. The small fleet led by Hendrik Brouwer managed to enter the Pacific Ocean sailing south of Isla de los Estados disproving earlier beliefs that it was part of Terra Australis.

=== South of the Antarctic Convergence ===
The visit to South Georgia by the English merchant Anthony de la Roché in 1675 was the first ever discovery of land south of the Antarctic Convergence. Soon after the voyage cartographers started to depict 'Roché Island', honouring the discoverer.

James Cook was aware of La Roché's discovery when surveying and mapping the island in 1775.

Edmond Halley's voyage in HMS Paramour for magnetic investigations in the South Atlantic met the pack ice in 52° S in January 1700, but that latitude (he reached 140 mi or 230 km off the north coast of South Georgia) was his farthest south. A determined effort on the part of the French naval officer Jean-Baptiste Charles Bouvet de Lozier to discover the "South Land" – described by a half legendary "sieur de Gonneyville" – resulted in the discovery of Bouvet Island in 54°10′ S, and in the navigation of 48° of longitude of ice-cumbered sea nearly in 55° S in 1739.

In 1771, Yves Joseph Kerguelen sailed from France with instructions to proceed south from Mauritius in search of "a very large continent." He lighted upon a land in 50° S which he called South France, and believed to be the central mass of the southern continent. He was sent out again to complete the exploration of the new land, and found it to be only an inhospitable island which he renamed the Isle of Desolation, but which was ultimately named after him.

=== The Antarctic Circle ===
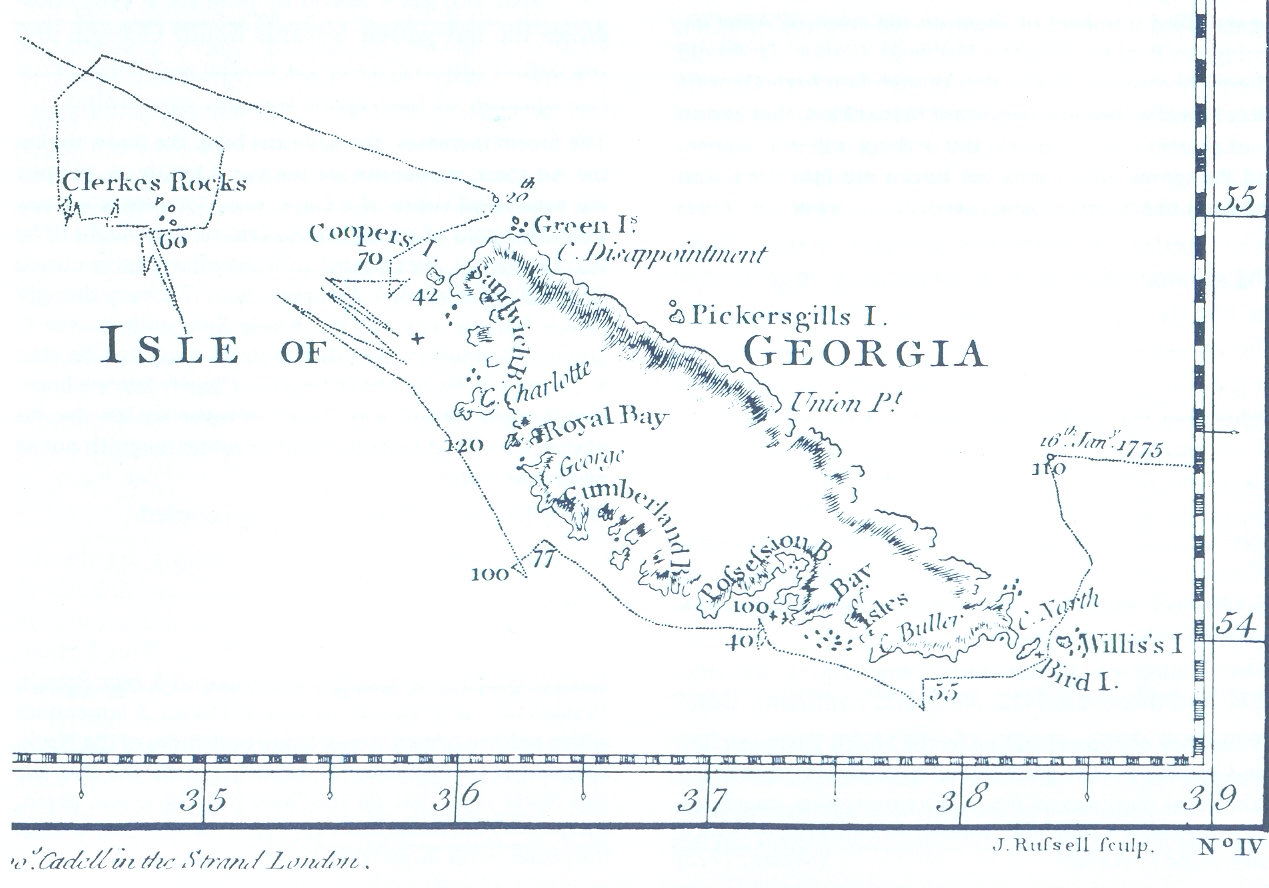
James Cook's 1777 south-up map of South Georgia

The obsession of the undiscovered continent culminated in the brain of Alexander Dalrymple, the brilliant and erratic hydrographer who was nominated by the Royal Society to command the Transit of Venus expedition to Tahiti in 1769. The command of the expedition was given by the admiralty to Captain James Cook. Sailing in 1772 with the Resolution, a vessel of 462 tons under his own command and the Adventure of 336 tons under Captain Tobias Furneaux, Cook first searched in vain for Bouvet Island, then sailed for 20 degrees of longitude to the westward in latitude 58° S, and then 30° eastward for the most part south of 60° S, a higher southern latitude than had ever been voluntarily entered before by any vessel. On 17 January 1773 the Antarctic Circle was crossed for the first time in history and the two ships reached 67° 15' S by 39° 35' E, where their course was stopped by ice.

Cook then turned northward to look for French Southern and Antarctic Lands, of the discovery of which he had received news at Cape Town, but from the rough determination of his longitude by Kerguelen, Cook reached the assigned latitude 10° too far east and did not see it. He turned south again and was stopped by ice in 61° 52′ S by 95° E and continued eastward nearly on the parallel of 60° S to 147° E. On 16 March, the approaching winter drove him northward for rest to New Zealand and the tropical islands of the Pacific. In November 1773, Cook left New Zealand, having parted company with the Adventure, and reached 60° S by 177° W, whence he sailed eastward keeping as far south as the floating ice allowed. The Antarctic Circle was crossed on 20 December and Cook remained south of it for three days, being compelled after reaching 67° 31′ S to stand north again in 135° W.

A long detour to 47° 50′ S served to show that there was no land connection between New Zealand and Tierra del Fuego. Turning south again, Cook crossed the Antarctic Circle for the third time at 109° 30′ W before his progress was once again blocked by ice four days later at 71° 10′ S by 106° 54′ W. This point, reached on 30 January 1774, was the farthest south attained in the 18th century. With a great detour to the east, almost to the coast of South America, the expedition regained Tahiti for refreshment. In November 1774, Cook started from New Zealand and crossed the South Pacific without sighting land between 53° and 57° S to Tierra del Fuego; then, passing Cape Horn on 29 December, he rediscovered Roché Island renaming it Isle of Georgia, and discovered the South Sandwich Islands (named Sandwich Land by him), the only ice-clad land he had seen, before crossing the South Atlantic to the Cape of Good Hope between 55° and 60°. He thereby laid open the way for future Antarctic exploration by exploding the myth of a habitable southern continent. Cook's most southerly discovery of land lay on the temperate side of the 60th parallel, and he convinced himself that if land lay farther south it was practically inaccessible and of no economic value.

=== Discovery of the South Shetland Islands (1819) ===
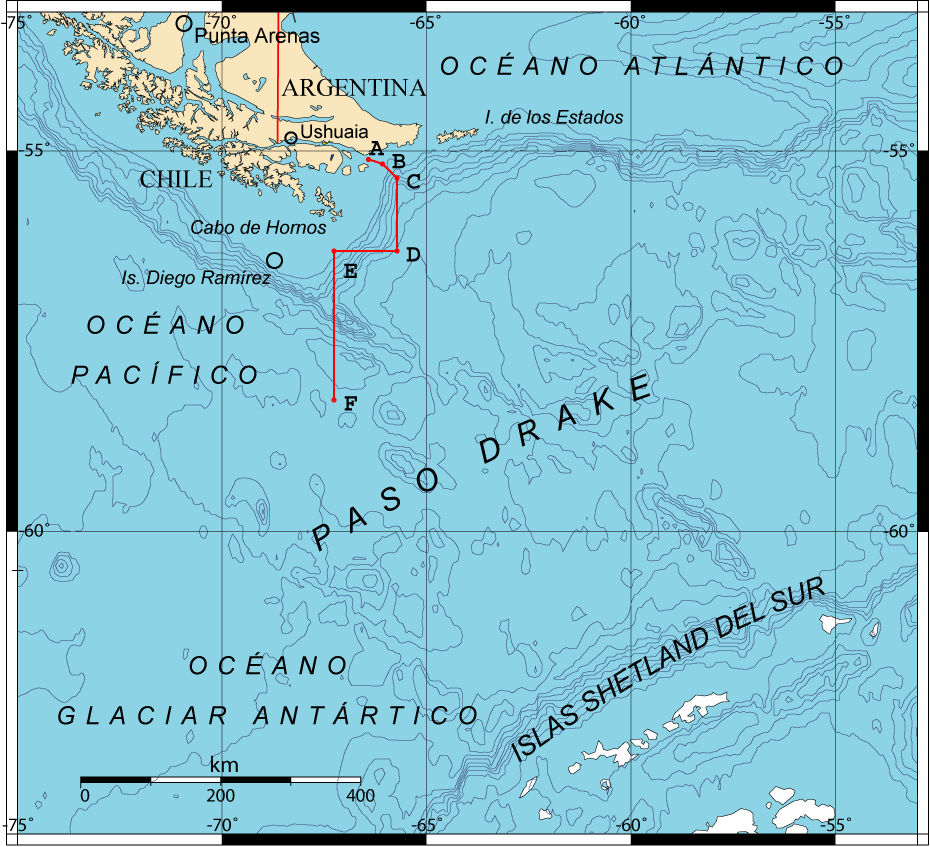
Drake Passage map

The first land south of the parallel 60° south latitude was documented by captain of the cargo ship Williams, Englishman William Smith, who sighted Livingston Island in the South Shetlands archipelago on 19 February 1819 but did not land on it. Smith was blown off course to the south while en route to Valparaíso. On reaching Valparaíso, Smith reported his discovery of the islands and the abundance of seals there, to Captain William Henry Shirreff, of HMS Andromache, which had arrived there about 5 September 1818. Smith was unable to visit the islands again while his return to the Atlantic.

In October 1819, Smith revisited the South Shetlands, landing on King George Island on 16 October and claimed the new territories for Britain. On 24 November, Williams was back at Valparaíso from Monte Video. At the beginning of the following year, 1820, the Royal Navy chartered Williams and dispatched with her with Lieutenant Edward Bransfield on board to survey the newly discovered islands and formally claim them for Great Britain, because Smith was a civilian and his October declaration had no legal force.

Before Bransfield's expedition reached its destination, sealer and Smith's navigator from the previous expedition, Joseph Herring, landed on Rugged Island. The second confirmed ship present in the South Shetlands at this time was the American Hersilia. The Americans learned of the new land from the crew of the Espirito Santo, Joseph Herring's ship, that they met on the Falklands.

==== San Telmo ====
On September 2, 1819, the Spanish ship San Telmo was lost in a storm in the Drake Passage. There were 644 people on board, including soldiers who were supposed to support Spanish forces in Peru. There is speculation that the ship may have sunk near the South Shetland Islands, and even left survivors there. On the Half Moon Beach next to the Doctor Guillermo Mann Base stands a plaque commemorating the sinking of the San Telmo.

It is believed that William Smith found the remains of San Telmo on Livingston Island, but Smith himself never mentioned it and the information is second-hand. There is also uncertainty about where the wreck was actually discovered. Smith landed on Livingston Island only during his fifth voyage to the archipelago, after the expedition commanded by Bransfield. One possible explanation for this discrepancy is that Smith named a bay on King George Island 'Shirreff Bay,' but on a subsequent expedition, Bransfield did not confirm this name in the official records, as he had already named a location 'Cape Shirreff' on Livingston Island. There are doubts as to whether the modest remains were related to San Telmo. During the first season at the turn of 1820 and 1821, four sealing ships were wrecked on the islands.

=== First sighting of the continent (1820) ===
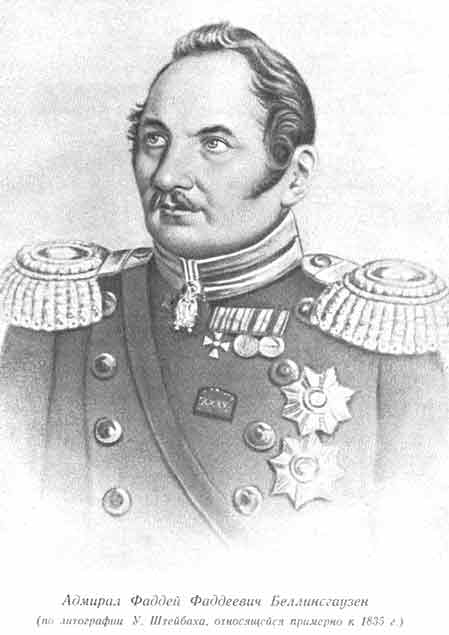
Admiral Fabian Gottlieb von Bellingshausen was one of the first to spot the continent of Antarctica.

The first generally recognized sighting of the Antarctic continent was made at a point within 32 km (20 mi) of the Princess Martha Coast on 27 or 28 January 1820. The Russian expedition led by Fabian Gottlieb von Bellingshausen and Mikhail Lazarev, on the ships Vostok and Mirny. The discovery was described with the problematic term "matyoroy lyod" (Russian: матёрой лёд) which can be translated as "hard ice".

The route of this expedition was eastward, as far south as the ice conditions permitted. Two more observations were made, and then, because of the approach of winter, they proceeded to Sydney. While in Australia, Bellingshausen wrote a report in which he stated that the southern continent probably did not exist, meaning that he did not consider the earlier observations to be a continent. When Vostok and Mirny returned to the Antarctic Circle the following summer, they continued eastward, discovering Peter I Island and Alexander I Island, although the latter was considered part of the Antarctic Peninsula until 1940. They then sailed north along the Antarctic Peninsula and reached the South Shetland Islands, where on 5 February 1821, near Deception Island, they encountered Hero, commanded by Nathaniel Palmer, previously second mate of the Hersilia.

Meanwhile, on 30 January 1820, Edward Bransfield and William Smith sighted Trinity Peninsula, the northernmost point of the Antarctic mainland.

=== Early exploration ===
==== Sealing expeditions ====
In the years since the discovery of the South Shetland Islands, there have been many sealing expeditions to the area. Most of them have been poorly documented and non-scientific. In the 1950s, the notes of John Davis, captain of Cecilia, one of the ships present there, were discovered. Davis described in them the probably first landing on the continent, which was made by his crew on 7 February 1821.

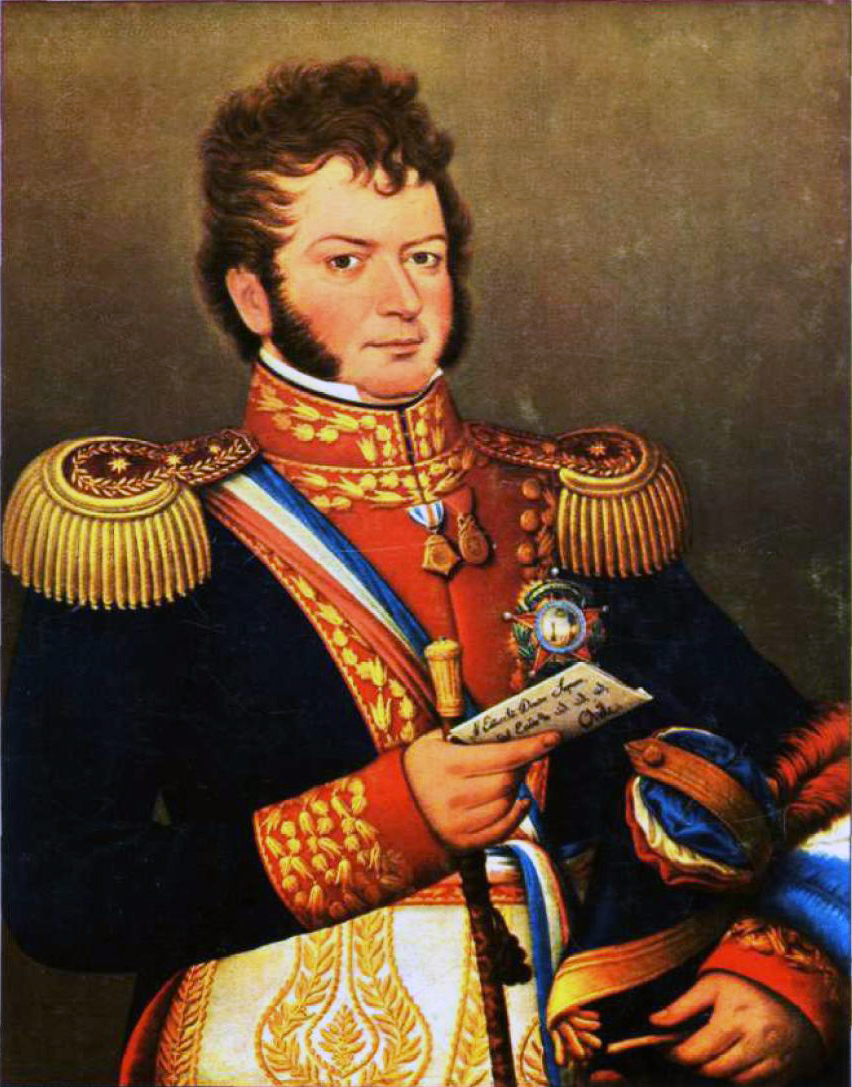
Bernardo O'Higgins as Supreme Director of Chile appointed Andrew MacFarlane, a former lieutenant in the Chilean Navy, to hunt sea lions; he landed under the Chilean flag on the Antarctic Peninsula for that purpose, being possibly the discoverer of the Antarctic continental territory.

In 1820, Supreme Director of Chile Bernardo O'Higgins authorised the Scottish merchant Andrew MacFarlane, a former lieutenant in the Chilean Navy who had taken part in the Capture of Valdivia, to command the brig Dragón de Valparaíso on a sealing expedition to the South Shetland Islands. MacFarlane, an experienced merchant captain of about forty, had arrived in Chile in mid-1819 and had been hired by the government as a naval officer. The ship, formerly the Dragon of Liverpool, had been bought by Valparaíso merchants, and it sailed from that port on 12 September 1820 using the Chilean flag. British captain Robert Fildes of the brig Cora met MacFarlane on Deception Island on 16 December 1820. According to Fildes's journal, MacFarlane told him "that he had landed there", on the land south of the island, and had found leopard seals and elephant seals. On the basis of this account, several Chilean authors argue that this was the first recorded landing on the Antarctic continent. It would have taken place on the western side of the Antarctic Peninsula between mid-October and mid-December 1820, earlier than the landing traditionally credited to the American John Davis in February 1821.

Of the sealers, the most creditable for the exploration of the coast was captain of Hero, Nathaniel Palmer. The crew of Hero were the second in history to sight the Antarctic Peninsula, located between 55 and 80 degrees west. Along with English sealer George Powell, Palmer also co-discovered the nearby South Orkney Islands archipelago.

In 1823, James Weddell, a British sealer, sailed into what is now known as the Weddell Sea. Weddell found very favorable ice conditions there, which allowed him to set a record for the furthest south. Since no land was encountered during the entire voyage, Weddell assumed that the ocean extended to the pole and that there was no continent to the south, only an archipelago.

A piece of wood, from the South Shetland Islands, was the first fossil ever recorded from Antarctica, obtained during a private United States expedition during 1829–31, commanded by Captain Benjamin Pendleton.

As the seal population declined, interest in the region waned. However, the search for new seal colonies led to isolated discoveries, such as the discovery of Enderby Land by John Biscoe in February 1831, discovery of Kemp Land by Peter Kemp in 1833 and discovery of Balleny Islands by John Balleny in 1839.

==== State expeditions 1840 ====
In the late 1830s, interest in the far South increased again, resulting in the organisation of three national scientific expeditions during that period. At that time it was still unclear whether there was a continent there or just ice-bound islands.

The first to set off in 1837 was a French expedition led by naval officer Jules Dumont d'Urville. After reaching the Antarctic Circle, Astrolabe and Zélée sailed into the Weddel Sea where they failed to repeat James Weddel's feat. At the turn of February and March 1838 the expedition was already in Bransfield Strait, where it had mapped part of the northern tip of the Antarctic Peninsula, which it named the Louis Philippe Land. In early 1840 a French expedition returned to the Antarctic Circle having sailed from Australia. The two ships reached the north-westernmost and highest islet of the rocky group of Dumoulin Islands, at 500–600 m from the icy coast of the Astrolabe Glacier Tongue of the time, today about 4 km north from the glacier extremity near Cape Géodésie, and hoisted the French tricolour. Dumont named the archipelago Pointe Géologie and the land beyond, Adélie Land (Note: Alors, j'annonçais aux officiers rassemblés en présence de l'équipage que cette terre porterait désormais le nom de terre Adélie. Cette désignation est destinée à perpétuer le souvenir de ma profonde reconnaissance pour la compagne dévouée qui a su par trois fois consentir à une séparation longue et douloureuse, pour me permettre d'accomplir mes projets d'explorations lointaines. (Then, I announced to the officers gathered in the presence of the crew that this land would carry from now on the name of Terre Adélie. This name is intended to perpetuate the memory of my deep recognition for my devoted partner who agreed three times to long and painful separations, to enable me to carry out my plans for remote explorations.)) The map of the coast drawn under sail by the hydrographer Clément Adrien Vincendon-Dumoulin is remarkably accurate given the means of the time.

Charles Wilkes, as commander of a United States Navy expedition in 1840, discovered what is now known as Wilkes Land, a section of the continent around 120 degrees East.

Both expeditions operated in the same region and time, leading to disputed claims of priority of discovery. Dumont d'Urville reached the Adelie Land, on 21 or 22 January 1840. Wilkes, on the other hand, claimed to have discovered the same area, which he named "Wilkes Land", on 16 January 1840, from a greater distance. The differences in dates and the uncertainties regarding the exact locations of the discoveries led to a rivalry for prestige between France and the United States over who was to be the first to discover the Antarctic continent.

After the North magnetic pole was located in 1831, explorers and scientists began looking for the South magnetic pole. One of the explorers, James Clark Ross, a British naval officer, identified its approximate location, but was unable to reach it on his 4 year-expedition from 1839 to 1843. Commanding the British ships Erebus and Terror, he braved the pack ice and approached what is now known as the Ross Ice Shelf, a massive floating ice shelf over 100 feet (30 m) high. His expedition sailed eastward along the southern Antarctic coast discovering mountains which were since named after his ships: Mount Erebus, the most active volcano on Antarctica, and Mount Terror.

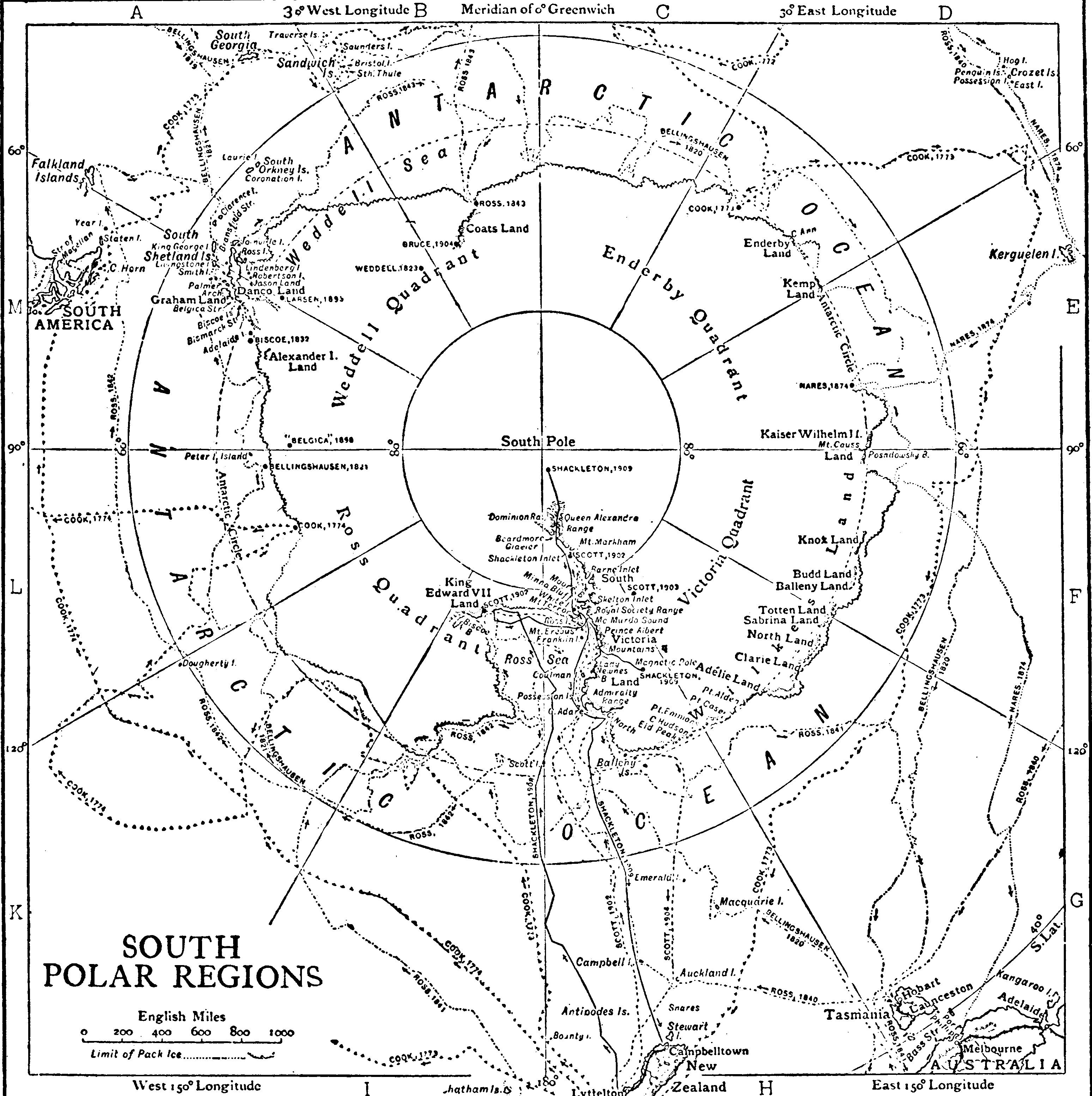
Map of exploration routes, 1911

These explorers, despite their impressive contributions to South Polar exploration, were unable to penetrate the interior of the continent and, rather, formed a broken line of discovered lands along the coastline of Antarctica. Following the expedition south by the ships Erebus and Terror, James Clark Ross (January, 1841) suggested that there were no scientific discoveries, or 'problems', worth exploration in the far South. What followed is what historian H.R. Mill called 'the age of averted interest' and in the following twenty years after Ross' return, there was a general lull internationally in Antarctic exploration.

=== History of recognition of priority of discoveries ===
In the second half of the 19th century, one of the commanders of the research expeditions from around 1840 was considered to be the discoverer of Antarctica. In Europe, Jules Dumont d'Urville was usually considered, while in America, Charles Wilkes. Wilkes's priority was challenged due to his changing the reported date of his first sighting of the continent twice. The first observation of the land by an American expedition took place on 16 January 1840, from the deck of the USS Peacock and was supposed to involve distant observation of Eld Peak and Reynolds Peak along the George V Coast. The prevailing view at the time was that the sighting of January 16 and the sighting of January 19 were fabrications, made after d'Urville announced his own sighting of the continent on the evening 19 January. (Note: Instead of 20 January 1840, since Dumont d'Urville did not add one day on his diary when he passed the 180° meridian from the east, (in French) Proposition de classement du rocher du débarquement dans le cadre des sites et monuments historiques, Antarctic Treaty Consultative meeting 2006, note 4 Archived 11 August 2013 at the Wayback Machine)

By the early 20th century, efforts began to promote Nathaniel Palmer's 1820 expedition, which sighted the Antarctic Peninsula in November of that year.

At the 1925 the priority of Edward Bransfield's expedition, which had mapped the South Shetland Islands and sighted the Trinity Peninsula on 30 January 1820, began to be promoted in Britain.

The first Russian Antarctic Expedition remained largely forgotten until 10 February 1949, when Lev Berg, president of the Soviet Geographical Society, presented a report stating that Russian sailors had 'discovered Peter I Island, Alexander Island, Traversay Islands, and others in 1821.' This raised questions about the Russian and Soviet role in Antarctic exploration and the scientific research surrounding the discovery of the continent. Shortly thereafter, expedition documents were reexamined. Based on a letter written by Mikhail Lazarev to a friend after the expedition, it was concluded that an ice shelf, which Lazarev described as 'materyi led' (translated as 'hard ice'), was sighted on 28 (Note: 16 according to the Julian calendar used in Russia.) January 1820. However, there is some uncertainty regarding Lazarev's accuracy in recalling the chronology of events.

== Heroic Age of Antarctic Exploration ==
The first documented landing on the mainland of East Antarctica was at Victoria Land by the American sealer Mercator Cooper on 26 January 1853.

The Heroic Age of Antarctic Exploration began at the end of the 19th century and closed with Ernest Shackleton's Imperial Trans-Antarctic Expedition in 1917.

During this period the Antarctic continent became the focus of an international effort that resulted in intensive scientific and geographical exploration and in which 17 major Antarctic expeditions were launched from ten countries.

=== Origins ===
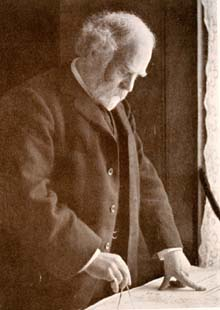
The Canadian-born oceanographer Dr John Murray was the driving force behind the renewal of interest in Antarctic exploration at the beginning of the 20th century.

An important precursor to the Heroic Age of Antarctic exploration was the Dundee Antarctic Expedition of 1892–93 in which four Dundee whaling ships travelled south to the Antarctic in search of whales instead of their usual Arctic route. The expedition was accompanied by several naturalists (including William Speirs Bruce) and an artist, William Gordon Burn Murdoch. The publications (both scientific and popular) and exhibitions that resulted did much to reignite public interest in the Antarctic. The performance of the whaling ships was also crucial in the decision to build the RRS Discovery in Dundee.

Following on from that expedition, the specific impetus for the Heroic Age of Antarctic Exploration was a lecture given by Dr John Murray entitled "The Renewal of Antarctic Exploration", given to the Royal Geographical Society in London, 27 November 1893. Murray advocated that research into the Antarctic should be organised to "resolve the outstanding geographical questions still posed in the south". Furthermore, the Royal Geographical Society instated an Antarctic Committee shortly prior to this, in 1887, which successfully encouraged many whalers to explore the Southern regions of the world and laid the groundwork for the lecture given by Murray.

The Norwegian ship Antarctic was put ashore at Cape Adare, on 24 January 1895.

In August 1895 the Sixth International Geographical Congress in London passed a general resolution calling on scientific societies throughout the world to promote the cause of Antarctic exploration "in whatever ways seem to them most effective". Such work would "bring additions to almost every branch of science". The Congress had been addressed by the Norwegian Carsten Borchgrevink, who had just returned from a whaling expedition during which he had become one of the first to set foot on the Antarctic mainland. During his address, Borchgrevink outlined plans for a full-scale pioneering Antarctic expedition, to be based at Cape Adare.

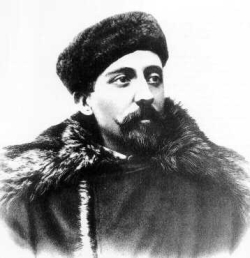
Adrien de Gerlache, leader of the Belgian expedition

The Heroic Age was inaugurated by an expedition launched by the Belgian Geographical Society in 1897; Borchgrevink followed a year later with a privately sponsored British expedition. (Some histories consider the Discovery expedition, which departed in 1901, as the first proper expedition of the Heroic Age.)

The Belgian Antarctic Expedition was led by Belgian Adrian de Gerlache. In 1898, they became the first men to spend winter on Antarctica, when their ship Belgica became trapped in the ice. They became stuck on 28 February 1898, and only managed to get out of the ice on 14 March 1899.

During their forced stay, several men lost their sanity, not only because of the Antarctic winter night and the endured hardship, but also because of the language problems between the different nationalities. This was the first expedition to overwinter within the Antarctic Circle, and they visited the South Shetland Islands.

=== Early British expeditions ===
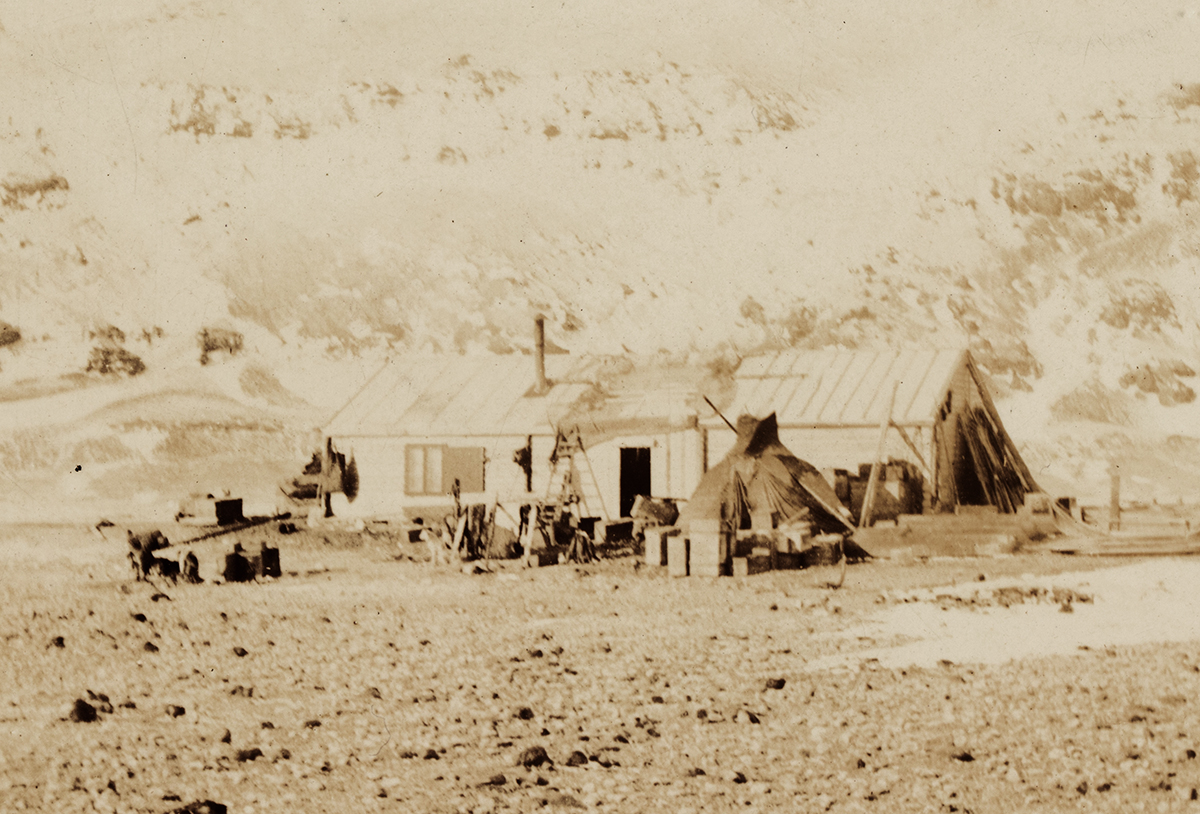
The first base on Antarctica of Carstens Borchgrevink's Southern Cross Expedition (1899). The hut (HSM 22) still stands and is located on Cape Adare, the cape where in 1895 Borchgrevnik participated in the first documented landing on Antarctica.

The Southern Cross Expedition began in 1898 and lasted for two years. SS Southern Cross was used during the expedition. This was the first expedition to overwinter on the Antarctic mainland (Cape Adare) and was the first to make use of dogs and sledges. It made the first ascent of The Great Ice Barrier, (The Great Ice Barrier later became formally known as the Ross Ice Shelf). The expedition set a Farthest South record at 78°30'S. It also calculated the location of the South Magnetic Pole.

The Discovery Expedition was then launched, from 1901 to 1904 and was led by Robert Falcon Scott. It made the first ascent of the Western Mountains in Victoria Land, and discovered the polar plateau. Its southern journey set a new Farthest South record, 82°17'S. Many other geographical features were discovered, mapped and named. This was the first of several expeditions based in McMurdo Sound.

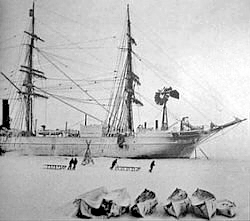
RRS Discovery carried an expedition led by Robert Falcon Scott in 1901.

A year later, the Scottish National Antarctic Expedition was launched, headed by William Speirs Bruce. 'Ormond House' was established as a meteorological observatory on Laurie Island in the South Orkneys and was the first permanent base in Antarctica. The Weddell Sea was penetrated to 74°01'S, and the coastline of Coats Land was discovered, defining the sea's eastern limits.

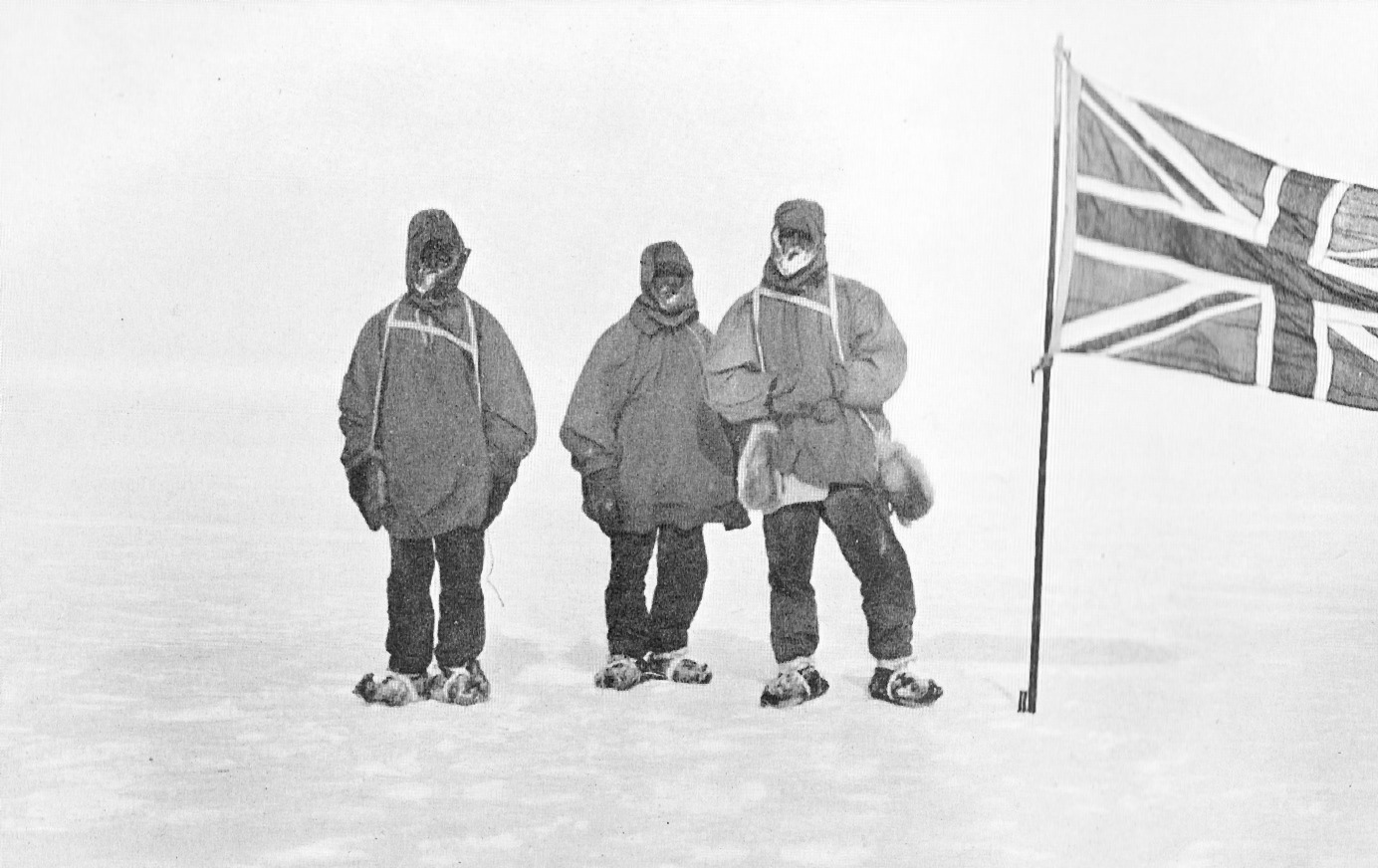
Jameson Adams, Frank Wild and Eric Marshall (left to right) of the Nimrod Expedition plant the Union Flag at their southernmost position.

Ernest Shackleton, who had been a member of Scott's expedition, organized and led the Nimrod Expedition from 1907 to 1909. The expedition's primary objective was of reaching the South Pole. Based in McMurdo Sound, the expedition pioneered the Beardmore Glacier route to the South Pole, and the (limited) use of motorised transport. Its southern march reached 88°23'S, a new Farthest South record 97 geographical miles from the Pole before having to turn back. During the expedition, Shackleton was the first to reach the polar plateau. Parties led by T. W. Edgeworth David also became the first to climb Mount Erebus and to reach the South Magnetic Pole.

=== Expeditions from other countries ===
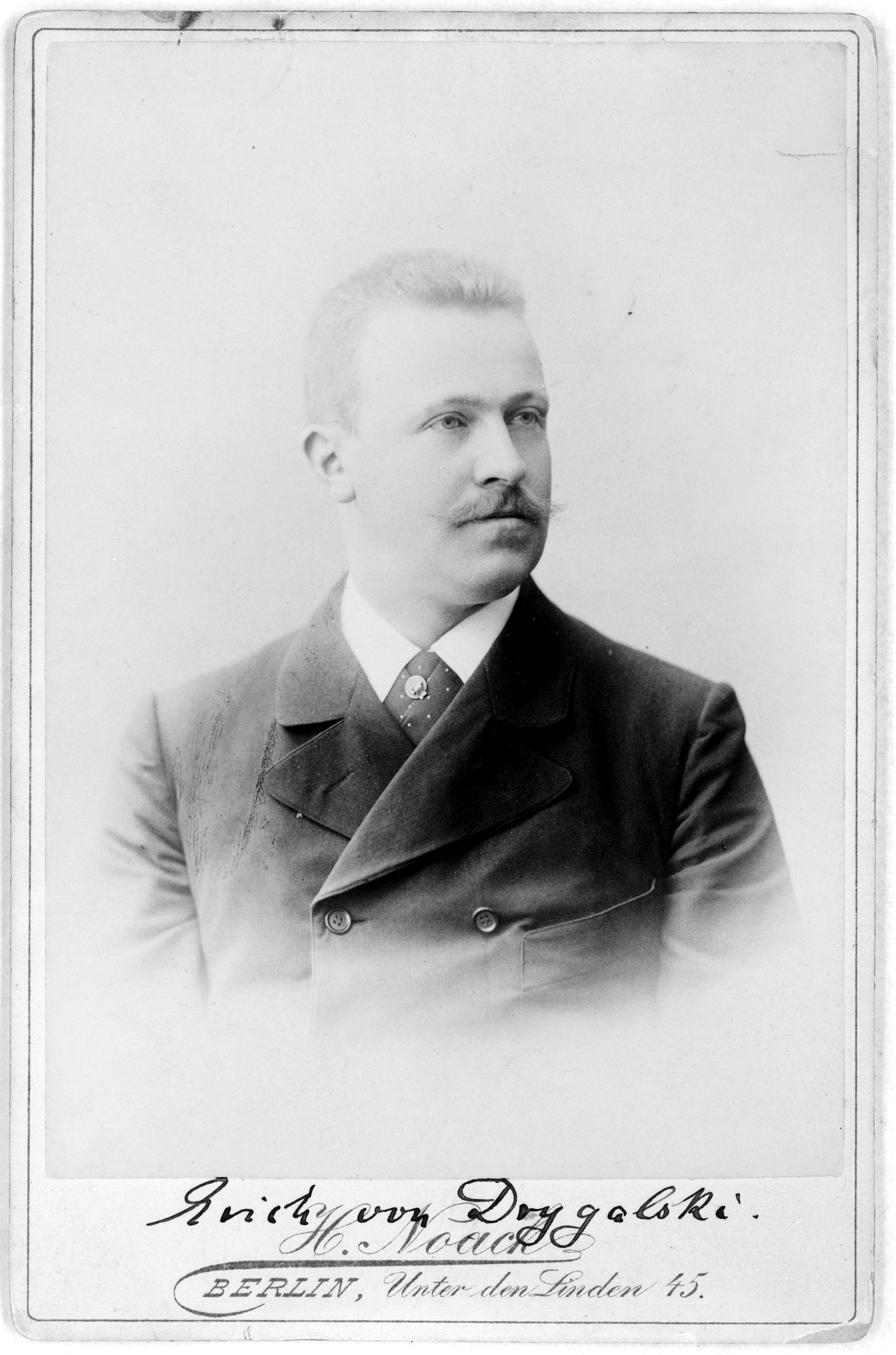
Erich von Drygalski led the First German Antarctic Expedition in 1901.

The First German Antarctic Expedition was sent to investigate eastern Antarctica in 1901. It discovered the coast of Kaiser Wilhelm II Land, and Mount Gauss. The expedition's ship became trapped in ice, however, which prevented more extensive exploration.

The Swedish Antarctic Expedition, operating at the same time worked in the east coastal area of Graham Land, and was marooned on Snow Hill Island and Paulet Island in the Weddell Sea, after the sinking of its expedition ship. It was rescued by the Argentinian naval vessel Uruguay.

The French organized their first expedition in 1903 under the leadership of Jean-Baptiste Charcot. Originally intended as a relief expedition for the stranded Nordenskiöld party, the main work of this expedition was the mapping and charting of islands and the western coasts of Graham Land, on the Antarctic Peninsula. A section of the coast was explored, and named Loubet Land after the President of France.

A follow-up trip was organized from 1908 to 1910 which continued the earlier work of the French expedition with a general exploration of the Bellingshausen Sea, and the discovery of islands and other features, including Marguerite Bay, Charcot Island, Renaud Island, Mikkelsen Bay, Rothschild Island.

=== Race to the South Pole ===
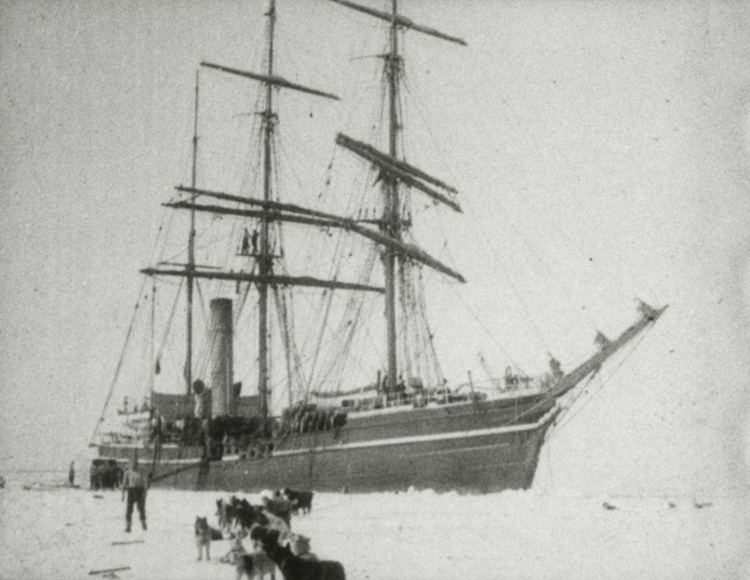
Terra Nova bore Robert Falcon Scott and his team on their ill-fated expedition to the South Pole.

The prize of the Heroic Age was to find and reach the South Pole. Two expeditions set off in 1910 to attain this goal; a party led by Norwegian Polar explorer Roald Amundsen from the ship Fram and Robert Falcon Scott's British group from the Terra Nova.

Amundsen succeeded in reaching the Pole on 14 December 1911 using a route from the Bay of Whales to the polar plateau via the Axel Heiberg Glacier.

Scott and his four companions reached the South Pole via the Beardmore route on 17 January 1912, 33 days after Amundsen. All five died on the return journey from the Pole, through a combination of starvation and cold. The Amundsen–Scott South Pole Station was later named after these two men.

=== Further expeditions ===
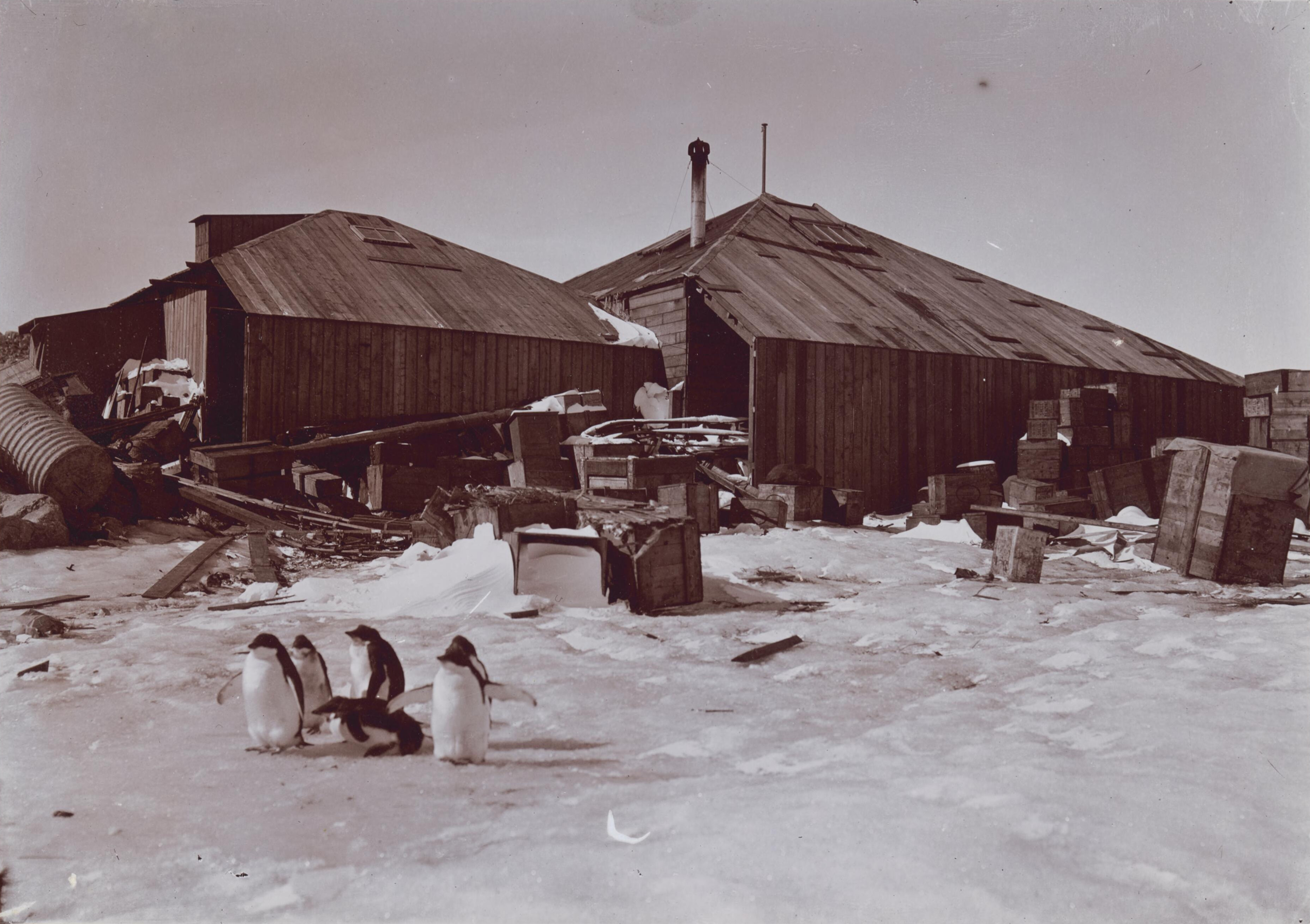
The Main Base Hut of the Australasian Antarctic Expedition

The Australasian Antarctic Expedition took place between 1911–1914 and was led by Sir Douglas Mawson. It concentrated on the stretch of Antarctic coastline between Cape Adare and Mount Gauss, carrying out mapping and survey work on coastal and inland territories.

Discoveries included Commonwealth Bay, Ninnis Glacier, Mertz Glacier, and Queen Mary Land. Major accomplishments were made in geology, glaciology and terrestrial biology.

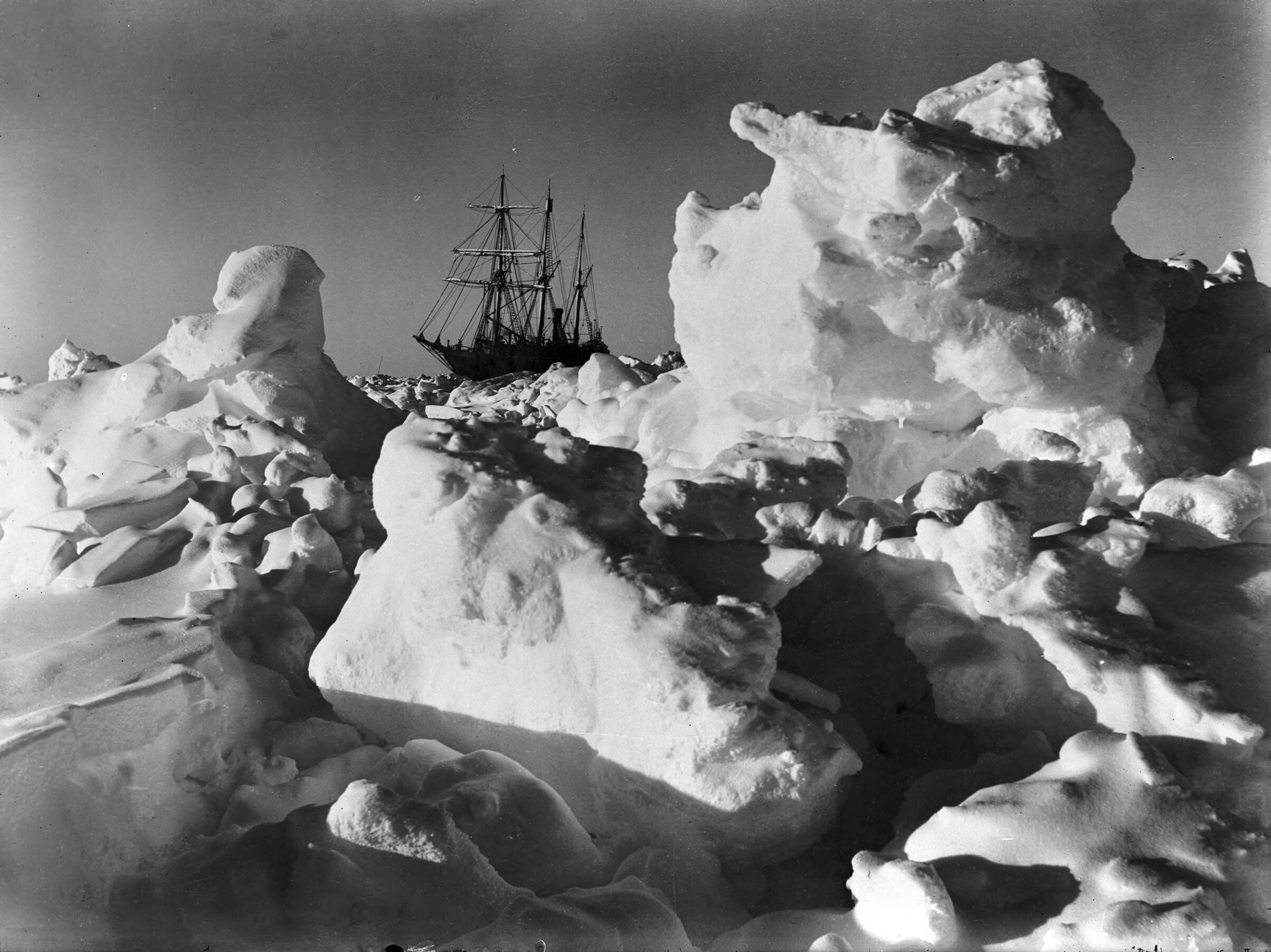
As time wore on it became more and more evident that the ship was doomed by Frank Hurley. (The Endurance trapped in pack ice.)

The Imperial Trans-Antarctic Expedition of 1914–1917 was led by Ernest Shackleton and set out to cross the continent via the South pole. However, their ship, the Endurance, was trapped and crushed by pack ice in the Weddell Sea before they were able to land. The expedition members survived after a journey on sledges over pack ice, a prolonged drift on an ice-floe, and a voyage in three small boats to Elephant Island. Then Shackleton and five others crossed the Southern Ocean in an open boat called James Caird and made the first crossing of South Georgia to raise the alarm at the whaling station Grytviken.

A related component of the Trans-Antarctic Expedition was the Ross Sea party, led by Aeneas Mackintosh. Its objective was to lay depots across the Great Ice Barrier, in order to supply Shackleton's party crossing from the Weddell Sea. All the required depots were laid, but in the process three men, including the leader Mackintosh, died.

Shackleton's last expedition and the one that brought the 'Heroic Age' to a close, was the Shackleton–Rowett Expedition from 1921 to 1922 on board the ship Quest. Its vaguely defined objectives included coastal mapping, a possible continental circumnavigation, the investigation of sub-Antarctic islands, and oceanographic work. After Shackleton's death on 5 January 1922, Quest completed a shortened programme before returning home.

== Further exploration ==
=== By air ===
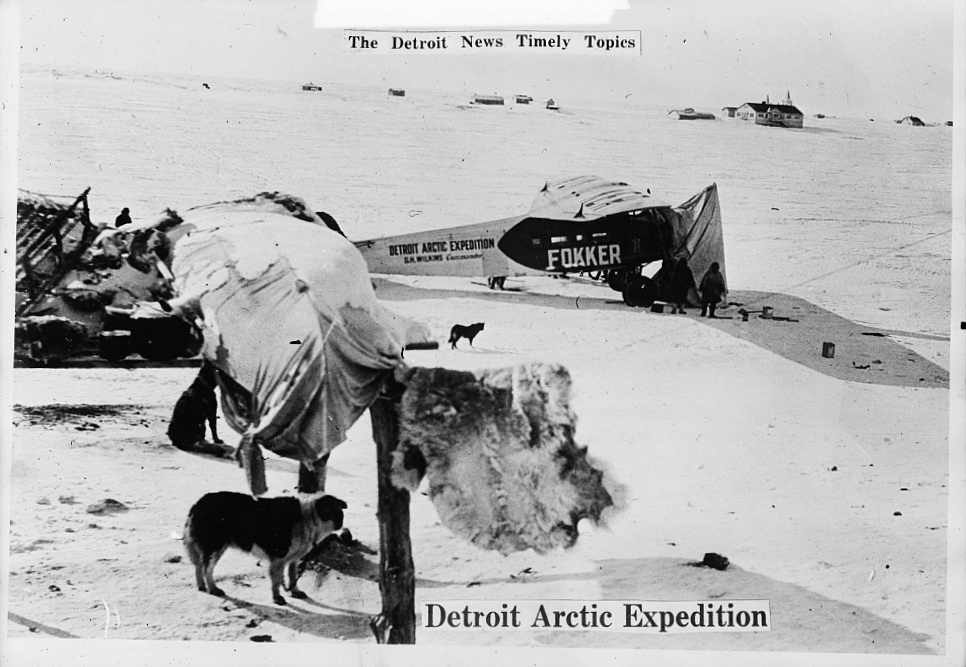
Sir Hubert Wilkins pioneered the exploration of the Arctic regions by aircraft. Pictured, his plane and encampment as part of the Detroit Arctic Expedition, 1926.

After Shackleton's last expedition, there was a hiatus in Antarctic exploration for about seven years. From 1929, aircraft and mechanized transportation were increasingly used, earning this period the sobriquet of the 'Mechanical Age'. Hubert Wilkins first visited Antarctica in 1921–1922 as an ornithologist attached to the Shackleton–Rowett Expedition. From 1927, Wilkins and pilot Carl Ben Eielson began exploring the Arctic by aircraft.

On 15 April 1928, only a year after Charles Lindbergh's flight across the Atlantic, Wilkins and Eielson made a trans-Arctic crossing from Point Barrow, Alaska, to Spitsbergen, arriving about 20 hours later on 16 April, touching along the way at Grant Land on Ellesmere Island. For this feat and his prior work, Wilkins was knighted.

With financial backing from William Randolph Hearst, Wilkins returned to the South Pole and flew over Antarctica in the San Francisco. He named the island of Hearst Land after his sponsor.

US Navy Rear Admiral Richard Evelyn Byrd led five expeditions to Antarctica during the 1930s, 1940s, and 1950s. He overflew the South Pole with pilot Bernt Balchen on 28 and 29 November 1929, to match his overflight of the North Pole in 1926. Byrd's explorations had science as a major objective and extensively used the aircraft to explore the continent.

Captain Finn Ronne, Byrd's executive officer, returned to Antarctica with his own expedition in 1947–1948, with Navy support, three planes, and dogs. Ronne disproved the notion that the continent was divided in two and established that East and West Antarctica was one single continent, i.e. that the Weddell Sea and the Ross Sea are not connected. The expedition explored and mapped large parts of Palmer Land and the Weddell Sea coastline, and identified the Ronne Ice Shelf, named by Ronne after his wife Edith Ronne. Ronne covered 5,800 kilometres (3,600 mi) by ski and dog sled—more than any other explorer in history.

=== Overland crossing ===
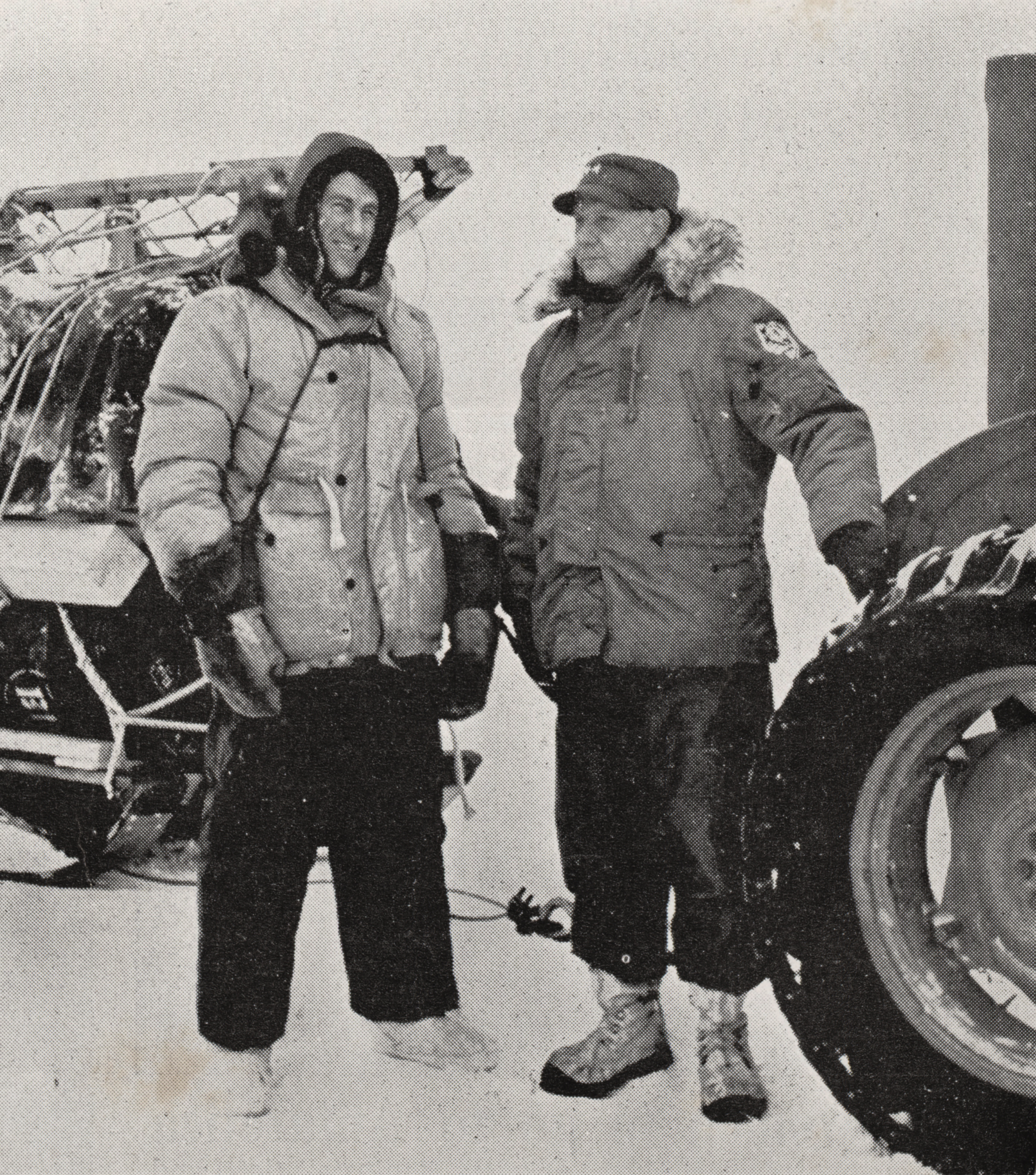
Edmund Hillary (left) with Rear-Admiral George J. Dufek at Scott Base just before the Commonwealth Trans-Antarctic Expedition's departure from the base

The 1955–1958 Commonwealth Trans-Antarctic Expedition successfully completed the first overland crossing of Antarctica, via the South Pole. Although supported by the British and other Commonwealth governments, most of the funding came from corporate and individual donations.

It was headed by British explorer Dr Vivian Fuchs, with New Zealander Sir Edmund Hillary leading the New Zealand Ross Sea Support team. After spending the winter of 1957 at Shackleton Base, Fuchs finally set out on the transcontinental journey in November 1957, with a twelve-man team travelling in six vehicles; three Sno-Cats, two Weasels and one specially adapted Muskeg tractor. En route, the team were also tasked with carrying out scientific research including seismic soundings and gravimetric readings.

In parallel Hillary's team had set up Scott Base – which was to be Fuchs' final destination – on the opposite side of the continent at McMurdo Sound on the Ross Sea. Using three converted Ferguson TE20 tractors and one M29 Weasel (abandoned part-way), Hillary and his three men (Ron Balham, Peter Mulgrew and Murray Ellis), were responsible for route-finding and laying a line of supply depots up the Skelton Glacier and across the Polar Plateau on towards the South Pole, for the use of Fuchs on the final leg of his journey. Other members of Hillary's team carried out geological surveys around the Ross Sea and Victoria Land areas.

Hillary's party reached the South Pole on 3 January 1958, and was just the third (preceded by Amundsen in 1911 and Scott in 1912) to reach the Pole overland. Fuchs' team reached the Pole from the opposite direction on 19 January 1958, where they met up with Hillary. Fuchs then continued overland, following the route that Hillary had laid and on 2 March succeeded in reaching Scott Base, completing the first overland crossing of the continent by land via the South Pole.

== Political history ==
=== Spanish claims ===
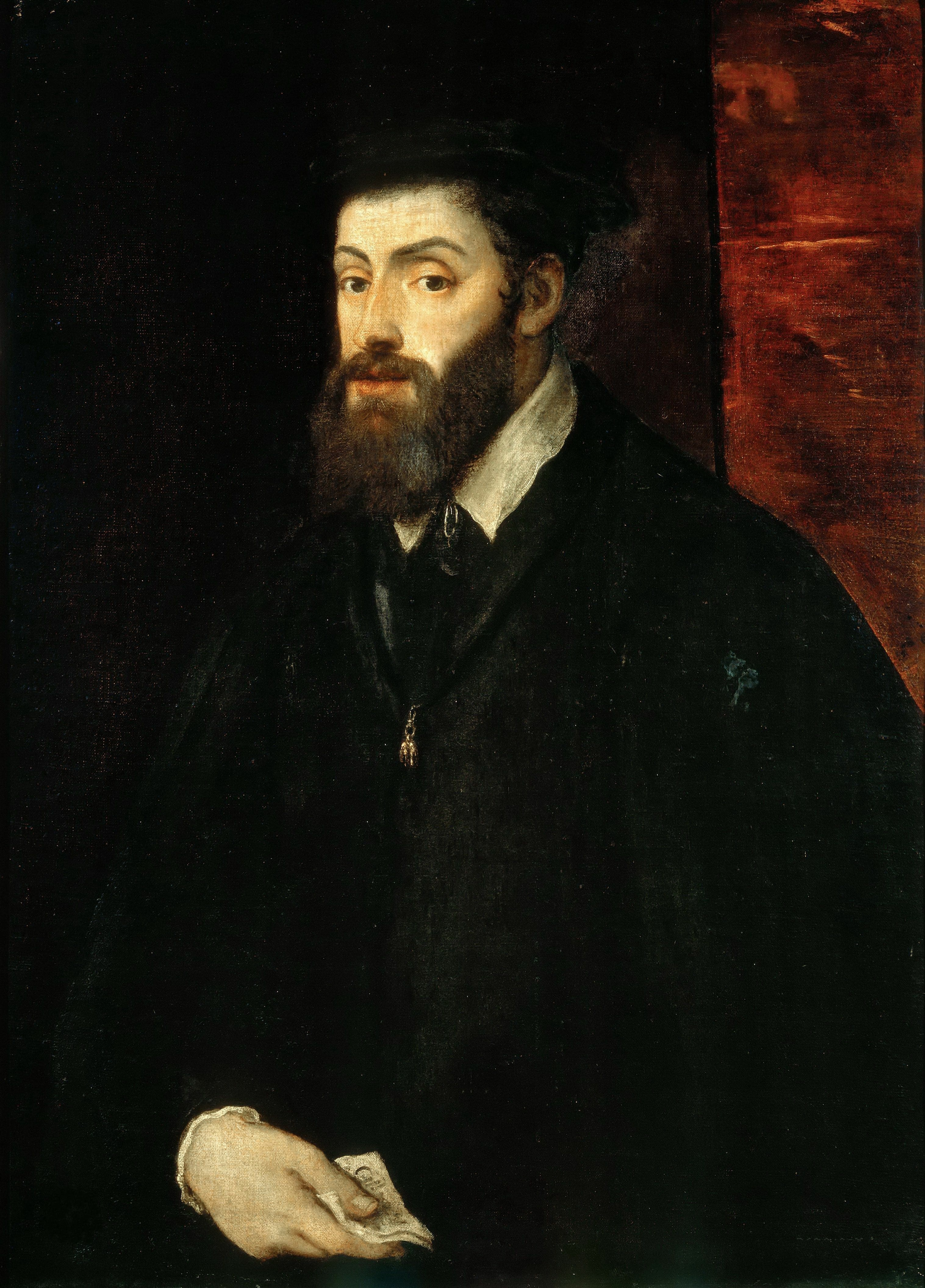
King Charles I of Spain authorized the creation of the Governorate of Terra Australis by means of a royal decree, and ratified its existence by means of other subsequent decrees.

According to Argentina and Chile, the Spanish Empire had claims on Antarctica. The capitulación (governorship) granted to the conquistador Pedro Sánchez de la Hoz in 1539 by the King of Spain, Charles V, explicitly included all lands south of the Straits of Magellan, (Terra Australis, and Tierra del Fuego and by extension potentially the entire continent of Antarctica) and to the East and West the borders were the ones specified in the Treaty of Tordesillas and Zaragoza, respectively, thus creating the Governorate of Terra Australis.

De la Hoz transferred the title to the conqueror Pedro de Valdivia in 1540. In 1555, the claim was incorporated to Chile.

This grant established, according to Argentina and Chile, that an animus occupandi existed on the part of Spain in Antarctica. Spain's sovereignty claim over parts of Antarctica was, according to Chile and Argentina, internationally recognized with the Inter caetera bull of 1493 and the Treaty of Tordesillas of 1494. Argentina and Chile treat these treaties as legal international treaties mediated by the Catholic Church that was at that time a recognized arbiter in such matters. Each country currently has claimed a sector of the Antarctic continent that is more or less directly south of its national antarctic-facing lands.

Modern Spain has not claimed any Antarctic territory. It operates two summer research stations (Gabriel de Castilla Base and Juan Carlos I Base) in the South Shetland Islands.

=== British claims ===
The United Kingdom reasserted sovereignty over the Falkland Islands in the far South Atlantic in 1833 and maintained a continuous presence there. In 1908, the British government extended its territorial claim by declaring sovereignty over "South Georgia, the South Orkneys, the South Shetlands, and the Sandwich Islands, and Graham's Land, situated in the South Atlantic Ocean and on the Antarctic continent to the south of the 50th parallel of south latitude, and lying between the 20th and the 80th degrees of west longitude". All these territories were administered as Falkland Islands Dependencies from Stanley by the Governor of the Falkland Islands. The motivation for this declaration lay in the need for regulating and taxing the whaling industry effectively. Commercial operators would hunt whales in areas outside of the official boundaries of the Falkland Islands and its dependencies and there was a need to close this loophole.

In 1917, the wording of the claim was modified, so as to, among other things, unambiguously include all the territory in the sector stretching to the South Pole (thus encompassing all of the present-day British Antarctic Territory). The new claim covered "all islands and territories whatsoever between the 20th degree of west longitude and the 50th degree of west longitude which are situated south of the 50th parallel of south latitude; and all islands and territories whatsoever between the 50th degree of west longitude and the 80th degree of west longitude which are situated south of the 58th parallel of south latitude".

Under the ambition of Leopold Amery, the Under-Secretary of State for the Colonies, Britain attempted to incorporate the entire continent into the Empire. In a memorandum to the governor-generals for Australia and New Zealand, he wrote that 'with the exception of Chile and Argentina and some barren islands belonging to France... it is desirable that the whole of the Antarctic should ultimately be included in the British Empire.'

The first step was taken on 30 July 1923, when the British government passed an Order in Council under the British Settlements Act 1887, defining the new borders for the Ross Dependency – "that part of His Majesty's Dominions in the Antarctic Seas, which comprises all the islands and territories between the 160th degree of East Longitude and the 150th degree of West Longitude which are situated south of the 60th degree of South Latitude shall be named the Ross Dependency."

The Order in Council then went on to appoint the Governor-General and Commander-in Chief of New Zealand as the Governor of the territory.

In 1930, the United Kingdom claimed Enderby Land. In 1933, a British imperial order transferred territory south of 60° S and between meridians 160° E and 45° E to Australia as the Australian Antarctic Territory.

Following the passing of the Statute of Westminster in 1931, the government of the United Kingdom relinquished all control over the government of New Zealand and Australia. This however had no bearing on the obligations of the Governor-General of both countries in their capacity as Governor of the Antarctic territories.

=== Other European claims ===
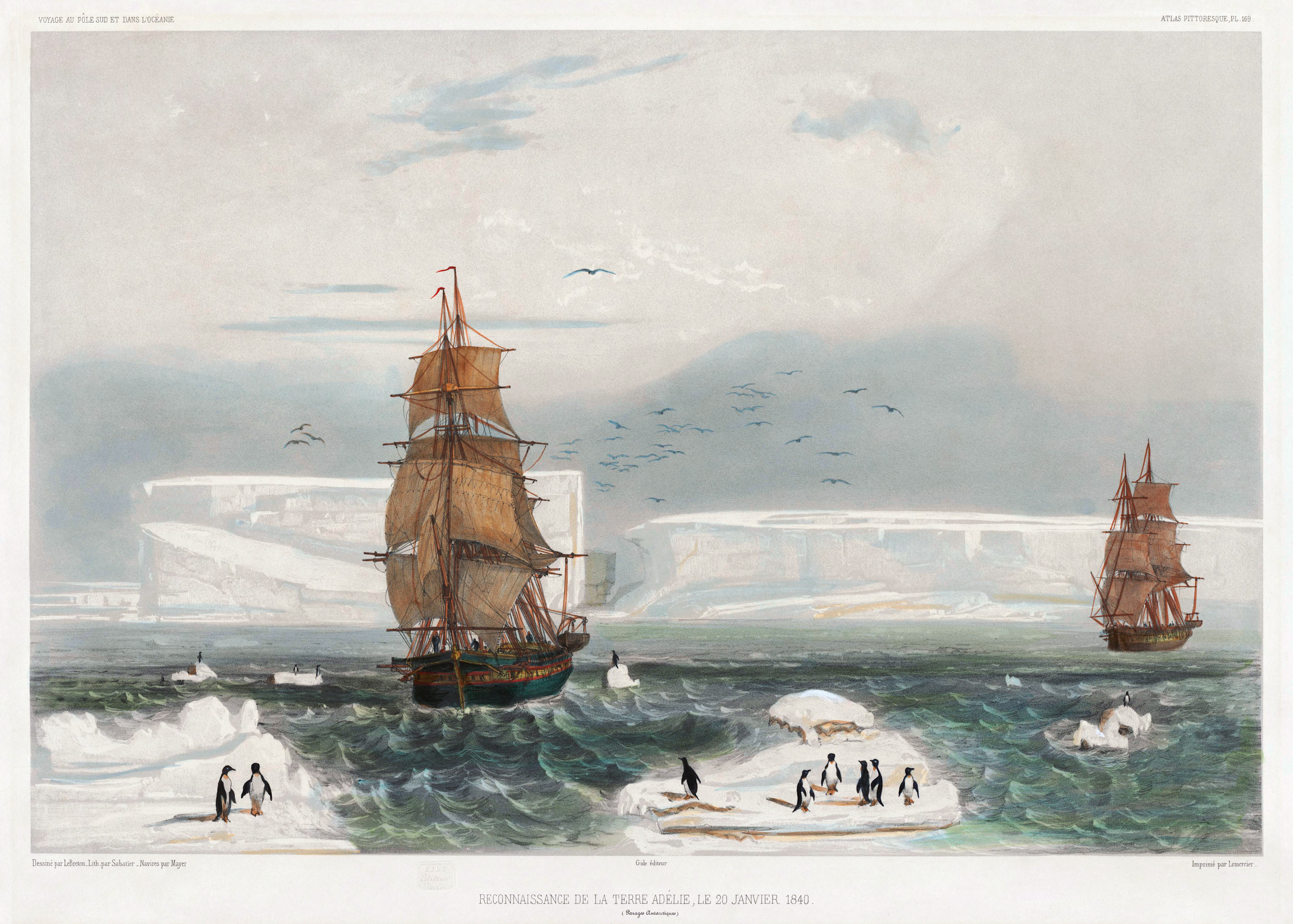
Discovery by Jules Dumont d'Urville of Adélie Land in 1840. This served as a basis for the French claim to this region in 1924.

Meanwhile, alarmed by these unilateral declarations, the French government laid claim to a strip of the continent in 1924. The basis for their claim to Adélie Land lay on the discovery of the coastline in 1840 by the French explorer Jules Dumont d'Urville, who named it after his wife, Adèle. The British eventually decided to recognize this claim and the border between Adélie Land and Australian Antarctic Territory was fixed definitively in 1938.

These developments also concerned Norwegian whaling interests, who wished to avoid the British taxation of whaling stations in the Antarctic and were concerned that they would be commercially excluded from the continent. The whale-ship owner Lars Christensen financed several expeditions to the Antarctic with the view to claim land for Norway and establish stations on Norwegian territory to gain better privileges. The first expedition, led by Nils Larsen and Ola Olstad, landed on Peter I Island in 1929 and claimed the island for Norway. On 6 March 1931, a Norwegian royal proclamation declared the island under Norwegian sovereignty and on 23 March 1933 the island was declared a dependency.

The 1929 expedition led by Hjalmar Riiser-Larsen and Finn Lützow-Holm named the continental land mass near the island as Queen Maud Land, named after the Norwegian queen Maud of Wales. The territory was explored further during the Norvegia expedition of 1930–31. Negotiations with the British government in 1938 resulted in the western border of Queen Maud Land being set at 20°W.

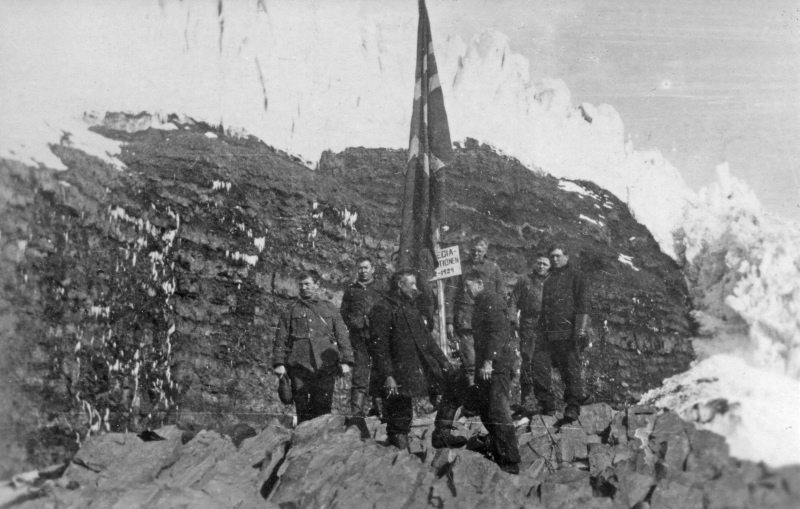
Norwegian expedition landing on Peter I Island in 1929

Norway's claim was disputed by Nazi Germany, which in 1938 dispatched the German Antarctic Expedition, led by Alfred Ritscher, to fly over as much of it as possible. The ship Schwabenland reached the pack ice off Antarctica on 19 January 1939. During the expedition, an area of about 350,000 square kilometres (140,000 sq mi) was photographed from the air by Ritscher, who dropped darts inscribed with swastikas every 26 kilometres (16 mi). Germany eventually attempted to claim the territory surveyed by Ritscher under the name New Swabia, but lost any claim to the land following its defeat in the Second World War.

On 14 January 1939, five days prior to the German arrival, Queen Maud Land was annexed by Norway, after a royal decree announced that the land bordering the Falkland Islands Dependencies in the west and the Australian Antarctic Dependency in the east was to be brought under Norwegian sovereignty. The primary basis for the annexation was to secure the Norwegian whaling industry's access to the region. In 1948, Norway and the United Kingdom agreed to limit Queen Maud Land to from 20°W to 45°E, and that the Bruce Coast and Coats Land were to be incorporated into Norwegian territory.

=== South American involvement ===
This encroachment of foreign powers was a matter of immense disquiet to the nearby South American countries, Argentina and Chile.

In 1831, Chile's liberator Bernardo O'Higgins wrote to the Royal Navy, saying:

Old and new Chile extends, on the Pacific from the Mejillones Bay to New South Shetland, in latitude 65° South and on the Atlantic from San Jose Peninsula at latitude 42° to New South Shetland, that means, 23° with a glut of excellent ports on both oceans and all of them wholesome in all seasons. A simple glance at the map of South America is sufficient to prove that Chile, as is described, holds the keys of that vast portion of the South Atlantic

President Jorge Montt enacted Fishing Ordinance No. 1,623 on August 17, 1892, which sought to control illegal fishing of seals, sea lions, otters, and other species, being the first document that sought to regulate the extraction of natural resources on Antarctica. As a form of indirect control, leases and concessions were granted for the islands located south of Cape Horn. Some of the businessmen who applied for them were: Pedro Pablo Benavides, Lujes Koenigswerther, José Pasinovich, Domingo Toro Herrera, and Enrique Fabry. The Decree No. 1,642, prohibited hunting and fishing for one year. Subsequently, on August 19, 1893, and before the ban ended, the government, with the approval of the Council of State, extended by Decree No. 83, for four years, the hunting and fishing of seals, sea lions, otters, and chungungos in the area. In 1894, control over the exploitation of marine resources south of latitude 54 degrees south was given to the Punta Arenas Municipality.

In 1895 and 1896, the Chilean Navy started studies in the Antarctic continent since they received communications from captains of whaling and merchant ships from the Antarctic seas. Otto Nordenskjöld shared with the Chilean Scientific Society and its president, Federico Puga Borne, the idea of traveling to the South Shetland Islands in the summer of 1896–1897; however, these plans did not come to fruition.

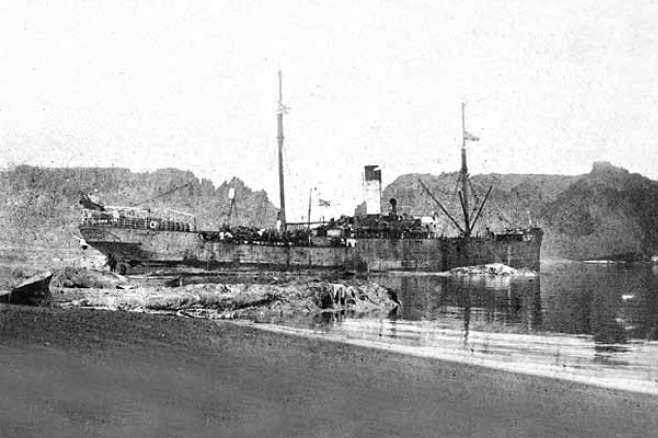
Gobernador Bories, a Chilean factory ship, anchored in Balleneros Cove, Deception Island in 1908.

Starting from 1903, Chilean whalers visited Deception Island, led by the Norwegian captain Adolf Amandus Andresen under the Chilean flag.

By supreme decree, the Government of Chile approved in 1906 the statutes of the Magellan Whaling Company, organized by Captain Andresen and Pedro A. de Bruyne, which since the previous year had been carrying out its operations in Whalers Bay of Deception with the factory ship Gobernador Bories. Other whaling companies followed, such as the Corral Whaling Society and the Magallanes Fishing Company, with had several hundred men residing in Deception during the Antarctic summers and operated until World War I. In that same year, the Minister of Foreign Affairs of Chile mentioned on September 18 that the delimitation of Chilean Antarctic territory would be the subject of a preliminary investigation. Also, President Germán Riesco created an Antarctic Commission dependent from that ministry, with the aim of organizing the first Chilean Antarctic Expedition and building a weather station to strengthen sovereignty in these territories through an effective presence, however the 1906 Valparaíso earthquake made it impossible for the project to receive funding. On 10 June 1907, Argentina formally protested and asked for mutual recognition of Antarctic territories. There was work on a treaty to more concretely define territories in the region, but it was never signed.

In 1908, the British ship Telefon, which was carrying coal for the supply of whalers on King George Island in the South Shetland Islands, ran aground on the reefs of Admiralty Bay (now known as Telefon Rocks) and was abandoned by its crew due to severe damage. Upon learning of the incident on Deception Island, several ships set sail for the site. Captain Andresen, aboard the Chilean whaler Almirante Valenzuela, arrived first, boarded the abandoned ship in a dangerous maneuver, raised the Chilean flag and claimed it according to maritime law. He towed it to Deception Island, beaching it in a cove (now Telefon Cove) for repairs. The following spring, the factory ship Gobernador Bories repaired it successfully, allowing the Telefon to sail again under the Chilean flag. The whaling society acquired the steamship Telefon that belonged to the Lloyds company in 1910, which had been put up for auction after the accident.

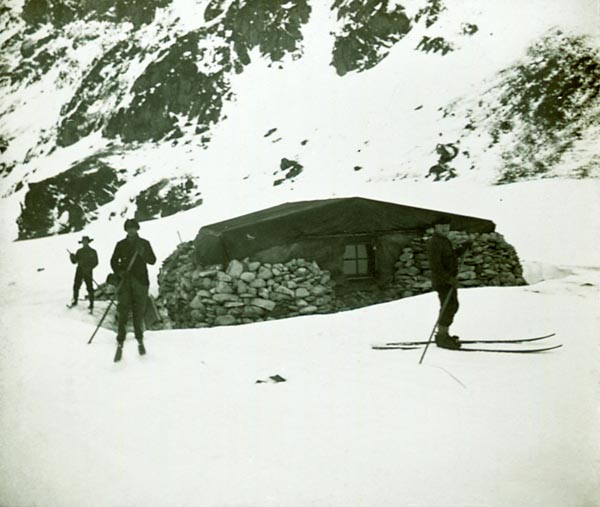
Omond House was built in 1904 by the Scottish National Antarctic Expedition as the first permanent base on Insular Antarctica. It was later sold to Argentina.

In 1904 the Argentine government began a permanent occupation in the area with the purchase of a meteorological station on Laurie Island established in 1903 by Dr William S. Bruce's Scottish National Antarctic Expedition. Bruce offered to transfer the station and instruments for the sum of 5.000 pesos, on the condition that the government committed itself to the continuation of the scientific mission. British officer William Haggard also sent a note to the Argentine Foreign Minister, Jose Terry, ratifying the terms of Bruce proposition.

In 1906, Argentina communicated to the international community the establishment of a permanent base on South Orkney Islands. However, Haggard responded by reminding Argentina that the South Orkneys were British. The British position was that Argentine personnel was granted permission only for the period of one year. The Argentine government entered into negotiations with the British in 1913 over the possible transfer of the island. Although these talks were unsuccessful, Argentina attempted to unilaterally establish their sovereignty with the erection of markers, national flags and other symbols.

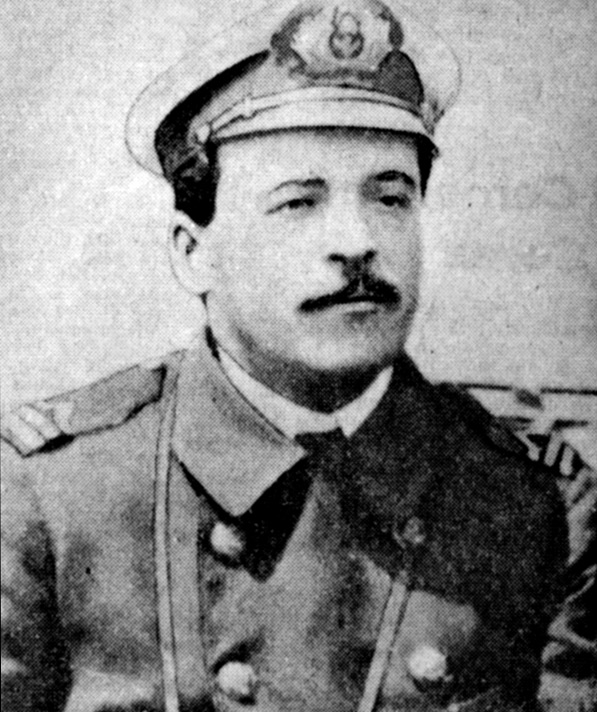
Luis Pardo Villalón, the Chilean sailor who recued Ernest Shackleton's expedition who had been stranded on Elephant Island for eight months on August 30, 1916.

In 1914, Anglo-Irish explorer Ernest Shackleton began an expedition to cross the South Pole from the Weddell Sea to the Ross Sea, known as the Imperial Trans-Antarctic Expedition. With the ship Endurance he sailed into the Weddell Sea, but the weather worsened dramatically and the Endurance was trapped for weeks and ultimately crushed by the ice. There followed an episode of bravery involving both Britain and Chile. Shackleton and his crew dragged three lifeboats over the frozen sea until they came to open water again, then sailed to the desolate Elephant Island at the very northern tip of the Antarctic peninsula. Shackleton and a picked crew then sailed one boat to South Georgia Island where help was obtained. However, three attempts to reach the rest of the expedition on Elephant Island were turned back by pack ice. Finally, in Punta Arenas, Shackleton obtained the help of the Chilean navy tugboat Yelcho, captained by Luis Pardo Villalón, which managed to rescue the remaining survivors. On 4 September 1916, they were received at the port of Punta Arenas as heroes. Captain Pardo's feat, sailing with temperatures close to −30 °C (−22 °F) and a stormy sea of icebergs, won him national and international recognition. On January 14, 1939, Norway declared its territorial claims on Antarctic territory between 0° and 20° (Queen Maud Land). This alarmed the Chilean government, which led President Pedro Aguirre Cerda to encourage the definition of the National Antarctic Territory. With the establishment of Decree No. 1541 on September 7, he organized a commission to examine Norway's interests in the Antarctic and the Chilean rights in the territory led by Julio Escudero Guzmán. The Commander Ramón Cañas Montalva demanded on April 1, 1940, that the Chilean borders in the Antarctic should be explicitly stated as soon as possible.

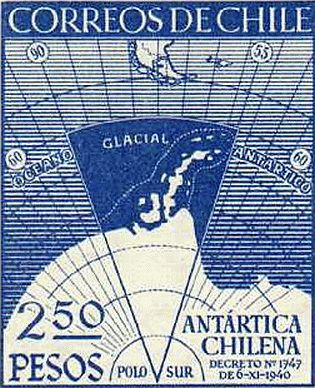
Commemorative stamp of the Chilean Antarctic declaration of 1940

Taking advantage of a European continent plunged into turmoil with the onset of the Second World War, Chile's president, Pedro Aguirre Cerda declared the establishment of a Chilean Antarctic Territory based on the uti possidetis juris principle inheriting the Spanish claims on Terra Australis that were transferred to the Governorate of Chile in 1555. The Chilean commission, with the ad honorem work of Julio Escudero, set the bounds according to the theory of polar areas, taking into account geographical, historical, legal, and diplomatic precedents, which were formalized by Decree No. 1747, enacted on November 6, 1940, and published on June 21, 1955. According to Pablo Ihl, the inherited Antarctic rights of Chile had as its eastern border the Tordesillas meridian located further east than the claimed 53° W. Thus, some authors claim that the country avoided to include the South Orkney Islands (Note: Some Chilean nationalist sources like Oscar Espinosa Moraga, claim that Chile renounced to a third of its Antarctic sector in favor of Argentina, without stating sources, stating that the Tordesillas line passed through the meridian 37° 7' W, however, classically it is considered that Spain understood approximately at 46° 37 'W.) by considering the rights of Argentina over them, however most of the calculations of the Tordesillas meridian are west of the mentioned islands. Argentina formally protested the Chilean decree in on a note from November 12, 1940, rejecting Chile's claim and expressing a potential claim to a similar area. In the 20th century, these areas were claimed by Britain.

In response to this and earlier German explorations, the British Admiralty and Colonial Office launched Operation Tabarin in 1943 to reassert British territorial claims against Argentine and Chilean incursion and establish a permanent British presence in the Antarctic. The move was also motivated by concerns within the Foreign Office about the direction of United States post-war activity in the region.

A suitable cover story was the need to deny use of the area to the enemy. The Kriegsmarine was known to use remote islands as rendezvous points and as shelters for commerce raiders, U-boats and supply ships. Also, in 1941, there existed a fear that Japan might attempt to seize the Falkland Islands, either as a base or to hand them over to Argentina, thus gaining political advantage for the Axis and denying their use to Britain.

In June 1939, Argentina created a provisional Antarctic commission to participate in the International Polar Conference to be held in Norway in 1940. On April 30, 1940 a permanent National Antarctic Commission was established that led to the definition of a claim on the Antarctic mainland. Argentina published a map in October 1941 showing "the Antarctic Sector in which the Argentine Republic maintains rights" between 75° W and 25° W, south of 60° S, without a formal legal claim yet. In January 1942, Argentina declared its Antarctic rights between the meridians at 25° and 68° 34' W, south of 60° S, establishing the Argentine Antarctica. (Note: Oscar Espinosa Moraga claims it was on the 68° 24' W meridian instead of 68° 34' W, being a direct projection from Punta Dúngeness, the southernmost point of mainland Argentina.) On September 2, 1946, Decree No. 8944 required all the national maps to show the claimed territory of the Argentine Antarctic Sector, which was extended between the meridians at 25° and 74° west longitude, south of 60° S. On February 28, 1957, Decree Law No. 2129 repeated the claim between the meridians at 25° and 74° West and the parallel 60° South latitude. The claimed territory is overlapped in part by the British (20°W to 80°W) and the earlier Chilean (53°W to 90°W) claims.

In 1943, British personnel from HMS Carnarvon Castle removed Argentine flags from Deception Island. The expedition was led by Lieutenant James Marr and left the Falkland Islands in two ships, HMS William Scoresby (a minesweeping trawler) and Fitzroy, on Saturday 29 January 1944.

Bases were established during February near the abandoned Norwegian whaling station on Deception Island, where the Union Flag was hoisted in place of Argentine flags, and at Port Lockroy (on February 11) on the coast of Graham Land. A further base was founded at Hope Bay on 13 February 1945, after a failed attempt to unload stores on 7 February 1944. Symbols of British sovereignty, including post offices, signposts and plaques were also constructed and postage stamps were issued.

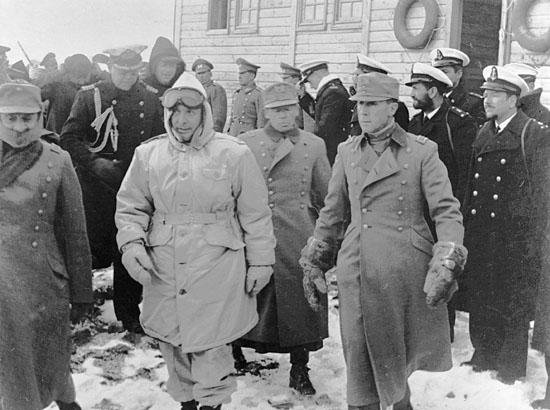
Gabriel González Videla inaugurating the Base General Bernardo O'Higgins Riquelme in Antarctica in 1948.

Operation Tabarin provoked Chile to organize its First Chilean Antarctic Expedition in 1947–48, where the Chilean president Gabriel González Videla personally inaugurated the Base General Bernardo O'Higgins Riquelme.

Following the end of the war in 1945, the British bases were handed over to civilian members of the newly created Falkland Islands Dependencies Survey (subsequently the British Antarctic Survey) the first such national scientific body to be established in Antarctica.

Overlapping Argentine and Chilean Antarctic claims on Antarctica (1946–present).

Geopolitics over Antarctica and the control of the passages between the south Atlantic and the south Pacific have led to the founding of cities and towns such as Ushuaia and Puerto Williams, both of which claim to be the southernmost cities in World.

In the late 1940s, Argentina and Chile recognized each other's claims, stating that "Chile and Argentina have unquestionable rights of sovereignty in the polar area called American Antarctica ("Antártida Americana" in Spanish)".

On March 4, 1948, Chile and Argentina signed an agreement about Antarctica. It said:

(...) until agreed, by mutual agreement, the line common neighborhood in Antarctic territories of Chile and Argentina, declared:
1) That both governments acting in agreement on legal protection and defense of their rights in American Antarctica, between the meridians 25° and 90° west longitude of Greenwich, indisputable sovereign rights are recognized by Chile and Argentina.

Currently, both countries have research stations in Antarctica, as does the United Kingdom. All three nations claim the totality of the Antarctic Peninsula.

=== Post-war developments ===
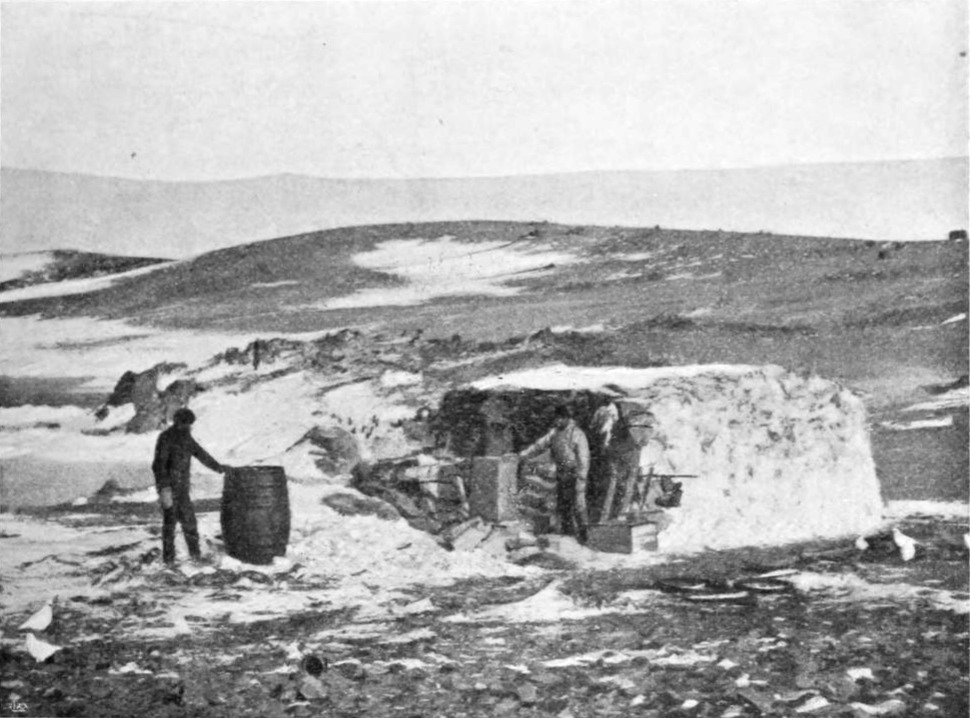
Hut built at Hope Bay in 1903. It was there that the only instance of shots fired in anger on the Continent occurred in 1952.

Friction between Britain and the Latin American states continued into the post war period. Royal Navy warships were despatched in 1948 to prevent naval incursions and in 1952, an Argentine shore party at Hope Bay (the British Base "D", established there in 1945, came up against the Argentine Esperanza Base, est. 1952) fired a machine gun over the heads of a British Antarctic Survey team unloading supplies from the John Biscoe. The Argentines later extended a diplomatic apology, saying that there had been a misunderstanding and that the Argentine military commander on the ground had exceeded his authority.

The United States became politically interested in the Antarctic continent before and during WWII. The United States Antarctic Service Expedition, from 1939 to 1941, was sponsored by the government with additional support came from donations and gifts by private citizens, corporations and institutions. The objectives of the Expedition, outlined by President Franklin D. Roosevelt, was to establish two bases: East Base, in the vicinity of Charcot Island, and West Base, in the vicinity of King Edward VII Land. After operating successfully for two years, but with international tensions on the rise, it was considered wise to evacuate the two bases.

However, immediately after the war, American interest was rekindled with an explicitly geopolitical motive. Operation Highjump, from 1946 to 1947 was organized by Rear Admiral Richard E. Byrd Jr. and included 4,700 men, 13 ships, and multiple aircraft. The primary mission of Operation Highjump was to establish the Antarctic research base Little America IV, for the purpose of training personnel and testing equipment in frigid conditions and amplifying existing stores of knowledge of hydrographic, geographic, geological, meteorological and electromagnetic propagation conditions in the area. The mission was also aimed at consolidating and extending United States sovereignty over the largest practicable area of the Antarctic continent, although this was publicly denied as a goal even before the expedition ended.

=== Towards an international treaty ===
Official emblem of the International Geophysical Year

Meanwhile, in an attempt at ending the impasse, on May 4, 1955, Britain submitted two applications to the International Court of Justice to adjudicate between the territorial claims of Britain, Argentina and Chile, declaring invalid the claims of sovereignty of the two countries in the Antarctic and sub-Antarctic areas, respectively. This proposal failed, as both Latin American countries rejected submitting to an international arbitration procedure. On July 15, 1955, the Chilean government rejected the jurisdiction of the Court in that case, and on August 1, August, Argentine government followed suit. Thus, on March 16 March 1956, claims were filed.

Law No. 11486 of June 17, 1955, added the Chilean Antarctic Territory to the Province of Magallanes, which on July 12, 1974 became the Region of Magallanes and Chilean Antarctica.

In 1958, the U.S. president, Dwight Eisenhower, invited Chile to the International Geophysical Year Conference in an attempt to resolve the claiming issues.

Negotiations towards the establishment of an international condominium over the continent first began in 1948, involving the 7 claimant powers (Britain, Australia, New Zealand, France, Norway, Chile and Argentina) and the US. This attempt was aimed at excluding the Soviet Union from the affairs of the continent and rapidly fell apart when the USSR declared an interest in the region, refused to recognize any claims of sovereignty and reserved the right to make its own claims in 1950.

An important impetus toward the formation of the Antarctic Treaty System in 1959, was the International Geophysical Year, 1957–1958. This year of international scientific cooperation triggered an 18-month period of intense Antarctic science. More than 70 existing national scientific organizations then formed IGY committees, and participated in the cooperative effort. The British established Halley Research Station in 1956 by an expedition from the Royal Society. Sir Vivian Fuchs headed the Commonwealth Trans-Antarctic Expedition, which completed the first overland crossing of Antarctica in 1958. In Japan, the Japan Maritime Safety Agency offered ice breaker Sōya as the South Pole observation ship and Showa Station was built as the first Japanese observation base on Antarctica.

France contributed with Dumont d'Urville Station and Charcot Station in Adélie Land. The ship Commandant Charcot of the French Navy spent nine months of 1949/50 at the coast of Adelie Land, performing ionospheric soundings. The US erected the Amundsen–Scott South Pole Station as the first permanent structure directly over the South Pole in January 1957.

Finally, to prevent the possibility of military conflict in the region, the United States, United Kingdom, the Soviet Union and 9 other countries with significant interests negotiated and signed the Antarctic Treaty in 1959. The treaty entered into force in 1961 and sets aside Antarctica as a scientific preserve, established freedom of scientific investigation and banned military activity on that continent. The treaty was the first arms control agreement established during the Cold War.

== Recent history ==
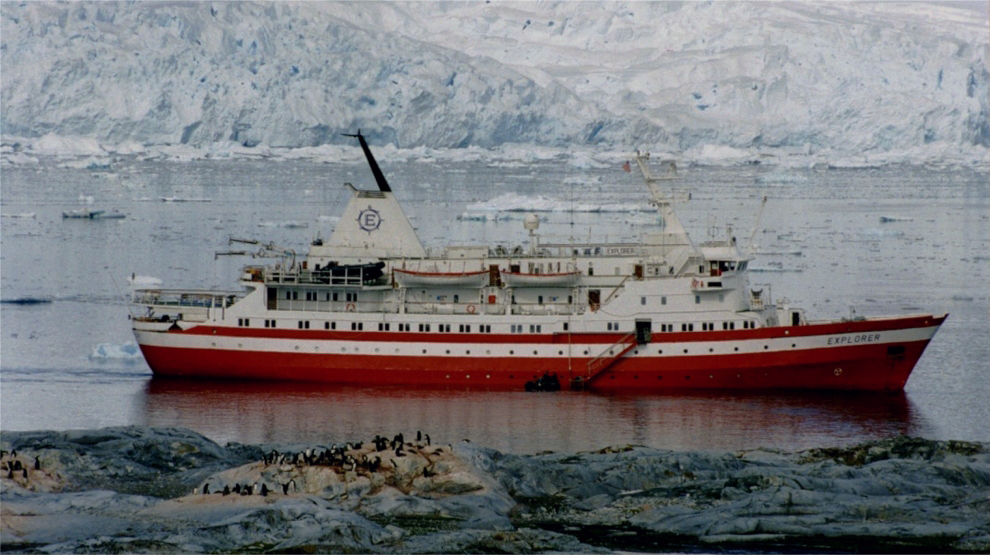
The MV Explorer in Antarctica in January 1999. She sank on 23 November 2007 after hitting an iceberg.

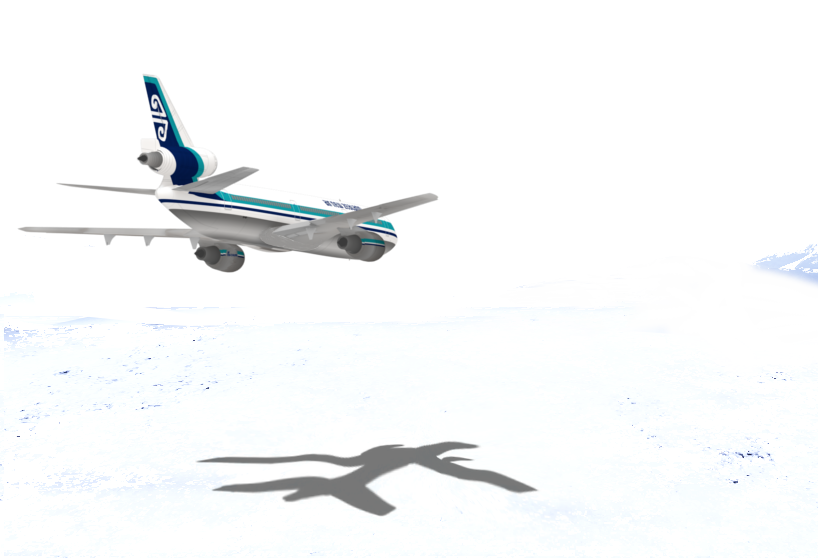
Air New Zealand Flight 901 crashes on Mt. Erebus

In May 1965, the American physicist Carl R. Disch went missing during the course of his routine research near Byrd Station, Antarctica. His body was never found.

A baby, named Emilio Marcos de Palma, was born near Hope Bay on 7 January 1978, becoming the first baby born on the continent. He also was born farther south than anyone in history.

On 28 November 1979, an Air New Zealand DC-10 on a sightseeing trip crashed into Mount Erebus on Ross Island, killing all 257 people on board.

In 1991 a convention among member nations of the Antarctic Treaty on how to regulate mining and drilling was proposed. Australian Prime Minister Bob Hawke and French Prime Minister Michel Rocard led a response to this convention that resulted in the adoption of the Protocol on Environmental Protection to the Antarctic Treaty, now known as the Madrid Protocol. All mineral extraction was banned for 50 years and the Antarctic was set aside as a "natural reserve, devoted to peace and science".

Børge Ousland, a Norwegian explorer, finished the first unassisted Antarctic solo crossing on 18 January 1997.

On 23 November 2007, the MV Explorer struck an iceberg and sank, but all on board were rescued by nearby ships, including a passing Norwegian cruise ship, the MS Nordnorge.

In 2010, the IceCube Neutrino Observatory was completed. In 2013, it was reported that the observatory had detected 28 neutrinos that originated outside the Solar System.

In 2021, a research paper in the Journal of the Royal Society of New Zealand claimed early Polynesians voyaging from Raratonga were the first people to see Antarctica. This idea was dismissed as highly improbable in a reply in the same journal that criticised the methodology used and the lack of any plausible evidence. It was pointed out that the paper was the latest version of a story by Percy Smith first published in 1899 that was based on his questionable interpretation of Polynesian oral tradition that had no basis in fact.

== Women in Antarctica ==
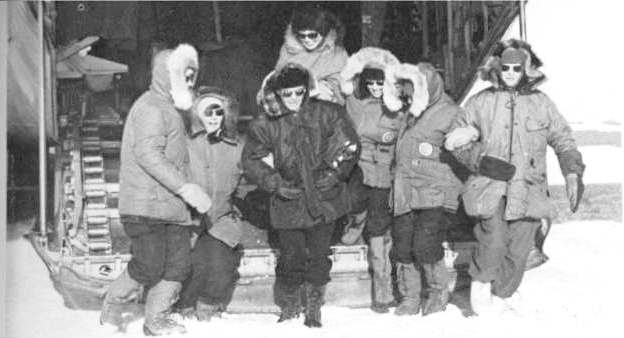
The first women at the South Pole are Pam Young, Jean Pearson, Lois Jones, Eileen McSaveney, Kay Lindsay and Terry Tickhill.

Women did not explore Antarctica until well into the 1950s. A few pioneering women visited the Antarctic land and waters prior to the 1950s and many women requested to go on early expeditions, but were turned away. Early pioneers such as Louise Séguin and Ingrid Christensen were some of the first women to see Antarctic waters. Christensen was the first woman to set foot on the mainland of Antarctica. The first women to have any fanfare about their Antarctic journeys were Caroline Mikkelsen who set foot on an island of Antarctica in 1935, and Jackie Ronne and Jennie Darlington who were the first women to over-winter in Antarctica in 1947. The first woman scientist to work in Antarctica was Maria Klenova in 1956. Silvia Morella de Palma was the first woman to give birth in Antarctica, delivering 3.4 kg (7 lb 8 oz) Emilio Palma at the Argentine Esperanza base 7 January 1978.

Women faced legal barriers and sexism that prevented most from visiting Antarctica and doing research until the late 1960s. The United States Congress banned American women from traveling to Antarctica until 1969. Women were often excluded because it was thought that they could not handle the extreme temperatures or crisis situations. The first woman from the British Antarctic Survey to go to Antarctica was Janet Thomson in 1983 who described the ban on women as a "rather improper segregation."

Once women were allowed in Antarctica, they still had to fight against sexism and sexual harassment. However, a tipping point was reached in the mid-1990s when it became the new normal that women were part of Antarctic life. Women began to see a change as more and more women began working and researching in Antarctica.

== See also ==
- Colonization of Antarctica
- Heroic Age of Antarctic Exploration
- History of Livingston Island
- History of South Georgia and the South Sandwich Islands
- List of Antarctic expeditions
- List of Russian explorers
- Research stations in Antarctica
- Timeline of women in Antarctica
- Ui-te-Rangiora, a Polynesian navigator who may have reached or sighted Antarctica
- Women in Antarctica

== Sources ==
- Alberts, Fred G., ed. (1995), "Geographic Names of the Antarctic" (PDF), USGS Report (2 ed.), United States Board on Geographic Names: 3, Bibcode:1995usgs.rept....3U This article incorporates public domain material from websites or documents of the United States Board on Geographic Names.
- Stackpole, Edouard (1955), The voyage of the Huron and the Huntress, Mystic, CT: Marine Historical Association, INC.
- Tammiksaar, E. (2016). "The Russian Antarctic Expedition under the command of Fabian Gottlieb von Bellingshausen and its reception in Russia and the world". Vol. 52, no. 5. Polar Record. pp. 578–600.
- Балкли Рип (Англия) (2013). "Первые наблюдения материковой части Антарктиды: попытка критического анализа". No. 4. Вопросы истории естествознания и техники. pp. 41–56. Archived from the original on 2022-09-12.
- Беллинсгаузен Ф. Ф. (2008). Двукратные изыскания в Южном Ледовитом океане и плавание вокруг света (in Russian). Moscow: Дрофа. ISBN 978-5-358-02961-3.
