= 2026 in Antarctica =

- Decades: 2000s; 2010s; 2020s
- See also: Other events of 2026; Timeline of Antarctic history

This is a list of events occurring in Antarctica in 2026.

== Ongoing events ==
- Climate change in Antarctica
- Environmental impact of the growing Tourism in Antarctica

== January ==
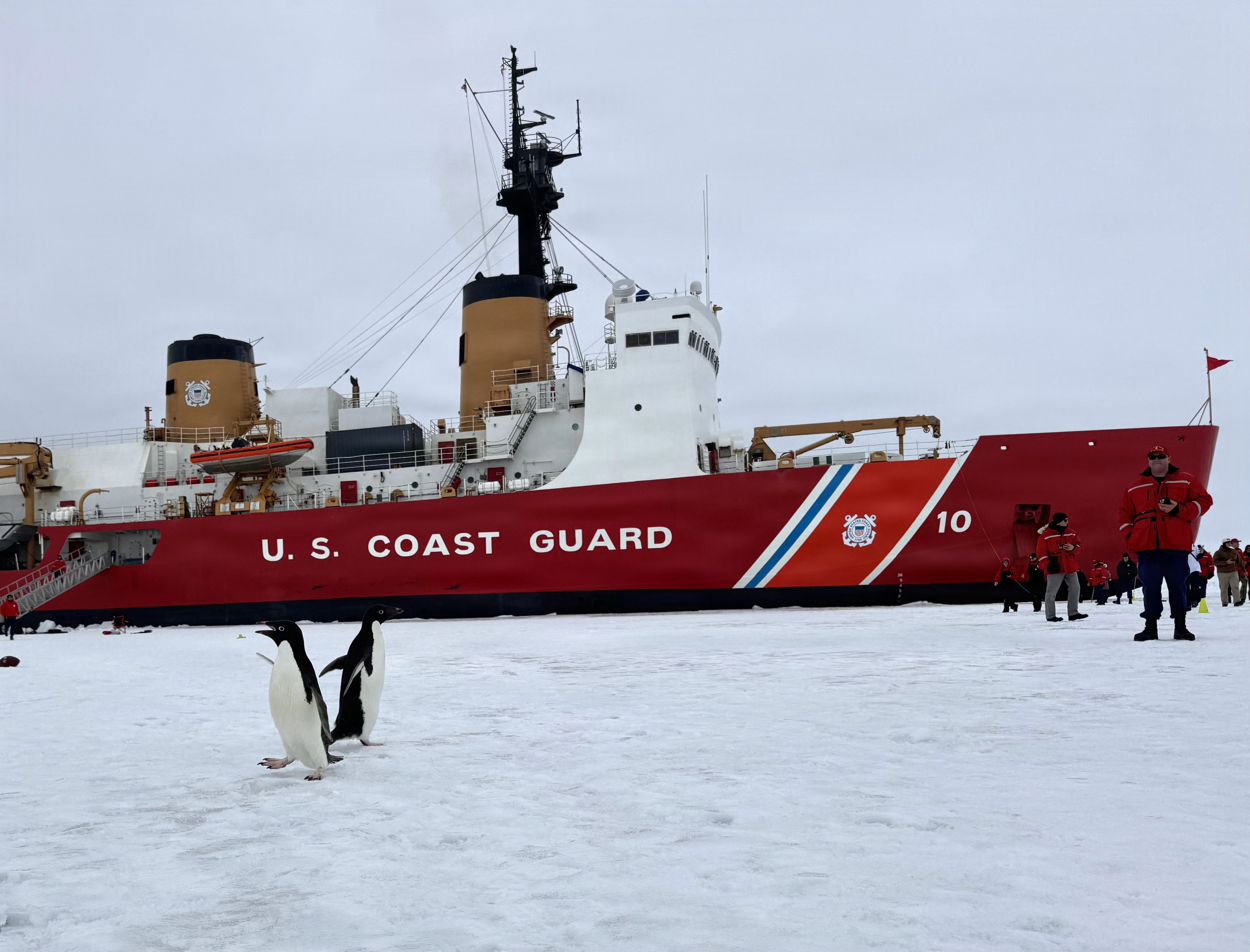
USCGC Polar Star celebrates 50 years amid Operation Deep Freeze.

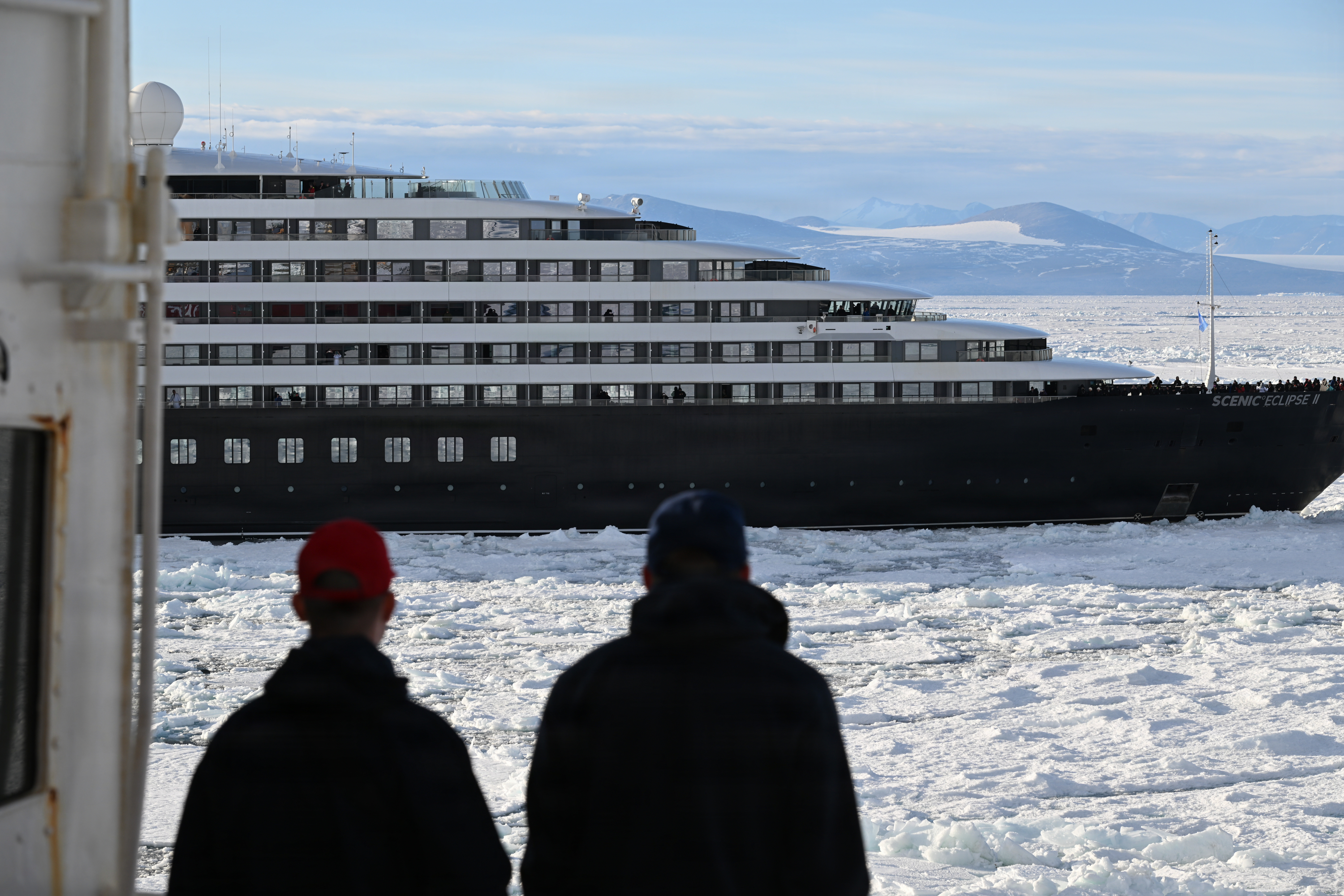
USCGC Polar Star escorts an Australian-owned cruise ship out of pack ice in the Ross Sea on 17 January 2026.

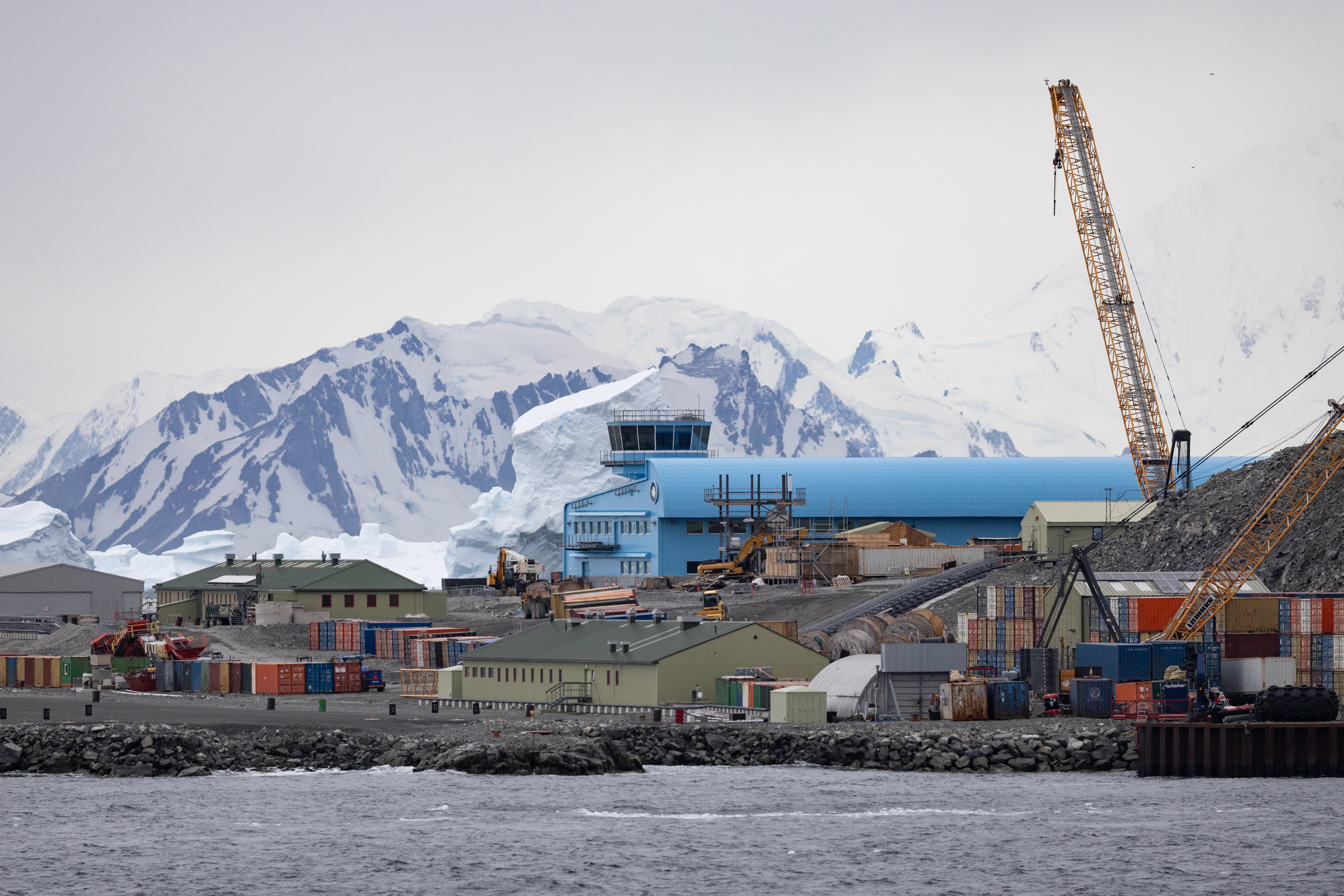
View of Rothera Research Station, Adelaide Island, Antarctic Peninsula, 25 January 2026

- 2 January – Glaciologist Heidi Sevestre and explorer Matthieu Tordeur reach the South pole on the 61st day of their ice mapping "Under Antarctica" snowkiting expedition.
- 4 January – The South Korean National Geographic Information Institute (NGII) announces 16 Korean names for geographic features around Jang Bogo Station, selected from proposals by the country's public for submission to the Composite Gazetteer of Antarctica.
- 5 January – NASA scientific balloon which carries Payload for Ultrahigh Energy Observations (PUEO) starts its ascent into the air, after its launch on 20 December 2025.
- 6 January
  - Astrobiologist Dale Andersen and his team fly aboard an IL-76TD from Cape Town to Novolazarevskaya Station before an overland traverse to their camp at Lake Untersee for research coordinated by the SETI Institute.
  - Participants of the 34th Bulgarian Antarctic expedition celebrate Epiphany at St. Kliment Ohridski Base, Livingston Island.
- 7 January
  - A new Australian ice core drill, designed by the Australian Antarctic Division for the Million Year Ice Core (MYIC) project, collects its first ice core at the Dome C North drilling site (1,200 km from Casey Station).
  - The South Korean icebreaker RV Araon with nearly 40 scientists aboard reaches the Thwaites glacier after a 12-day journey from New Zealand and its research campaign begins.
  - The Dutch-flagged heavy lift vessel Plantijngracht departs Port Hueneme, California with U.S. Military Sealift Command cargo for McMurdo Station.
- 8 January
  - The Bulgarian research vessel Sv. Sv. Kiril i Metodii visits the Spanish Gabriel de Castilla Base on Deception Island to deliver supplies.
  - A new group of logisticians arrives at the Bulgarian St. Kliment Ohridski Base after traveling by plane from Punta Arenas to King George Island and then aboard Sv. Sv. Kiril i Metodii.
  - U.S. National Ice Center estimates the remaining area of the iceberg A23a in early January at 1,182 square kilometers.
- 9 January
  - Colin O'Brady became the first person to cross the Ross Ice Shelf solo, unsupported, and fully human powered.
  - Scientists aboard the Australian icebreaker RSV Nuyina study wildlife and landscape of Heard Island on the vessel's second visit this season.
  - A planned call between Astrobiologist Dale Andersen in Antarctica and his friend and colleague Zena Cardman on the ISS cancelled after NASA decided to cut short the Crew-11 mission for medical reasons.
  - NASA's General AntiParticle Spectrometer (GAPS) balloon-borne experiment returns to ice after 25 days in flight.
- 11 January
  - Astrobiologist Dale Andersen and his team travel on snowmobiles from Novolazarevskaya Station to Lake Untersee.
  - The sailing research vessels Malizia Explorer and WHY (operated by the Under The Pole team) reunite near Western Antarctic Peninsula for a joint scientific expedition to study mesophotic ecosystems through deep diving.
- 12 January
  - U.S. Coast Guard's heavy icebreaker Polar Star is carving a path through ice in the McMurdo Sound on its 29th "Deep Freeze" deployment to allow ships to resupply McMurdo Station.
  - NASA's Payload for Ultrahigh Energy Observations (PUEO) balloon-borne experiment returns to ice after 23 days in flight.
- 13 January – Scientists aboard the Australian icebreaker RSV Nuyina return to Heard Island after an enforced absence due to the weather.
- 14 January
  - Search underway for a missing diver working for the French Polar Institute at Adélie Land.
  - The Ice Memory Foundation opens its ice core archive at Concordia Station in Antarctica, storing the first samples from glaciers on Grand Combin, Switzerland and Mont Blanc, France. The samples traveled from Trieste for more than 50 days aboard the Italian icebreaker Laura Bassi.
  - The "Under Antarctica" expeditioners Heidi Sevestre and Matthieu Tordeur skirt the Thiel Mountains on their way from the South Pole to Hercules inlet, while mapping deep ice layers using radar on pulkas.
- 15 January – Researchers from Université Grenoble-Alpes, University of Edinburgh, and Dartmouth College publish a new detailed map of Antarctica's subglacial topography based on satellite measurements of ice surface and known interactions between ice and bedrock. Among the newly documented features is a large trench carved into the Maud Subglacial Basin. The work is published in Science.
- 16 January
  - The South Korean icebreaker RV Araon visits Pine Island Glacier.
  - Researchers from Masaryk University and Mendel University leave Czechia for a journey to Mendel Polar Station.
  - Colombia's research vessel ARC Simon Bolivar reaches Antarctica as part of the XII Colombian Scientific Expedition.
- 16 to 20 January – A team of U.S. government officials conduct inspections of other nations' research stations in Antarctica.
- 17 January
  - A group of scientists, medical staff, and logisticians from the Spanish Juan Carlos I Base visit the Bulgarian St. Kliment Ohridski Base to discuss future collaboration and mutual assistance if needed.
  - Lake Untersee base camp is completed by the astrobiological team led by Dale Andersen.
  - USCG Polar Star frees the cruise ship Scenic Eclipse II from pack ice near McMurdo Sound.
- 18 January
  - The French icebreaker L'Astrolabe departs Hobart to help with the search for the missing diver near Dumont d'Urville Station.
  - The "Under Antarctica" expeditioners Heidi Sevestre and Matthieu Tordeur report passing by the refueling point at Thiel Corner and later by the Brazilian scientific station Criosfera 1 on their way toward Hercules Inlet.
- 19 January – Scientists from RV Araon set up camp on Thwaites Glacier.
- 21 January
  - At 19:50 UTC, the "Under Antarctica" expeditioners Heidi Sevestre and Matthieu Tordeur arrive at Hercules Inlet, completing their 80-days-long snowkiting expedition dedicated to mapping the ice with ground-penetrating radar.
  - The National Antarctic Scientific Center of Ukraine announces that meteorologist Anzhelika Hanchuk (Анжеліка Ганчук) will become the first woman to lead a year-long expedition at Vernadsky Research Base, the 31st Ukrainian Antarctic Expedition in 2026–2027.
- 22 January – Ukrainian scientists at Vernadsky Research Base celebrate Unity of Ukraine Day.
- 24 January – French Polar Institute confirms that the body of Gérald Malaussena, the diver missing since 13 January near Dumont d'Urville Station, has been found thanks to assistance by US Coast Guard.
- 25 January
  - Australian icebreaker RSV Nuyina departs Heard Island after concluding its second research visit this season.
  - NASA's PACE satellite detects plumes of chlorophyll a around the remains of the iceberg A23a, interpreted as phytoplankton bloom connected to the conditions created by the iceberg.
- 26 January – The National Antarctic Scientific Center of Ukraine launches the country's first polar biology laboratory dedicated to analyzing biological samples from Antarctica.
- 27 January – Turkey launches its 10th National Antarctic Scientific Expedition with a farewell ceremony at Istanbul Airport.
- 29 January
  - RAF and the Chilean Air Force conclude the operation "Austral Endurance" which included A400M flights over British Antarctic Survey sites and cooperation with RRS Sir David Attenborough in the Antarctic.
  - Researches from BAS and KOPRI establish their drill site on Thwaites Glacier after over 40 helicopter rotations between RV Araon and the glacier.
- 30 January – Argentina's logistics ship ARA Patagonia is being resupplied in Buenos Aires, marking the "practical start" of the country's 122nd Antarctic Summer Campaign.
- 31 January
  - After melting a hole through Thwaites Glacier, researches from BAS and KOPRI manage to take measurements from the sea water below using temporary instruments but fail to install the planned long-term measuring instruments that would monitor the sub-glacier environment for one to two years.
  - Ukrainian icebreaker Noosfera departs Punta Arenas, carrying members of the first Mexican Antarctic research campaign CAMEX-1 to Vernadsky Station. This mission marks Mexico's integration into the Scientific Committee on Antarctic Research (SCAR).
- January – Six new sensor strings with over 650 photodetectors and calibration devices added to the IceCube Neutrino Observatory at Amundsen–Scott South Pole Station.

== February ==
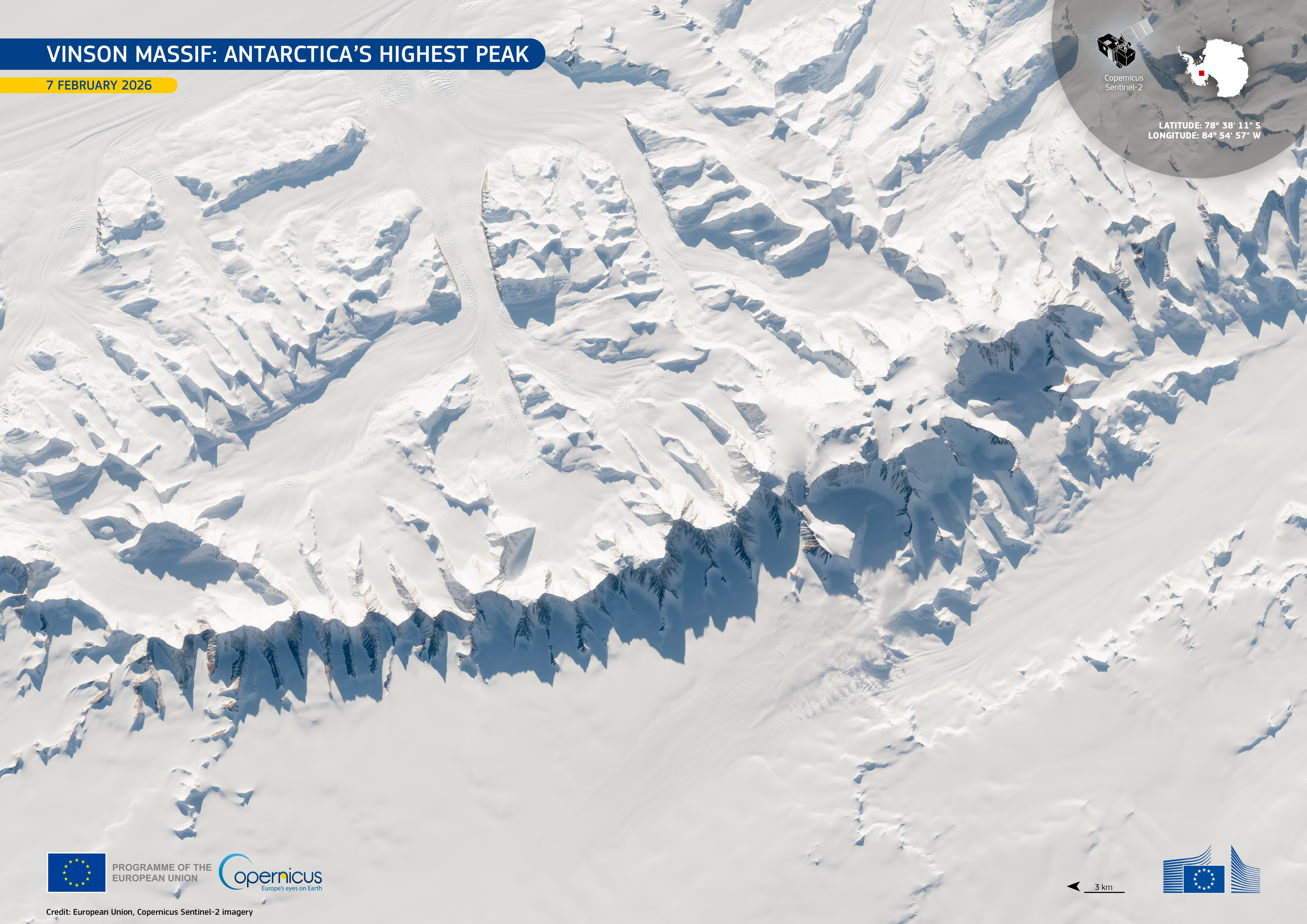
Vinson Massif imaged by the EU's Copernicus Programme Sentinel-2 satellite on 7 February 2026

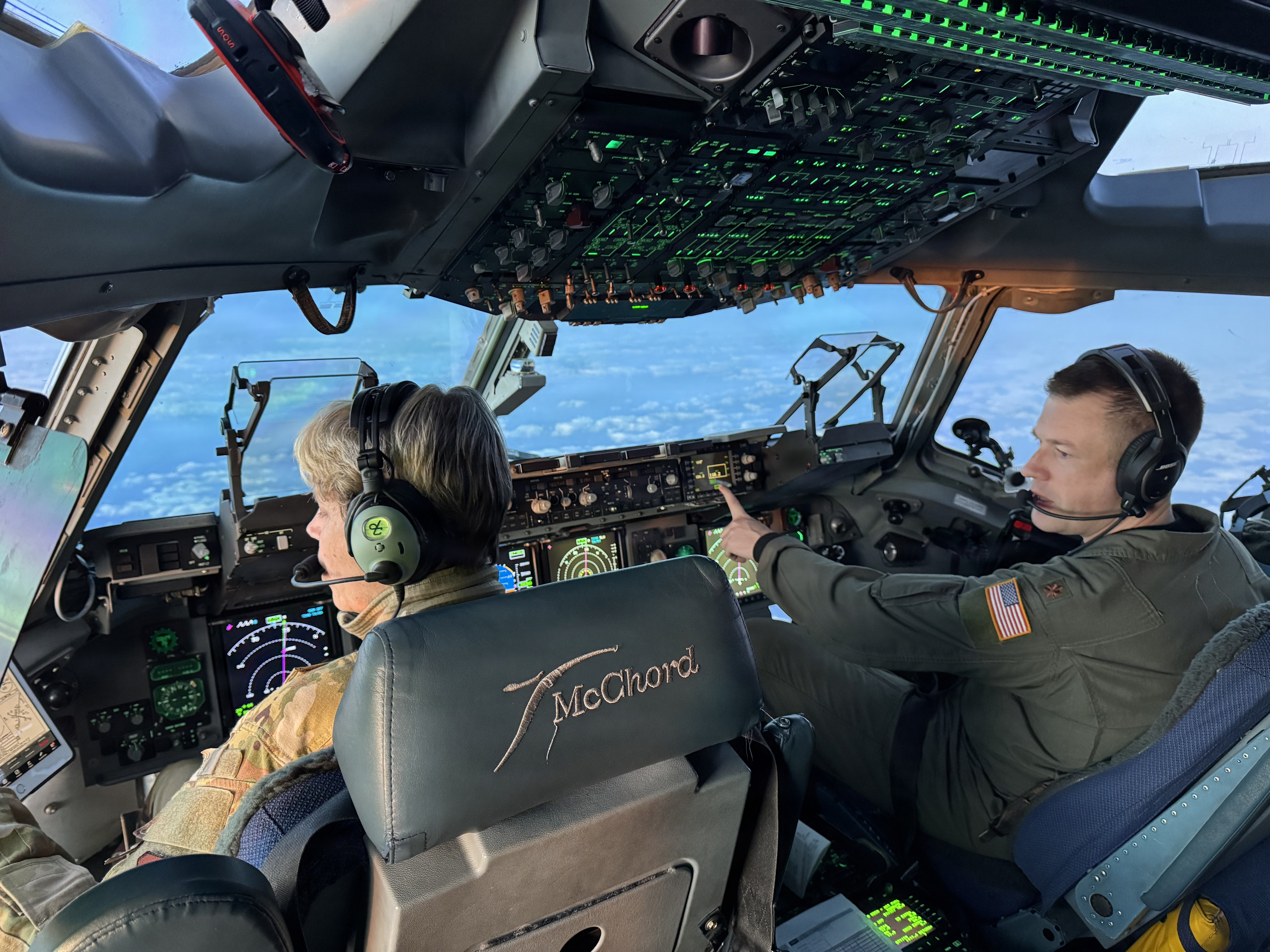
U.S. Air Force Lt. Gen. Rebecca Sonkiss flies a C-17 Globemaster III to Antarctica, 8 February 2026

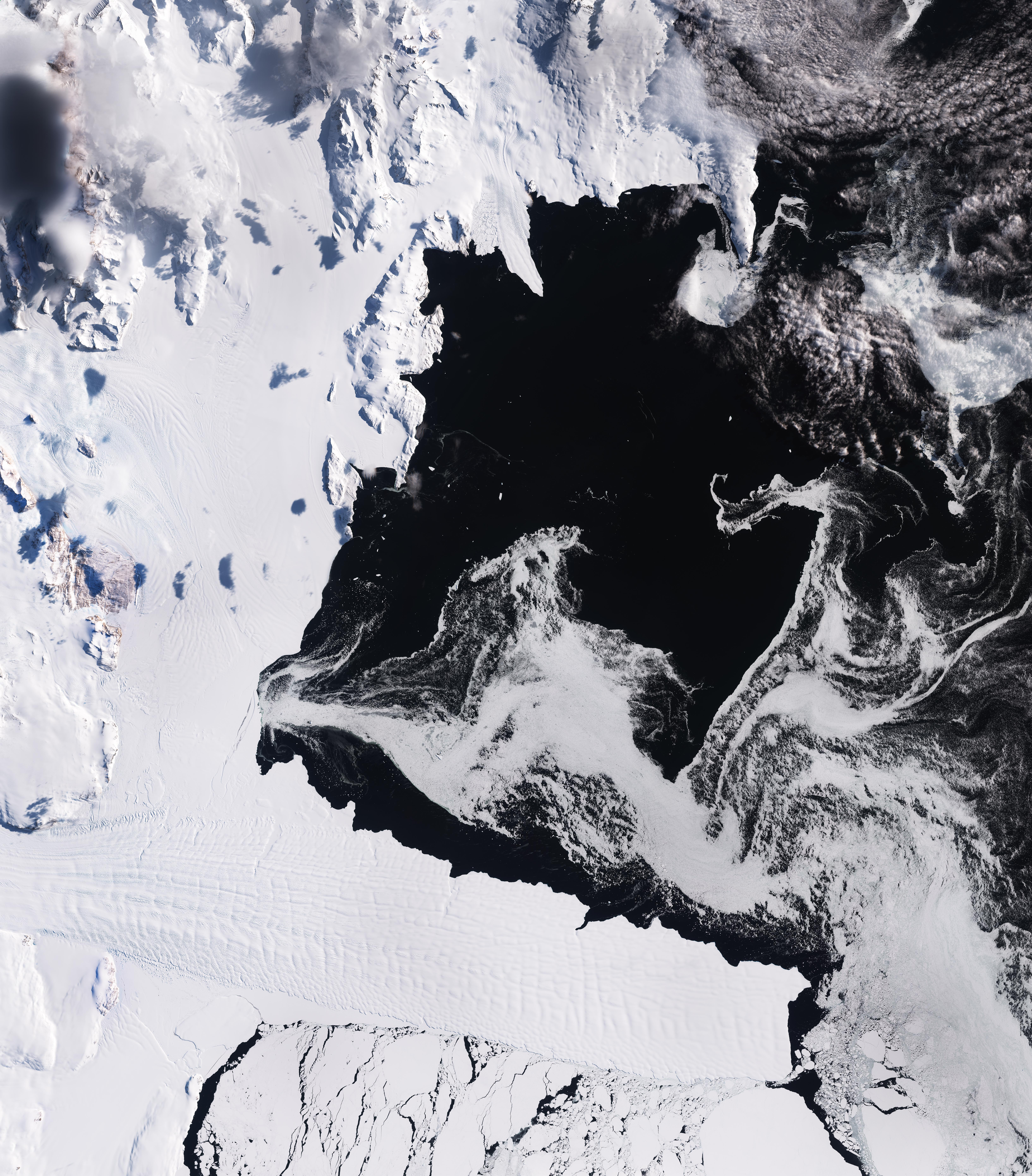
Copernicus Programme Sentinel-2 satellite image of Terra Nova Bay taken on 14 February 2026, showing minimum seasonal sea-ice conditions

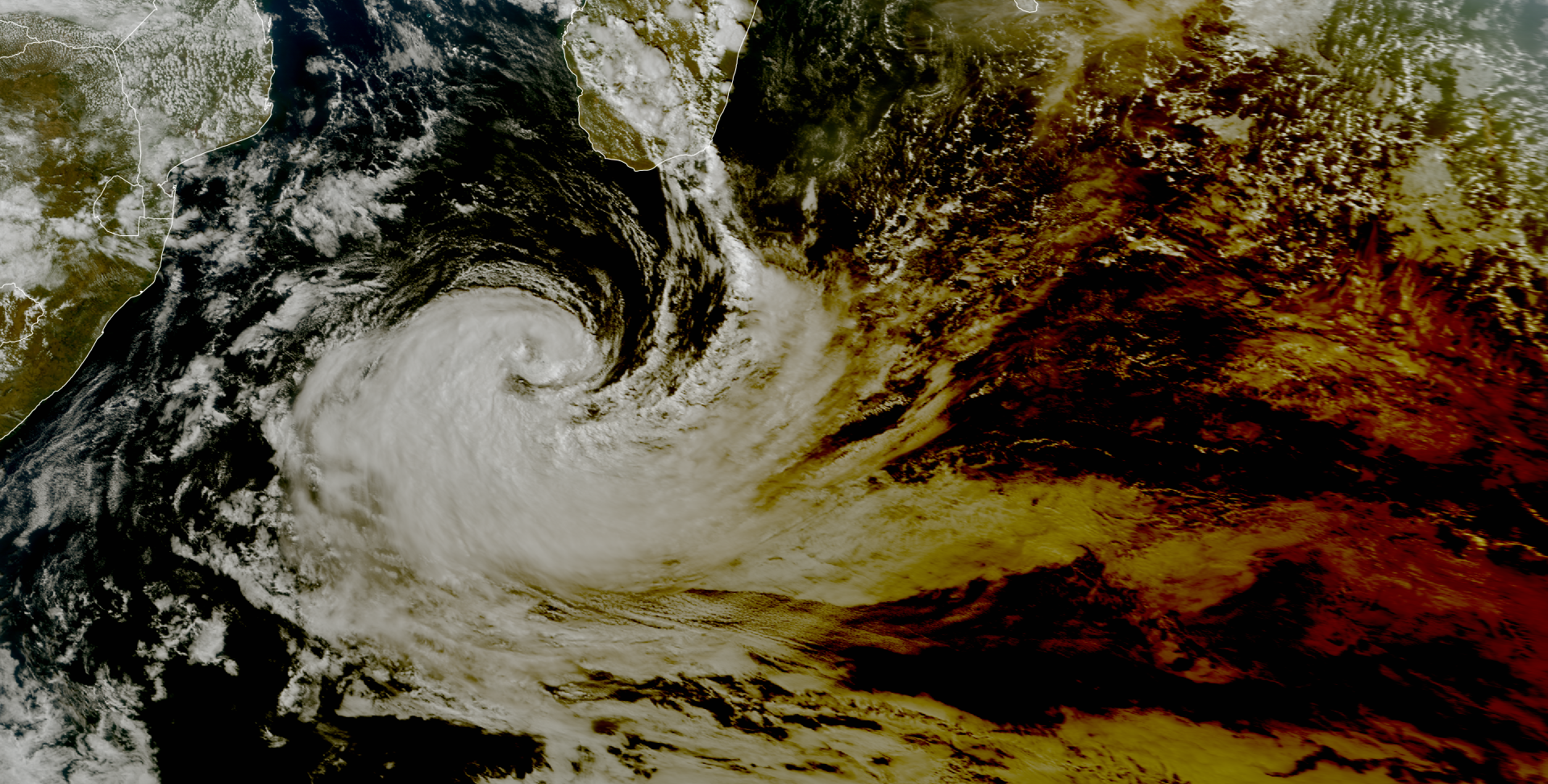
Cyclone Gezani over Indian Ocean and Solar Eclipse over Antarctica, 17 February 2026

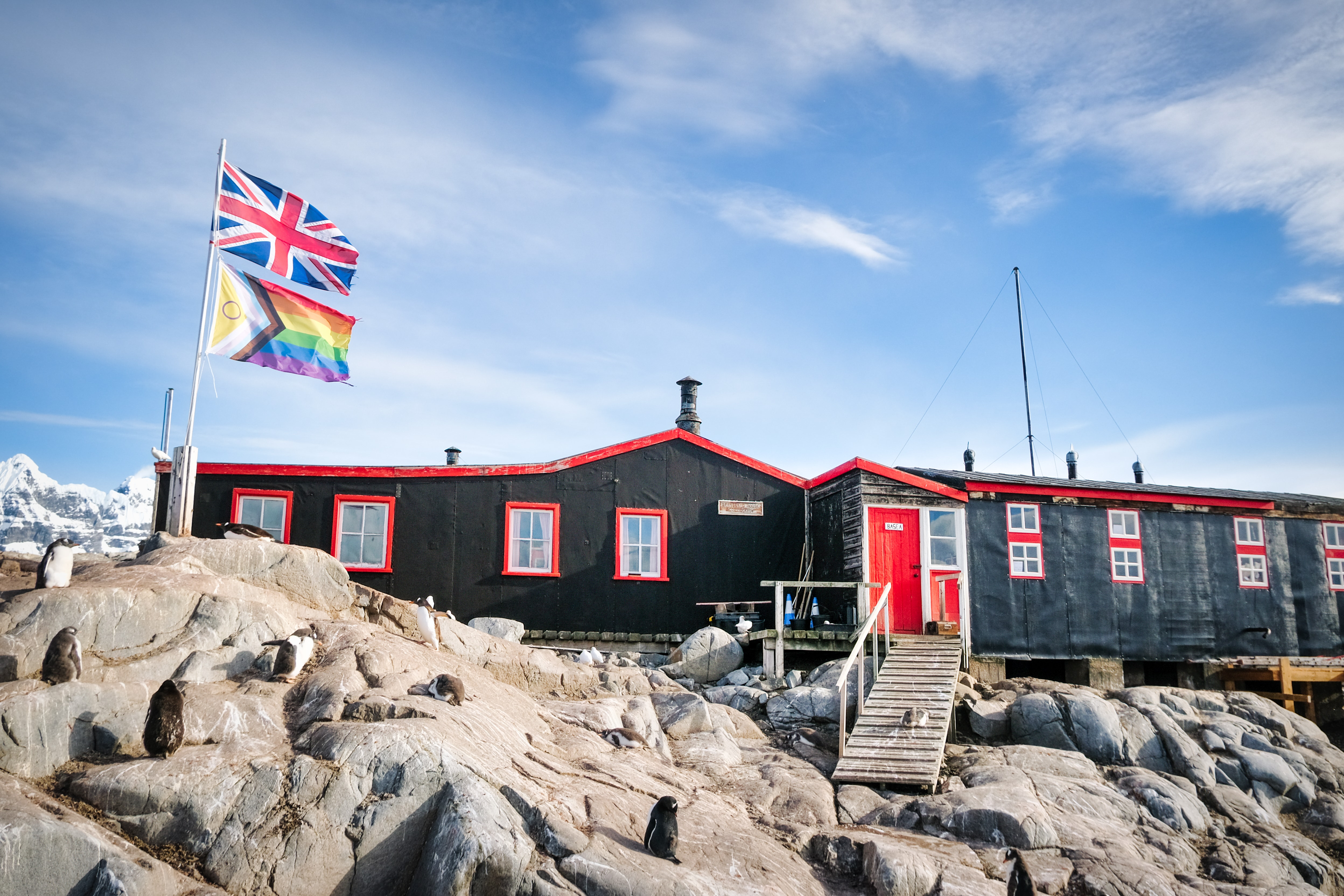
Progress pride flag flying alongside the British flag on Goudier island, Port Lockroy, 19 February 2026

- 1 February – The fourth group of participants in Bulgaria's 34th Antarctic Expedition arrives at St. Kliment Ohridski Base.
- 2 February – The 10th Turkish Antarctic Expedition visits Sv. Sv. Kiril i Metodii and St. Kliment Ohridski Base before continuing its journey to Horseshoe Island for geology research.
- 3 February – The Bulgarian research vessel Sv. Sv. Kiril i Metodii visits the Hannah Point peninsula for collection of scientific samples.
- 4 February – The Dutch-flagged heavy lift vessel Plantijngracht with U.S. Military Sealift Command cargo arrives at McMurdo Station as part of Operation Deep Freeze 2026.
- 6 February
  - Ukraine celebrates 30 years since the transfer of Vernadsky research base from the UK.
  - Bulgarian scientists aboard Sv. Sv. Kiril i Metodii discover remains of an Argentine aircraft that crashed in 1976 on Bernard Point, Livingston Island. A ceremony is held aboard the vessel to pay tribute to the fallen servicemen.
- 7 February – The Bulgarian research vessel Sv. Sv. Kiril i Metodii reaches shores of the Antarctic mainland for the first time while visiting Argentina's Esperanza Base in Hope Bay on the Antarctic Peninsula.
- 8 February – The 10th Turkish Antarctic Expedition arrives at the Turkish Antarctic Research Station on Horseshoe Island.
- 11 February – First scientific dive ever from the Bulgarian St. Kliment Ohridski Base is conducted by Greek oceanologists Dionysia Rigatou and Eleni Kytinou.
- 10 February
  - An Australian deep-sea camera near South Shetland Islands captures video of a sleeper shark, the first video of any shark in the Southern Ocean in a natural setting.
  - China concludes a 75-day Antarctic testing mission of its new domestically developed "Snow Leopard" 6×6 polar vehicle.
  - A meteorological and seismological laboratory of the United Arab Emirates is inaugurated at the Bulgarian St. Kliment Ohridski Base.
- 12 February
  - The second drilling season of the Australian Million Year Ice Core (MYIC) project at Dome C North concludes after successful 400 m deep drilling, which recovered 13,100 years old ice samples representing the end of the Last Glacial Period.
  - Admiral Stephen Koehler, commander of U.S. Pacific Fleet, visits McMurdo station.
- 13 February – Russia celebrates the 70th anniversary of Mirny, the first Soviet Antarctic station.
- 17 February
  - Annular Solar eclipse of February 17, 2026 is visible in Antarctica.
  - Sv. Sv. Kiril i Metodii departs Livingston Island for its journey back to Bulgaria via Argentina.
- 18 February – The SWAIS2C (Sensitivity of the West Antarctic Ice Sheet to 2°C) project recovers the longest-ever sediment core from under an ice sheet (228 m of sediment from under 523 m of ice) at a deep-field camp at Crary Ice Rise.
- 23 February – Sv. Sv. Kiril i Metodii docks at the port of Antonio Moran, Comodoro Rivadavia, Argentina on its way from Antarctica back to Bulgaria.
- 24 February – The 31st Ukrainian Antarctic Expedition, led by meteorologist Anzhelika Hanchuk, departs Kyiv.
- 25 February – Astrobiologist Dale Andersen and his team return to Cape Town after completing spring field season at Lake Untersee.
- 26 February – The new permanent docking pier, designed to replace the previous seasonal ice pier, arrives at McMurdo Station.
- 27 February – ABC reports that at the Australian Casey Station, expeditioners have grown 130 kg of vegetables and herbs using the station's hydroponics facility over the preceding 12 months.
- February – Ukraine declares its Antarctic presence a "platform for protecting national interests", strengthening the country's "national security".

== March ==
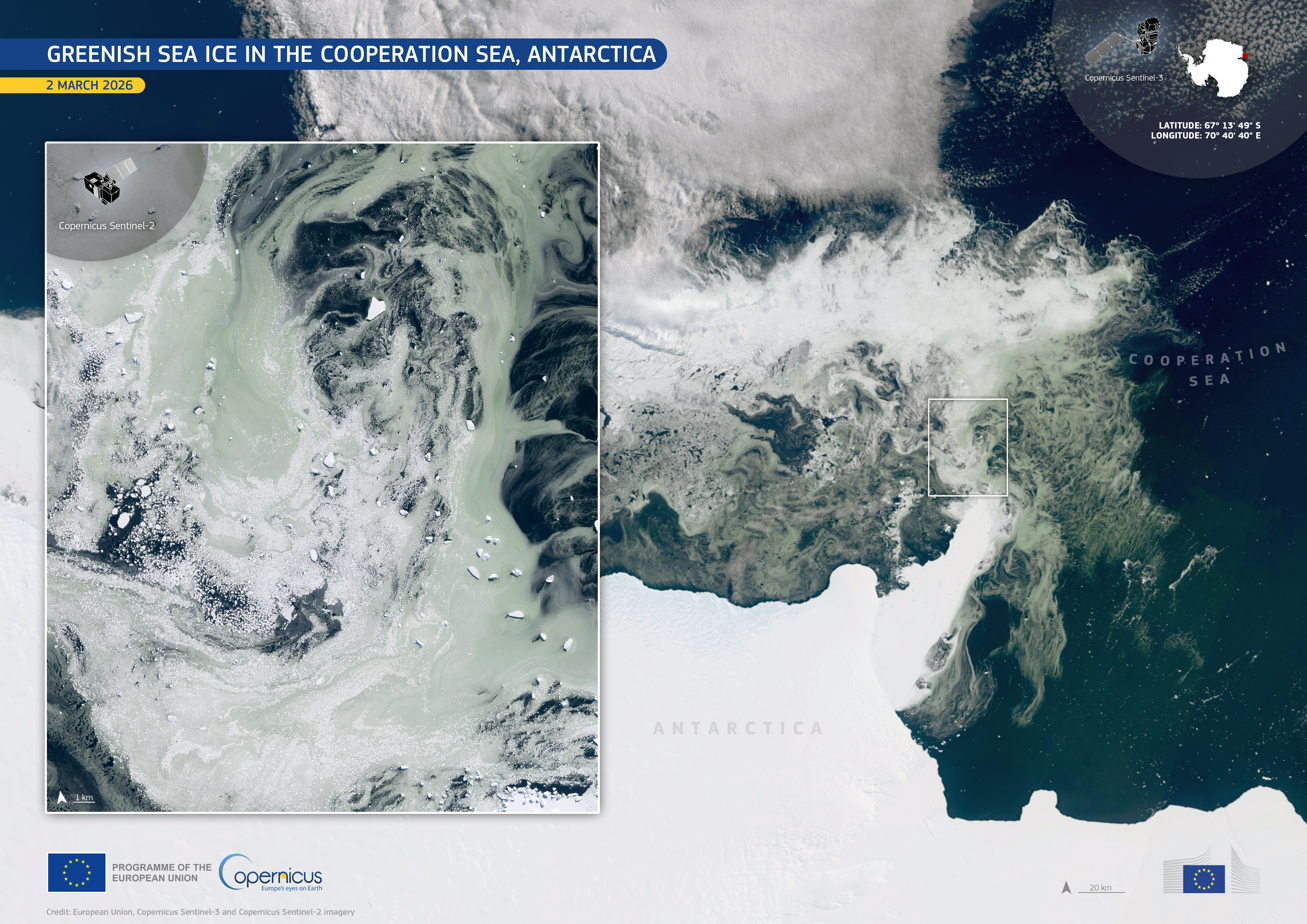
Seasonal algal blooms in the Cooperation Sea by Sentinel-2 and Sentinel-3 on 2 March 2026

- 1 March – The U.S. Coast Guard Cutter Polar Star departs McMurdo Sound, concluding its deployment in support of Operation Deep Freeze 2026.
- 3 March – The 31st Ukrainian Antarctic Expedition arrives at Vernadsky station.
- 5 March – BBC reports that the iceberg A23a has shrunk to approximately 180 square km.
- 6 March – Italian icebreaker RV Laura Bassi returns to the port of Lyttelton, New Zealand, concluding the 41st Italian scientific expedition to Antarctica.
- 13 March – The Australian Antarctic Program completes its first environmental management and research voyages to Heard Island and McDonald Islands in 20 years.
- 31 March – The Ukrainian icebreaker Noosfera delivers an expedition team and cargo to the British Rothera Research Station as part of a new collaboration between the British Antarctic Survey and the National Antarctic Scientific Center of Ukraine.

== April ==
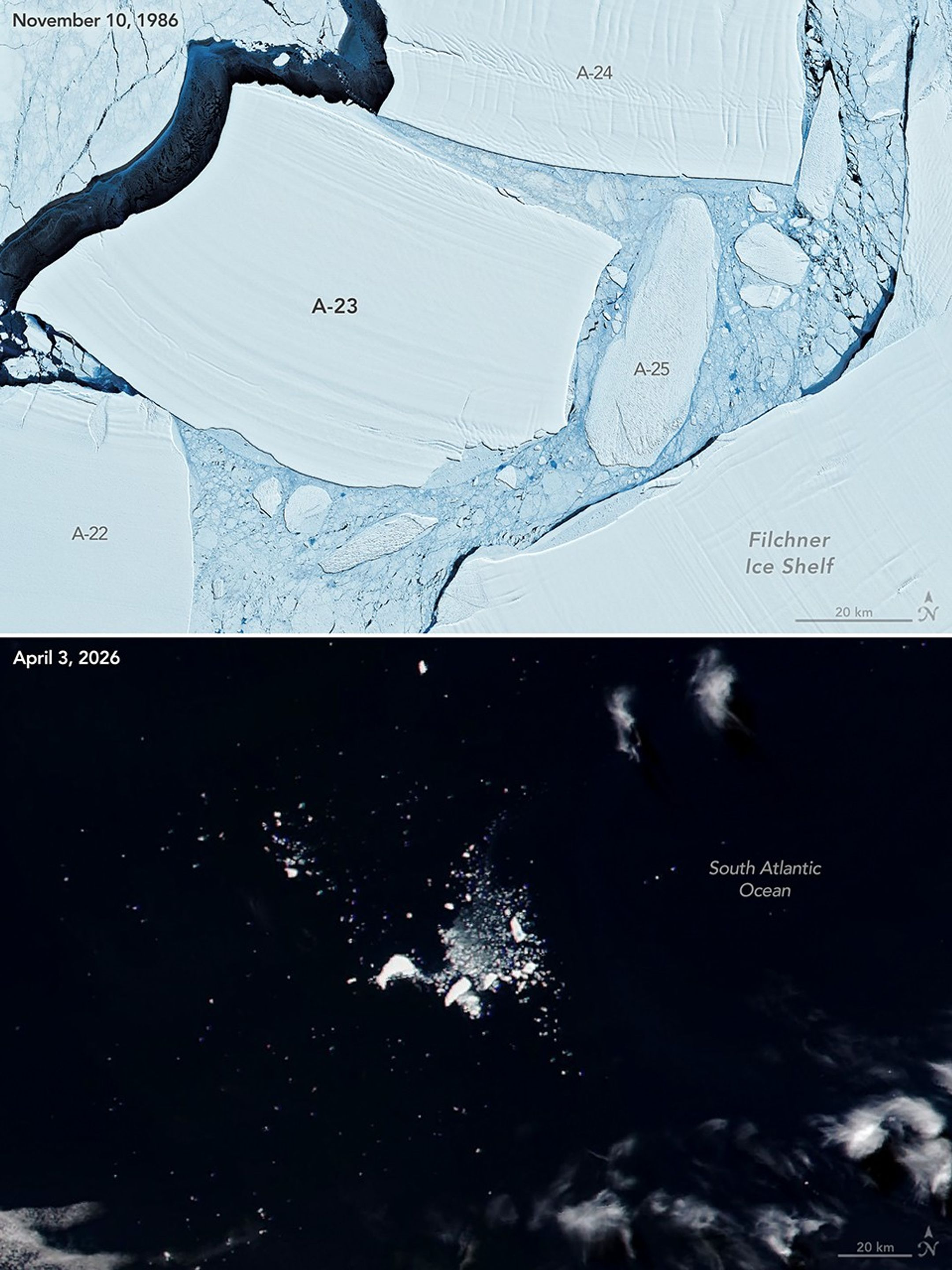
Comparison of A23a in 1986 and on 3 April 2026

- 1 April – The MV Bandero, operated by the Captain Paul Watson Foundation, collides with a Norwegian-flagged krill trawler Antarctic Sea, operated by the Aker Qrill Company, off Antarctica.
- 2 April – The Australian Antarctic Division awards contracts for the Macquarie Island Station Project, leading to a new research station on Macquarie Island.
- 9 April – Sv. Sv. Kiril i Metodii arrives in Varna, concluding Bulgaria's 34th Antarctic expedition.
- 13 April – Korea Polar Research Institute researchers at Jang Bogo Station report a violent incident among the crew. The suspect is then transported back to South Korea on 7 May.
- 16 April – Government of Japan announces that the successor vessel of the icebreaker Shirase will be operated by JAMSTEC instead of the Maritime Self-Defense Force.
- Late April – The Royal New Zealand Air Force performs a successful medical evacuation from McMurdo Station to Christchurch using a C-130J Hercules transport aircraft.
- April – MV Hondius hantavirus outbreak on an Antarctic cruise ship.

== May ==
- 1 May – The South African icebreaker S. A. Agulhas II, preparing for a mission to the sub-Antarctic Marion Research Station, receives a shipment of polar diesel fuel after a several weeks delay caused by the 2026 Iran war.
- 11–21 May – Japan hosts the 48th Antarctic Treaty Consultative Meeting and the 28th Meeting of the Committee for Environmental Protection at the International Conference Center Hiroshima.
- 14 May – S. A. Agulhas II departs Cape Town on a mission to evacuate the overwintering team from the sub-Antarctic Marion Island base. The evacuation was forced by delays in fuel deliveries caused by the 2026 Iran war. The ship's arrival at the base is expected on 18 May.

== September ==
- 14 September – Antarctic sea ice reaches an annual maximum extent of 17.59 million square kilometres (6.79 million sq mi), the third-lowest winter peak in the satellite record.

== See also ==
- 2026 in science
- 2026 in spaceflight
- 2026 in climate change
- 2026 in the environment
- Southern Ocean
- South Pole
- Antarctic ice sheet
