= 2026 in the environment =

2026 in the environment is a list of significant environmental events, initiatives, policy milestones, and related meetings that occurred (or are scheduled to occur) in 2026.

== Events ==
=== January ===
- 5 January – 13 February – Nominations period for experts to participate in the Open-Ended Online Forum on Synthetic Biology (Convention on Biological Diversity process).
- 6 January – Lisima Lya Mwono in Angola recognized as Ramsar Wetlands of International Importance.
- 17 January – The Agreement under the United Nations Convention on the Law of the Sea on the Conservation and Sustainable Use of Marine Biological Diversity of Areas beyond National Jurisdiction (the BBNJ Agreement, also known as the High Seas Treaty) enters into force.
- 19 January – Nature reserve "Jistebnické mokřady" established in Poodří Protected Landscape Area, Czechia.
- 25 January – One-day stakeholder meeting in Dakar, Senegal, held in connection with preparations for the 2026 UN Water Conference.
- 26–27 January – High-level preparatory meeting for the 2026 UN Water Conference held in Dakar, Senegal (co-hosted by Senegal and the United Arab Emirates).

=== February ===
- 4 February
  - Black coal mining ended in Czechia after nearly 250 years.
  - Barnebey Woods in Owen County, Indiana, US, designated as the state's newest nature preserve. The upland forest area is owned and managed by Sycamore Land Trust.
- 23 February – 6 March – Open-Ended Online Forum on Synthetic Biology (Convention on Biological Diversity process).

=== March ===
- 24–27 March – The Intergovernmental Panel on Climate Change held its 64th plenary session in Bangkok, where member governments approved the work programme for the Task Group on Data Support for Climate Change Assessments and postponed a decision on the Seventh Assessment Report schedule.

=== May ===
- 11–21 May – The 48th Antarctic Treaty Consultative Meeting and the 28th Meeting of the Committee for Environmental Protection took place in Hiroshima, Japan.

=== June ===
- 8–18 June – The 64th sessions of the UNFCCC Subsidiary Body for Scientific and Technological Advice and the Subsidiary Body for Implementation (SB64) were held at the World Conference Center Bonn in Bonn, Germany.
- 16–18 June – The 11th Our Ocean Conference, the first edition hosted in Africa, took place in Kenya's Mombasa and Kilifi counties and secured US$7.5 billion in marine conservation pledges.

=== August ===
- 17–28 August – Held in Ulaanbaatar, Mongolia, the 17th session of the Conference of the Parties to the United Nations Convention to Combat Desertification (COP17) focused on drought resilience and rangeland conservation.

=== October ===
- 19–30 October – Held in Yerevan, Armenia, the 17th meeting of the Conference of the Parties to the Convention on Biological Diversity (CBD COP17) carried out the first global review of the Kunming–Montreal Global Biodiversity Framework, adopted the Yerevan Pathway, and secured US$1.8 billion in pledges.

=== November ===
- 9–20 November – The 2026 United Nations Climate Change Conference (COP31) is taking place in Antalya, Turkey, addressing the second Global Stocktake.
- 17–20 November – The 7th World Conference on Marine Biodiversity (WCMB 2026) is being held in Bruges, Belgium.

=== December ===
- 8–10 December – The 2026 United Nations Water Conference is scheduled to be held in Abu Dhabi, United Arab Emirates (UAE), co-hosted by Senegal and the UAE.

== Deaths ==
- 7 January – Madhav Gadgil, Indian ecologist.

== See also ==
- 2026
- 2026 in science
- 2026 in Antarctica
- 2026 in climate change
- 2020s in environmental history
- Wildfires in 2026
