= Hong Kum Lee =

Korean Antarctic researcher

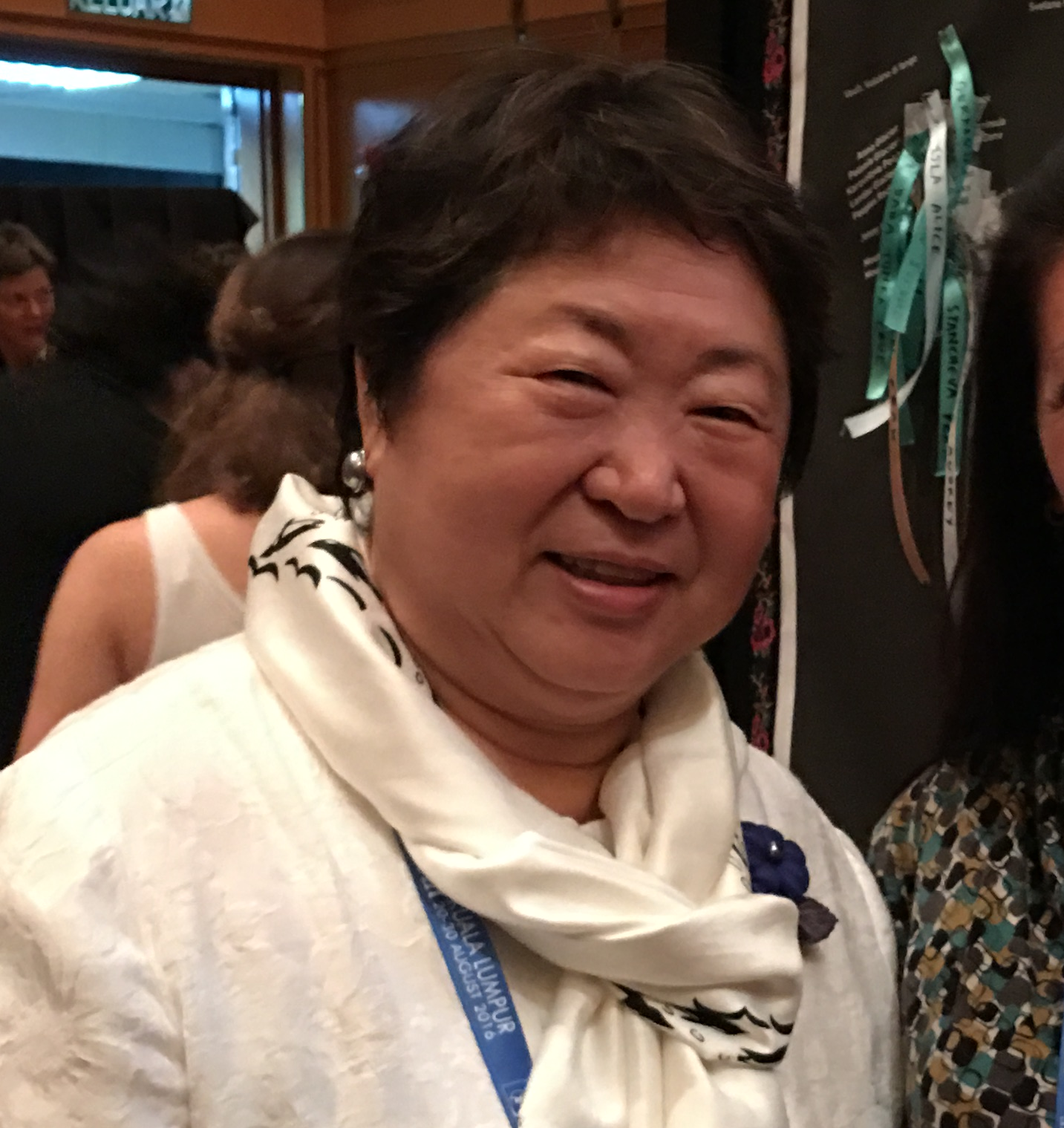
- Prof Hong Kum Lee
- Education: TU Braunschweig
- Known for: Director General, Korea Polar Research Institute
- Awards: Hyeosin Medal Order of Science and Technology Merit
- Scientific career
- Fields: Polar microbial diversity marine biotechnology
- Workplaces: Korea Polar Research Institute (KOPRI)

Korean name
- Hangul: 이홍금
- RR: I Honggeum
- MR: I Honggŭm

Hong Kum Lee is an Antarctic researcher, best known for work as the Director General of the Korea Polar Research Institute (KOPRI).

== Early life and education ==
Lee graduated from Seoul National University in microbiology and received her PhD degree at TU Braunschweig, Germany in 1989. She completed a postdoc at the Seoul National University in 1990 and was then made a principal research scientist at Korea Ocean Research Institute (KORDI) from 1991 to 2004. She was head of national research laboratory for marine microbial diversity from 2001 to 2005. Since 2004 she is a principal research scientist at the Korea Polar Research Institute (KOPRI).

== Career and impact ==
As President of KOPRI during 2007–2013 she was active in enhancing polar research infra-structure and strengthening international cooperation. She supported construction of South Korea's first research icebreaker, RV Araon, delivered in 2009. Araon equipped with state-of-the–art research facilities conducts multidisciplinary scientific research in geophysics and geology, oceanography and biology. As Chair of Local Organizing Committee, she devoted herself to the ASSW 2011(Arctic Science Summit Week 2011) held in Seoul.

She also supported the construction of the Jang-Bogo Antarctic Research Station in Terra Nova Bay of Northern Victoria Land in Antarctica, which was completed in 2014. As a year-round station, Jang-Bogo Station serves as a platform for the research on climate change and developing the West Antarctic observatory network. As a member of IASC (International Arctic Science Committee) Review Committee from 2014 to 2015, she was appointed to carry out a review of progress for the period 2006–2016, including progress in implementing the recommendations of the 2006 Review Committee, and to recommend strategies for the future. She joined ICSU RCAP (International Council of Science, Regional Committee for Asia and the Pacific) from 2009 to 2014. As Chair of ICSU RCAP during 2011–2014, she participated in the implementation of the ICSU Strategic Plan 2012–2017, and in developing Future Earth in Asia and the Pacific. As an expert in marine and polar microbial diversity, she has strengthened her research activity as the head of National Research Laboratories for Marine Microbial Diversity, Ministry of Science and Technology. Not only reporting new microbial species, she has also screened and developed microbial exopolysaccharides and small molecules, which revealed biological activities such as antiviral, antioxidant activities and red tide algae-killing activities. She published more than 100 SCI papers and 25 patents.

Lee established and operates the Polar and Alpine Microbial Collection (PAMC), which shares biodiversity information and research bio-resources collected from polar and alpine areas. Approximately 2,800 microbial strains maintained in PAMC are ready to be provided in science and public communities with information on taxonomy, geographical origin, habitat and physiological characterization. PAMC was registered to international networks, the World Federation of Culture Collection (WFCC) and now functioning as an official depository institution.

== Awards and honours ==
Lee was awarded the Korea L'Oréal-UNESCO Award for Women in Science in Biological Sciences in 2007. She was also awarded the Woman Scientist/Engineer of the Year Award by South Korea's Ministry of Science, ICT and Future Planning in 2015. Lee also was awarded the Hyeosin Medal Order of Science and Technology Merit by the President of South Korea in 2016.

== Selected works ==
- Yim, Joung Han; Kim, Sung Jin; Ahn, Se Hun; Lee, Hong Kum (2007) Characterization of a novel bioflocculant, p-KG03, from a marine dinoflagellate, Gyrodinium impudicum KG03", Bioresource Technology 98(2):361-367
- Lee, Yoo Kyung; Lee, Jung-Hyun; Lee, Hong Kum (2001) Microbial symbiosis in marine sponges Journal of Microbiology 39(4):254-264
- Jeong, Haeyoung; Yim, Joung Han; Lee, Choonghwan; Choi, Sang-Haeng; Park, Yon Kyoung; Yoon, Sung Ho; Hur, Cheol-Goo; Kang, Ho-Young; Kim, Dockyu; Lee, Hyun Hee (2005) Genomic blueprint of Hahella chejuensis, a marine microbe producing an algicidal agent. Nucleic Acids Research 33(22)7066-7073
- Yim, Joung Han; Kim, Sung Jin; Ahn, Se Hun; Lee, Chong Kyo; Rhie, Ki Tae; Lee, Hong Kum (2004) Antiviral effects of sulfated exopolysaccharide from the marine microalga Gyrodinium impudicum strain KG03, Marine biotechnology 6(1):17-25.

== See also ==
- In-Young Ahn
