= Lee Sang-mook =

South Korean marine geologist and computational scientist (born 1962)

Sang-Mook Lee
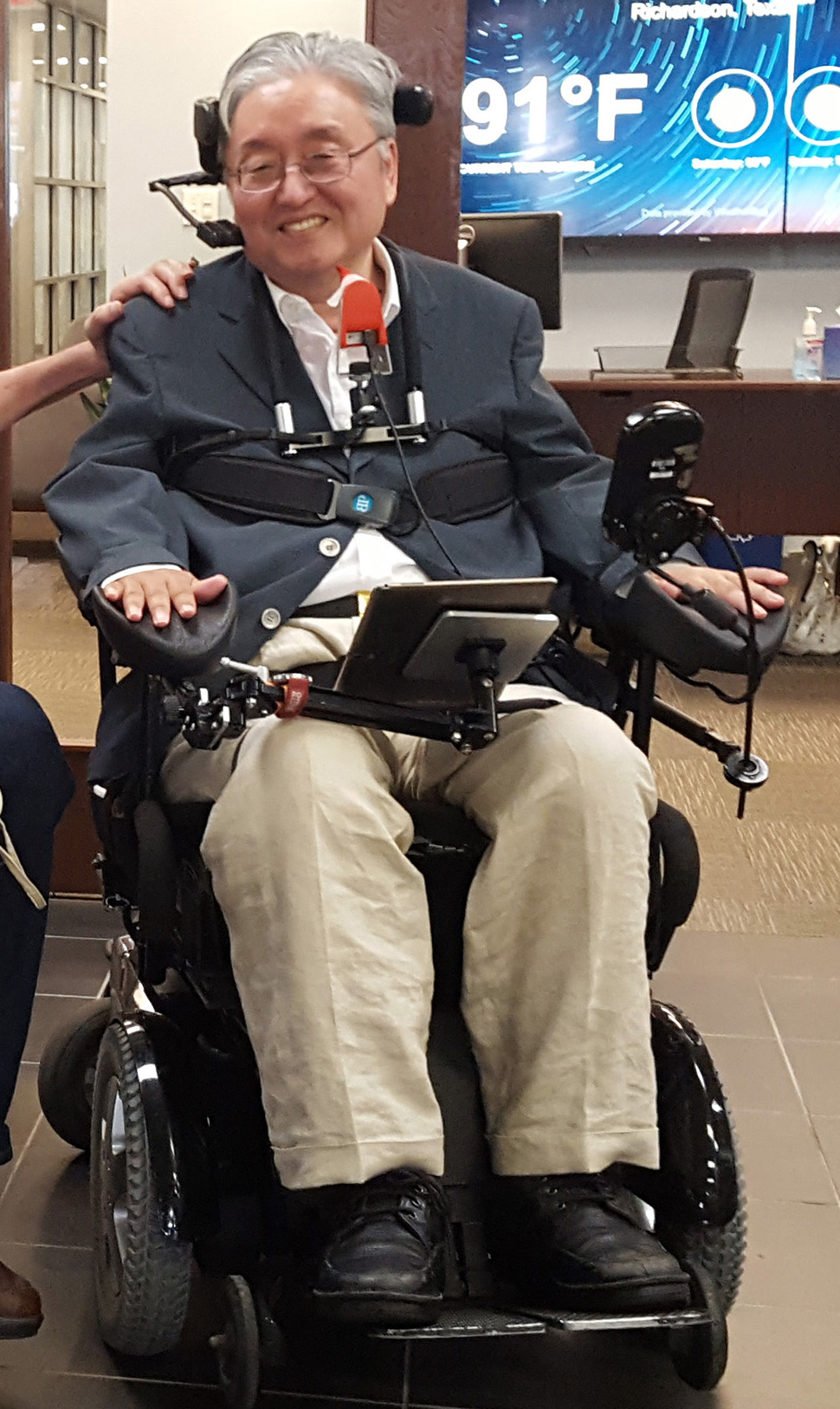
- Sang-Mook Lee in 2019.
- Born: October 18, 1962 (age 63); Seoul, South Korea
- Education: Seoul National University; Massachusetts Institute of Technology
- Occupation: Professor
- Employer: Seoul National University
- Known for: Korean "Steve Hawking". Scientist. Professor of Seoul National University
- Title: Dean, Graduate School of Convergence Science and Technology, SNU

Korean name
- Hangul: 이상묵
- Hanja: 李尙默
- RR: I Sangmuk
- MR: I Sangmuk
- Website: qolt homepage

External videos
- The INNERview - #40 Lee Sang-mook(이상묵), "Oceanography Professor at Seoul National University"

Lee Sang-Mook (born October 18, 1962) is a South Korean marine geologist and computational scientist. He has worked as a researcher at the Korean Ocean Research and Development Institute from 1998 to 2003, and as a professor and researcher at Seoul National University since 2003. As an associate professor in the School of Earth and Environmental Sciences, he specializes in Marine Geology and Geophysics. He heads the Undergraduate Interdisciplinary Program in Computational Sciences and the graduate program in Computational Science and Technology.

His research focuses on tectonic plates, underwater earthquakes, and volcanoes. He has advocated successfully at the national level for the use of Korean survey ships for basic scientific research.

After being injured in a car accident on July 2, 2006, Dr. Lee became a quadriplegic. He was able to return to work in less than a year, and continues to teach, do research, and travel. He has helped in the development of assistive technologies such as the DOWELL smartphone program by Samsung.

He is an advocate for the education of students with physical disabilities, and has introduced a "Calculative science collaboration major" focusing on the use of supercomputers, mathematics and digital modeling techniques, suitable for disabled science students. Lee served as Chair of the Preparation Committee of the "PyeongChang Forum for the Earth and its Citizens" prior to the 2018 Winter Olympics in PyeongChang.

== Education ==
- 1985, B.S., Seoul National University, College of Natural Sciences, Dept of Oceanography
- 1995, Ph.D., Massachusetts Institute of Technology/Woods Hole Oceanographic Institution, Joint Program in Oceanography/Applied Ocean Science and Engineering
- 1996–1998, Post-doctoral Research, Department of Geological Sciences, University of Durham, England

== Awards ==
- 2008 Commendation (Certificate of Honor), The Board of Supervisors of the City and County of San Francisco
- 2009 Medal of Merit, Republic of Korea
- 2010 2010 DO-IT Trailblazer Award, DO-IT Center, University of Washington
- 2011 Grand Prize, Seoul City Welfare Award

== Research Area ==
- Oceanography, Marine Geology and Geophysics, Geodynamics, Plate Tectonics, High-resolution Investigation of Deep Sea, Underwater Acoustics, Seafloor Topography, Underwater Volcanoes and Earthquakes, Gravity and Magnetics, Structure of Earth Interior, Numerical Modeling, Computational Sciences, Rock Magnetics, Assistive Technology

== Bibliography ==
- Lee, SM (2008) 0.1 Grams of Hope (0.1그램의 희망) Random House Korea. 341 pages. ISBN 9788925530284
- Lee, SM (1995). Tectonics of the East Pacific Rise: Studies of Faulting Characteristics and Magnetic and Gravity Anomalies. PhD Thesis. Woods Hole Mass: Mass. Inst. of Technol./ Woods Hole Oceanogr. Inst.
