= In-Young Ahn =

South Korean scientist

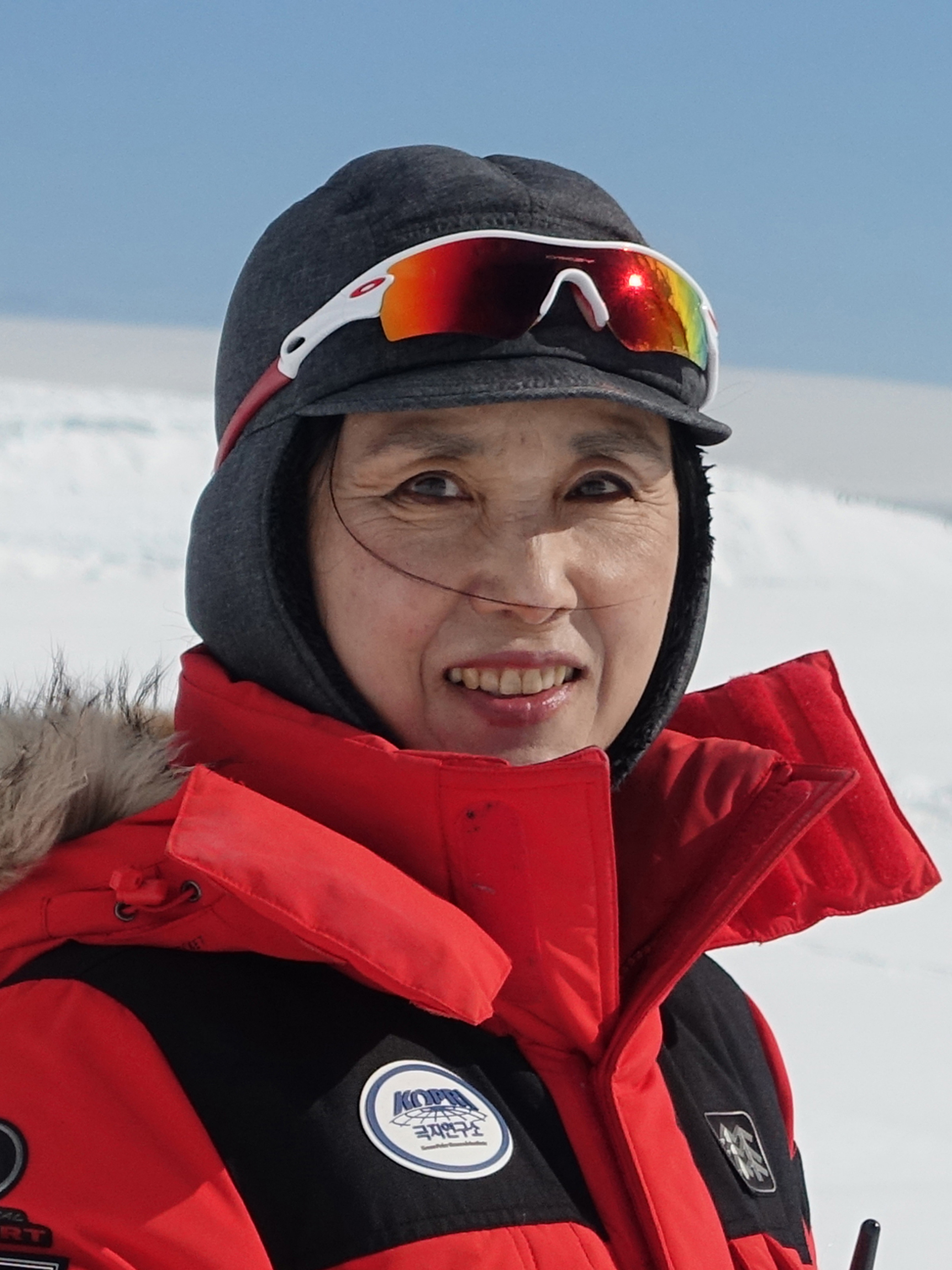
- Ahn at King Sejong Station, 2015
- Education: State University of New York at Stony Brook
- Known for: First South Korean woman to visit Antarctica; First female Antarctic station leader from Asia
- Scientific career
- Fields: Antarctic Marine Ecology
- Workplaces: South Korean Polar Research Institute (KOPRI)

Korean name
- Hangul: 안인영
- Hanja: 安仁英
- RR: An Inyeong
- MR: An Inyŏng
- Website: In-Young Ahn on ResearchGate

In-Young Ahn is a South Korean scientist. She is known for being the first South Korean woman to visit Antarctica and the first Asian woman to become an Antarctic station leader (King Sejong Station). She is a benthic ecologist and is currently working as a principal research scientist for the Korea Polar Research Institute.

== Early life and education ==
Ahn graduated from Seoul National University in 1982 (majoring in Biological Oceanography) and then received her PhD in Coastal Oceanography from the State University of New York at Stony Brook in 1990. Ahn started her research at the Korean Polar Research Institute (KOPRI) on July 1, 1991.

== Career and impact ==
Ahn was in charge of environmental monitoring program at the King Sejong Station from 1996 to 2011, and conducted field surveys to obtain scientific data necessary for designation of the Antarctic Specially Protected Area (ASPA #171) near the Korean station. Ahn has also served as a representative and a National Contact Point of the Committee for Environmental Protection (CEP) at the Antarctic Treaty Consultative Meetings from 1997 through 2014, until she was designated as the overwintering officer-in-charge. Ahn served as the vice president of the Korea Polar Research Institute (KOPRI) from May 2010 to June 2012. She also served as Vice President of the Korean Society of Oceanography in 2010–2011, and Korea Federation of Women's Science & Technology Associations in 2014 and 2015. She was expedition leader of the 28th overwintering team (2015) of the South Korean King Sejong Antarctic station, where she served as the station chief for about a year.

Ahn's research interests include Antarctic marine benthic ecology with special interests on benthic invertebrates and monitoring on Antarctic coastal marine ecosystems. She has studied the Antarctic clam Laternula elliptica, a dominant marine bivalve around Antarctic Continent. Ahn's current research includes studies on the impacts of glacier retreat on nearshore marine benthic communities around the King Sejong Station.

She is currently an adjunct professor at the University of Science & Technology (UST), and a principal research scientist at the Korean Polar Institute (KOPRI), which forms part of Korea Institute of Ocean Science & Technology (KIOST).

== Awards and honors ==
The South Korean government awarded Ahn a Medal of Science & Technology Merit for outstanding accomplishment in Antarctic Research in April 2001. She was further awarded a Commendation from the South Korean Ministry of Environment in June 2008 for her contribution in the designation of Antarctic Specially Protected Area (ASPA #171) near the King Sejong station. In 2016, she additionally received South Korea's Prime Minister's award in recognition of her achievement as the station leader at King Sejong station.

== Selected works ==
- Ahn, In-Young, et al. "First record of massive blooming of benthic diatoms and their association with megabenthic filter feeders on the shallow seafloor of an Antarctic fjord: Does glacier melting fuel the bloom?" Ocean Science Journal 51. 2 (2016): 273–279.
- HW Moon, WMRW Hussin, HC Kim, In-Young Ahn*. "The Impacts of climate change on Antarctic nearshore mega-epifaunal benthic assemblages in a glacial fjord on King George Island: Responses and implications." Ecological Indicators 57 (2015): 280–292.
- Ahn, In-Young, et al. "Influence of glacial runoff on baseline metal accumulation in the Antarctic limpet Nacella concinna from King George Island." Marine Pollution Bulletin 49 (2004): 119–141.
- Ahn, In-Young, et al. "Growth and seasonal energetics of the Antarctic bivalve Laternula elliptica from King George Island, Antarctica." Marine Ecology Progress Series 257(2003): 99–110.
- Ahn, In-Young, et al. "Baseline heavy metal concentrations in the Antarctic clam, Laternula elliptica in Maxwell Bay, King George Island, Antarctica." Marine Pollution Bulletin 32.8 (1996): 592–598.
- Ahn, In-Young. "Enhanced particle flux through the biodeposition by the Antarctic suspension-feeding bivalve Laternula elliptica in Marian Cove, King George Island." Journal of Experimental Marine Biology and Ecology 171.1 (1993): 75–90.

== See also ==
- Hong Kum Lee
