= Onnuri =

Onnuri may refer to:

- Onnuri Community Church, a South Korean megachurch
- RV Onnuri, a Korean research vessel built in Norway
