= Korea Institute of Ocean Science and Technology =

South Korean research organization

The Korea Institute of Ocean Science and Technology (KIOST) is a private oceanography research organization based in Busan. Formerly known as the Korean Ocean Research and Development Institute (KORDI), it started functioning under the name of the Korea Institute of Ocean Science and Technology from July 1, 2012, onwards.

== History ==
KIOST was founded on October 30, 1973, under the name Korean Ocean Research and Development Institute (KORDI). It was originally under the Korea Institute of Science and Technology (KIST).

On July 1, 2012, the Korea Institute of Ocean Science and Technology was officially established.

In 2014, the KIOST unveiled a six-legged robot that can walk the ocean floor. The robot is 2.4 x 2.4 x 1.3 meters in dimension. It weighs 650 kilos and contains 30 motors. In January 2017, after North Korea led nuclear tests at the Punggye-ri Nuclear Test Site, the KIOST published a study showing how radioactive materials from those tests probably traveled to the tip of Russia and Northern Japan. In July 2017, the KIOST partnered with the US National Oceanic and Atmospheric Administration to further the research of the Moored Array for African-Asian-Australian Monsoon Analysis and Prediction. In July 2018, when a South Korean company claimed to have found the wreck of a Russian warship (the Dmitrii Donskoi) that allegedly contained more than $130 billion in gold, the KIOST told the media it had known about the ship's location since 2003.

== Mission ==
The main functions of KIOST are:

1. To perform basic and applied research to promote the efficient use of coastal and ocean resources
2. To undertake comprehensive surveys and studies of Korea's seas and open oceans
3. To conduct scientific research in polar and tropical regions, especially in Antarctica and South Pacific
4. To develop technologies related to coastal, harbor, ship and ocean engineering as well as maritime safety.
5. To support and cooperate with other governmental agencies, universities and private companies towards the development of marine resources and the protection of the oceanic environment.
6. To coordinate and participate in international oceanographic research projects.

The KIOST also undertakes fundamental research in Antarctica. The main areas of interests are geological, geophysical and life sciencedalong with climate science. The institute owns the RV Onnuri, which is used to supply the year-round Antarctic station called the King Sejong Station (62.13'S; 58°45'W).

== Partnerships ==
KIOST has signed Memorandums of Understanding (MOUs) and bilateral agreements with national research institutes in China, Micronesia, United States, United Kingdom and Peru. Tertiary educational partners include the Norwegian University of Science and Technology, Rutgers University and the Virginia Institute of Marine Science at the University of Virginia in the United States. Partner organizations include Partnership for Observation of the Global Oceans and Partnerships in Environmental Management for the Seas of East Asia.
