= Sparta (ship) =

History

Russia
- Name: Sparta
- Owner: Antaeus
- Port of registry: Sovetskaya Gavan
- Launched: 10 January 1988

General characteristics
- Displacement: 876 tons
- Length: 48 m (157 ft 6 in)
- Beam: 8.8 m (28 ft 10 in)
- Height: 3.7 m (12 ft 2 in)
- Draught: 3.34 m (10 ft 11 in)
- Capacity: 286 tons
- Crew: 32

Sparta is a 48-metre (157 ft 6 in) Russian-flagged fishing trawler and refrigerator ship.

== Ross Sea incident ==
On 16 December 2011 Sparta sent out a distress signal after it struck a submerged iceberg while fishing for Antarctic cod in the Ross Sea. The incident left the vessel holed below the waterline and sinking close to the Ross Ice Shelf and approximately 2,000 nautical miles (3,700 km) south-east of New Zealand. The Royal New Zealand Air Force twice sent Hercules aircraft on seven-hour flights from Christchurch to air-drop equipment. (The planes had to refuel at McMurdo Station in Antarctica before returning to base.) The air-drops allowed the 32-man crew to pump out the flooded hold, make temporary repairs and stabilise the listing ship.

Pack ice meant nearby vessels, such as the Norwegian Seljevaer and Sparta's Russian sister ship Chiyo Maru 3, were unable to come to Sparta's aid. The crew of Sparta, made up of 16 Indonesians, 15 Russians and a Ukrainian researcher, had to wait until 26 December 2011 when the South Korean icebreaker Araon arrived. One of Araon's first tasks was to pump fuel into the raised side of Sparta, thus lifting the damaged hull and exposing it to the air. Sparta was stuck for 12 days before repairs could be made and it could head for safety in Port Nelson, New Zealand.

With the ship's fate in the balance, biologist David Ainley had criticised the system of fishing permits that allowed "underpowered, single-hulled boats" to operate in the area and the costs involved in rescuing them. Ecologist Alexei Knishkikov added his concern for local marine wildlife, should any of the Sparta's 200 tons of light fuel oil leak into the sea. In the event, only a little hydraulic oil spilled into the water.
