= Barton Peninsula =

Peninsula in the South Shetland Islands

- Interactive map of Barton Peninsula

Geography
- Location: King George Island, South Shetland Islands
- Coordinates: 62°13′36″S 58°44′29″W

Administration
- Administered under the Antarctic Treaty System

Demographics
- Population: Uninhabited

Barton Peninsula is a small peninsula separating Marian Cove and Potter Cove at the southwest end of King George Island, in the South Shetland Islands of Antarctica. It was named by the UK Antarctic Place-Names Committee in 1963 for Colin Barton, Falkland Islands Dependencies Survey geologist who worked in this part of King George Island, 1959–61.

South Korea's King Sejong Station is located here.
