= Korea Polar Research Institute =

- 극지연구소
- Formation: 2004

- Korea Polar Research Institute
- Hangul: 극지연구소
- Hanja: 極地硏究所
- RR: Geukji yeonguso
- MR: Kŭkchi yŏn'guso

Established in 2004, the Korea Polar Research Institute (KOPRI) is the lead agency for South Korea's national polar programme for the Arctic and the Antarctic and an advisor to the Government of South Korea. Its research projects have focused on biodiversity, climate change and geological evolution. The Institute participates in fora such as the Convention for the Conservation of Antarctic Marine Living Resources, the Council of Managers of National Antarctic Programs, the International Arctic Science Committee and the Scientific Committee on Antarctic Research (SCAR). KOPRI researchers and support staff operate on the icebreaker Araon, on campus at the Korea University of Science and Technology and in the country's three research stations — King Sejong and Jang Bogo in Antarctica, and Dasan at Ny-Ålesund, Svalbard. KOPRI sits within South Korea's Ministry of Oceans and Fisheries. Through international collaboration, KOPRI researches have undertaken studies in Alaska and Canada.
