= RV Onnuri =

History
- Name: Onnuri
- Owner: Korean Ocean Research and Development Institute
- Port of registry: South Korea
- Builder: Mjellem & Karlsen Verft AS, Skipsteknisk AS, Bergen, Norway
- Launched: 1991
- Completed: 1992
- Identification: Call sign: D9XJ; IMO number: 9011583; MMSI number: 440452000
- Status: Operational

General characteristics
- Type: Research Vessel
- Length: 63.8 m (209 ft)
- Beam: 12 m (39 ft)
- Decks: Two main engines (2 × 1,160 kW)
- Speed: 15.4 knots (28.5 km/h; 17.7 mph)
- Range: 10,000 nautical miles (19,000 km; 12,000 mi)
- Crew: 16 + 25 Scientists

RV Onnuri is one of the Korean Ocean Research and Development Institute (KORDI)'s research vessels. She was built in Bergen, Norway in 1991 by Mjellem & Karlsen Verft AS and designed by Skipsteknisk AS. She has been used to supply Korea's Antarctic research station (King Sejong Station) as well as undertaking oceanographic research in the Pacific Ocean. She has a sister ship, Eardo, also operated by KORDI.
