= 2026 in climate change =

This article documents notable events, research findings, scientific and technological advances, and human actions to measure, predict, mitigate, and adapt to the effects of global warming and climate change—during the year 2026.

== Measurements and statistics ==
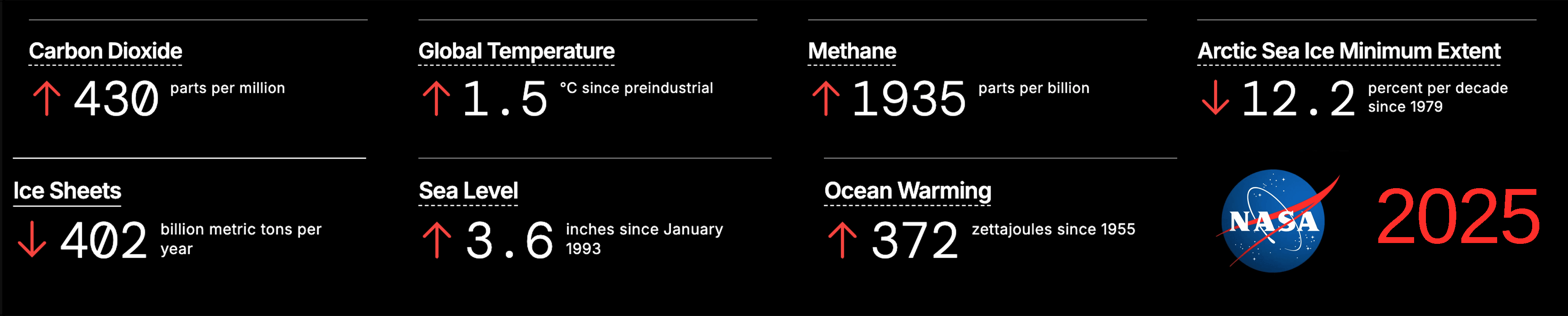
"Vital Signs of the Planet" as presented by NASA at the end of 2025 / beginning of 2026

Non-linear growth in the global warming effect of accumulating long-lived greenhouse gases contributed to economic damage over a 60-year period estimated to be over five times as large as that of a 30-year period (shown in chart). A Nature article estimated future damages from past emissions to be at least an order of magnitude larger than historical damages from the same emissions.

- 9 January: a report published in Advances in Atmospheric Sciences said that ocean heat content in 2025 had reached a new record for nine consecutive years.
- 9 January (reported): an Oxfam report concluded that the richest 1% exhausted their annual carbon budget in ten days. (Carbon budget is the amount of carbon dioxide that can be emitted while keeping the planet within 1.5 °C of global warming.)
- 22 January: Ember's European Electricity Review 2026 reported that in 2025, wind and solar energy provided 30% of EU electricity, surpassing fossil power (29%) for the first time, and generating more power than fossil sources in 14 of 27 EU countries.
- 4 February: a study published in npj Climate and Atmospheric Science estimated that a 1 °C (1.8 °F) increase in summer temperature causes up to three additional weeks of Alaskan glacier melt.
- 6 March: a study published in Geophysical Research Letters removed estimated influence of three natural variability factors and concluded with over 98% confidence that global warming from 2015 to 2025 accelerated more than during any previous decade.
- 6 March: a study published in Science Advances concluded that compound drought-heatwave events (CDHEs) have increased nearly eightfold since the early 2000s, from 1.6 to 13.1% per degree Celsius, with considerable regional variation.
- 10 March: a study published in Environmental Research: Health reported extensive statistics on present and projected worsening of heat- and humidity-related livability limitations.
- 25 March: a study published in Nature estimated that, from 1990 through 2020, carbon dioxide emissions in the US caused $10.2 trillion in cumulative damages by 2020, with about 30% occurring within the US itself. Damages from China were estimated at $8.7 trillion, and from the EU, $6.42 trillion. The researchers said that future damages from past emissions are at least an order of magnitude larger than historical damages from the same emissions.
- 17 April: based on climate-driven weakening of day-night weather constraints, a study published in Science Advances estimated that from 1975 to 2024, annual potential burning hours for wildfires in North America rose 36%.
- 21 April: Ember's Global Electricity Review 2026 said that, in 2025, clean power growth exceeded the rise in overall global electricity demand (fossil fuel generation declining), and that renewables overtook coal power.
- 12 May: a study published in Environmental Research Letters considered life-cycle emissions of electric vehicles (EVs) and internal combustion engine vehicles (ICEVs) and (acknowledging the variability of driving behaviors, climatic conditions, prices, fees, etc.) estimated that in the US battery electric vehicles (BEVs) save 40%–60% of emissions compared to ICEVs.
- 13 May: a study of "compound events" (example: droughts combined with extreme heat) published in Nature concluded that rare and severe events escalate disproportionately with increasing CO_{2} emissions. Accordingly, when compound events are considered, emission levels that are considered allowable are substantially lower than when conventional Earth system models are used.
- 13 May: a study published in Nature Health concluded that adoption in China of electric vehicles led to a reduction in airborne pollutants that prevented about 262,000 non-accidental deaths and 75,000 all-cause deaths.
- 15 May: a study published in Nature Sustainability analyzed how coal plants' aerosol pollution reduces energy photovoltaic (PV) energy production, including a 5.8% reduction in 2023, and losses from 2017 to 2023 equivalent to a third of energy added by new PV sources.
- 9 June: a study published in GeoHealth forecast that, under a low emissions scenario, 31.5K-231K US heat-related illnesses in 2012 would increase to 137K-314K by 2040. Under a high emissions scenario, the model predicted 42.5K-246K US illnesses in 2012 would increase to 156K-337K by 2040.
- 10 June:

— applying extreme event attribution, a study published in Nature Climate Change concluded that since 1900, the median frequency 1-in-100-year extreme coastal flooding events has increased ~12-fold, with human-driven radiative forcing alone quadrupling their likelihood.
— applying extreme event attribution, a study published in Science Advances concluded that human-caused climate change is responsible for ~58% of the daily extreme water level extremes over 2000–2018, and that human-caused sea level rise has caused a near-tripling of days with such extremes since the 1970s.

- 16 June: the United Nations Children’s Fund's Children’s Climate Risk Report 2026 estimated that almost all children are now exposed to at least one of the following climate hazards: riverine floods (337M, "M"=million), coastal floods (33M), droughts (1.8B, "B"=billion), tropical storms (662M), heatwaves (1.5B), extreme heat (1.2B), fires (206M), and sand/dust storms (123M).
- June: Energy Institute's 2026 Statistical Review of World Energy said that renewables (solar, wind, geothermal, biofuels; excluding hydro, nuclear) were the largest source of energy supply growth (+3.3 EJ; EJ=10^{18} joules) for the first time outside of a recession (outpacing oil (2.5 EJ), gas (2.4 EJ) and coal (1.1 EJ)).
- 28 July: risk assessor First Street's Global Severe Convective Storm Risk Pricing Economic Exposure to a Rising Peril stated that cumulative insured losses from severe convective storms (SCS)—hail, damaging straight-line winds, tornadoes, and severe thunderstorms—overtook that of tropical cyclones, with $82 billion in economic losses and constituting nearly one-third of all natural catastrophe losses worldwide in 2025.
- 26 August: a study published in Science Advances concluded that, based on current global temperature levels, on average, children (age 0–9) experience 9 to 10 more attributable heat stress days than people aged 60–69 years, and that this difference is likely conservative as children spend more time outdoors.
- 27 October: the 2026 Lancet "Countdown on health and climate change" stated, among other things, that from 2016 through 2023, an average of about 369,940 annual deaths (68.4% of the average 540,800 annual heat-associated deaths) were attributable to human-caused climate change; in 2023 alone, this figure was 507,650 (71.5%) of 710,000 heat-related deaths. Droughts were said to affect 51.8% of global land for at least a month in 2025.
- 9 November: a study of regional warming patterns published in Nature Climate Change estimated that by 2025, regional warming had reached about 90–94% of the levels expected at 1.5 °C global warming and 65–76% of those expected at 2 °C, concluding that "current warming is already indistinguishable from a 1.5 °C world".

== Natural events and phenomena ==
Heat storms—generally defined as heat waves of long duration and covering wide areas—have increased in recent decades, under one definition growing from five per year in the 1960s to 102 per year in the 2020s through September 2026. Spikes in heat waves have often followed within months after El Niño events.

- 4 February: a study published in Science Advances concluded that wildfire smoke fine particulate matter (PM_{2.5}) was responsible for ~24,100 all-cause deaths per year in the contiguous United States.
- 12 February: a study published in Nature Geoscience estimated that the contribution associated with a La Niña-to-El Niño transition explains about 75% of the 2022-2023 extreme increase in Earth's energy uptake, contributing to the record global surface temperatures and widespread climate extremes observed in 2023–2024.
- 25 February: a study published in Nature Ecology & Evolution stated that long-term global warming was associated with an annual fish biomass decline of up to 19.8% between 1993 and 2021 in major Northern Hemisphere basins.
- 25 February: a study published in PLOS One reported that between 1794 and 2024, there was an average absolute shift in flowering of tropical plants of 2.04 days per decade (range: 0.037–14.10), comparable to changes seen in temperate, boreal and alpine desert plants, and severe enough to cause interspecific misalignment between pollinators and seed dispersers.
- 26 February: a study published in Air Quality, Atmosphere & Health warned that increasing atmospheric carbon dioxide levels might cause human blood's bicarbonate, calcium and phosphorus levels to reach the limits of acceptable healthy range.
- 9 March: a study published in Atmospheric Science Letters estimated that, in the 3 May 2025 hailstorm in Western Europe, a 30% increase in probability of larger hail stones and a 2 cm (0.79 in) increase in hailstone size could be attributed to climate change.
- 10 March: a study published in the Journal of Geophysical Research considered continental-ocean mass redistribution due to melting of polar ice sheets and global glaciers and changes in Earth's hydrology, and said that 21st century climate change may be increasing the length of Earth's days at a rate among the highest in 3.6 million years.
- March: the World Meteorological Organization's State of the Global Climate 2025 introduced a new indicator of the Earth's energy balance and concluded that Earth's energy budget is more out of balance than at any previous time in the observational record.
- 25 March: a study published in Nature concluded that extreme global climate outcomes may occur even under moderate (2 °C) global warming.
- 26 March: a study published in Nature Communications concluded that environmental heat stress thresholds may be cooler and drier than previously thought, more specifically, that "non-survivable conditions" are occurring during present-day heat events that are below the six-hour 35 °C wet-bulb temperature threshold that currently defines such conditions.
- 8 April: a study published in Science Advances concluded that over the past 20 years, the Atlantic meridional overturning circulation (AMOC) has weakened at four different latitudes along the western boundary of the North Atlantic Ocean, that boundary thought to constitute the "canary in a coal mine" for the tendency of the AMOC as a whole.
- 10 April: NOAA's "Final La Niña Advisory" concluded that La Niña conditions had transitioned to ENSO-neutral, which was expected to persist through Northern Hemisphere summer.
- 15 April: a study published in Science Advances estimated a slowdown of the Atlantic meridional overturning circulation (AMOC) of 51±8%—a weakening ~60% stronger than suggested by multimodel mean estimates.
- 16 April (reported): an editorial published in Nature noted that, in 2025, mosquitos were found in Iceland for the first time, and were said to be "a warning that the Arctic lacks a system for monitoring arthropods and anticipating biological risks before they escalate".
- 4 May: a study published in Nature Climate Change estimated that airborne microplastics and nanoplastics add direct radiative forcing of ~1.34 W/m^{2}, exceeding that of black carbon by a factor of 4.7.
- 6 May: a study published in Science concluded that, on 10 August 2025, climate change had "preconditioned" a >64 million cubic meter landslide in Alaska's Tracy Arm fjord that caused a 481-meter run-up megatsunami after an initial 100-meter high breaking wave traveling at over 70 metres per second (160 mph).
- 8 May: a study published in the Proceedings of the National Academy of Sciences concluded that, even under gradual environmental change, eco-evolutionary feedback can create a tipping point beyond which adaptation fails, as genetic drift overwhelms selection and species' ranges contract from the margins or fragment abruptly.
- 8 May: a study published in Science Advances applied a sea ice-ocean model identifying three distinct phases of Antarctic sea ice retreat, and suggested that "persistent upwelling-favorable conditions under anthropogenic forcing may push the Southern Ocean into a prolonged low sea ice state".
- 11 May: a study published in Nature Geoscience concluded that stratospheric cooling atop a warming troposphere is the result of the spectroscopy of carbon dioxide and not a result of increasing optical thickness.
- 19 May: a study published in Nature Climate Change concluded that warm-blooded seabirds—unable to adjust their body temperature to ambient temperature—must reduce their geographic range in response to global warming, forcing them to disperse over longer distances.
- 20 May: a study published in Science Advances estimated that the factors driving sea level rise since 1960 are 43% from thermal ocean expansion, 27% from glacier melting, 15% from Greenland, 12% from Antarctica, and 3% from land water storage.
- 28 May: a study published in Geophysical Research Letters concluded that the cooling observed in the "cold blob" south of Greenland and Iceland is due to changes in the Atlantic meridional overturning circulation (ocean heat transport), and not because of variations in ocean surface heat loss.
- 28 May: a study published in Communications Earth & Environment suggested that an Arctic Ocean regime shift is occurring because of nitrate reductions attributable to Arctic sea ice decline.
- 11 June: a National Oceanic and Atmospheric Administration notice stated that "El Niño conditions are present and expected to strengthen into the Northern Hemisphere winter 2026-27".
- 12 June: a study published in Science Advances concluded that coupling between photosynthesis and woody biomass growth (wood acting as a carbon sink) has been overestimated, so that current earth system models may be overestimating long-term carbon sequestration in forests.
- 12 June: considering "deep carbon"— at least 3 metres (9.8 ft) deep—in permafrost thaw, a study published in Science Advances concluded that in high-emission scenarios, northern soil carbon balance's reversal from carbon sink to carbon source should be advanced from what is predicted by existing Earth system models.
- 17 June: a study of UK floods and droughts published in Earth's Future (American Geophysical Union) concluded that increased global warming will increase "hydrodynamic whiplash" (sudden shifts between wet and dry conditions), which might cause a drought to make land less able to subsequently absorb intense rain.
- 20 July: a study published in the Proceedings of the National Academy of Sciences said that exceptionally low 2025 and 2026 arctic ice extent indicated that 20-year arctic sea ice decline was "becoming significant again" after a period in which such declines had been insignificant.
- 27 July: a study published in the Proceedings of the National Academy of Sciences concluded that, above a certain air temperature threshold, the date of lake ice spring melting advances non-linearly, with the sensitivity of ice loss increasing up to 22-fold.
- 5 August: a study published in Nature Ecology & Evolution concluded that 80% of butterfly species studied experienced range expansions and 27% experienced range contractions; 79% of range shifts were associated with climate change and extreme weather events.
- 5 August: a study published in Science Advances concluded that, since the 1850s in the western US, "snow-eater heat waves"—involving abrupt snowmelt triggered by rain-on-snow events, and possibly causing flooding, initiating or accelerating snow drought, and affecting water availability—have increased in area and frequency, decreased in duration, and shifted earlier in the melt season.
- 12 August: a study published in Trends in Ecology & Evolution concluded that, contrary to current assumptions, water scarcity and droughts can intensify many diseases by "altering host aggregation, parasite persistence, community composition, and contact networks across space and time".
- 27 August: a study published in Science reported that geochemistry of Galápagos coral skeletons across the past millennium shows a large recent increase in interannual variability of sea surface temperature in the eastern equatorial Pacific compared to existing paleorecords, an increase that exceeds simulated natural variability and that results from stronger El Niño–Southern Oscillation (ENSO) events.
- 10 September: a study published in AGU Advances concluded that since 1980, extreme dry and humid heat seasons have significantly expanded over 50% and 48% of the global land area, respectfully, and that the expansions are primarily asymmetric (occurring before vs after the historical extreme heat season, in different regions of the world).
- 14 September: Antarctic sea ice reaches an annual winter maximum extent of about 17.59 million square kilometres (6.79 million sq mi), the third-lowest peak in the satellite record.
- 16 September: a study published in Scientific Data concluded that the Greenland and Antarctic ice sheets lost 11,309 ±565 billion tonnes of ice between 1979 and 2023, with glacier dynamical imbalance driving 84% of the ice loss and surface mass balance the remainder.
- 21 September: the Potsdam Institute for Climate Impact Research's Planetary Health Check 2026 reported that seven out of nine planetary boundaries have been transgressed.
- 14 October: The 2026 state of the climate report published in BioScience stated that seven of sixteen climate-related indicators are currently at record extremes, and that progress in mitigation climate change "remains far below the scale and speed needed to stabilize Earth’s climate system".
- 23 October: a study published by Imperial College London estimated 50,391 heat-related excess deaths across 854 European cities during the summer heat waves, with around two thirds attributable to anthropogenic climate change.
- 28 October: a study published in Nature Climate Change reported an abrupt reversal since 2016 of the previous trend in densification and salinfication of the Antarctic Intermediate Water (AAIW)—a key component of the global overturning circulation—signaling "a hemispheric-scale reconfiguration of the pycnocline".

== Actions, and goal statements ==
=== Science and technology ===
- January (reported): a Chinese company launched the first megawatt-level airborne wind turbine—a 60x40x40 m (197x131x131 ft) helium-filled aerostat—providing electricity through a tether cable from 2,000 metres (6,600 ft) above the ground.
- 14 January: at Concordia Station, Antarctica, the Ice Memory Foundation inaugurated a global repository of mountain ice cores, to ensure that future generations will be able to study past climate conditions.
- 15 January: a study published in Nature Climate Change estimated the 2020 ocean-based social cost of carbon (SCC) to be almost double that of prior SCC estimates that didn't consider ocean-related impacts.
- 12 February: anomalous increases in tropical sea surface temperatures have caused NOAA to revise the threshold distinguishing La Niña and El Niño (ENSO) events from each other. The new method replaces a dependency on a 30-year climate base period with the Relative Oceanic Niño Index (RONI): a comparison of the ENSO region to the global tropics.
- 4 March: a study published in Nature concluded that sea level measurements that have been based on geoid models rather than actual sea level measurements have underestimated the degree of sea level rise.
- 24 April: a study published in Science Advances concluded that artificial closure of the Bering Strait can extend the safe carbon budget of the Atlantic meridional overturning circulation (AMOC), provided that the AMOC is strong enough at the time of closure.

=== Political, economic, legal, and cultural actions ===
Threat to global stability and prosperity

Let's tell it like it is: The world's addiction to fossil fuels is one of the greatest threats to global stability and prosperity. Three fourths of humanity lives in countries that are net importers of fossil fuels; dependent on energy they do not control at prices they cannot predict; watching development budgets siphoned into fuel bills; at the constant mercy of geopolitical turmoil and supply disruptions.

— UN Secretary General António Guterres
18 January 2026
'Suicidal' model of capitalism

There is inertia in the power and the economy of this archaic form of energy—fossil fuels—that lead to death. Undoubtedly, that form of capital can commit suicide, taking with it humanity and [other] life. The question that needs to be asked is whether capitalism can truly adapt to a non-fossil energy model.

— Gustavo Petro, President of Colombia, in late April 2026
International Conference on
Transitioning Away from Fossil Fuels
Limiting Overshoot

While the international community has made progress on climate change, global action to cut greenhouse gas emissions has not been fast enough to avoid global warming crossing 1.5 °C above pre-industrial levels in the next few years.

— United Nations Environment Programme
August 2026
- 7 January: US President Donald Trump announced that the United States would be withdrawing from the 1992 United Nations Framework Convention on Climate Change (UNFCC), the UN's Intergovernmental Panel on Climate Change (IPCC), and 65 other international organizations—alleging the treaties "no longer serve American interests". The UNFCC was unanimously ratified by the U.S. Senate in 1992 and signed by then President George H. W. Bush.
- 7 January: US President Donald Trump's Office of Management and Budget received a proposed final rule reversing the 2009 Endangerment Finding, which stated that greenhouse gases endanger public health and welfare by driving climate change. The Endangerment Finding had enabled federal government regulation of greenhouse gas emissions.
- 8 January: US President Donald Trump's administration announced that the country would be withdrawing from the Green Climate Fund, which since 2010 has provided funds to help poorer nations deal with the effects of climate change.
- 27 January: the United States completed its second formal withdrawal from the 2015 Paris Agreement—one year after US President Donald Trump signed an executive order to begin the withdrawal process. This second withdrawal reversed Trump's predecessor Joe Biden's re-entry into the agreement after Trump's 2017 first withdrawal.
- 28 January: The Hague District Court ruled that the Dutch government had discriminated against the inhabitants of the Caribbean island of Bonaire, by not taking timely and appropriate measures to protect them against the consequences of climate change. The court ordered the Dutch government to set legally binding targets to reduce greenhouse gas emissions in line with the Paris Agreement, as well as making a climate adaptation plan for Bonaire.
- 30 January: a US federal judge ruled that the Trump administration's Department of Energy violated the law with its "Climate Working Group" of five handpicked climate change skeptics who reject the scientific consensus on climate change. The group's July 2025 A Critical Review of Impacts of Greenhouse Gas Emissions on the U.S. Climate supported the administration's attack on the 2009 Endangerment Finding that underpins the US federal government's legal authority to combat climate change.
- 6 February: the US Federal Judicial Center informed Republican attorneys general that the climate science chapter from the Reference Manual on Scientific Evidence—relied on by federal judges in complex cases involving science—had been removed, per the AGs' urging eight days earlier.
- 12 February: the US Environmental Protection Agency formally rescinded the Endangerment Finding, which had enabled US federal government regulation of greenhouse gas emissions. On 19 March, 24 states filed a Petition for review of the EPA's action.
- 27 April: US President Donald Trump fired all 22 members of the National Science Board, which was established in 1950 to guide the National Science Foundation and to advise the president and Congress on policies about science and engineering.
- 13 May: the United Nations General Assembly stated that it "welcomes the unanimous advisory opinion of the International Court of Justice of 23 July 2025 on the obligations of States in respect of climate change".
- 15 May: a study published in Nature Human Behaviour analyzed the relation of climate change and social health, including how social health is both a climate vulnerability and a lever for climate action.
- 17 May: the Pan-European Commission on Climate and Health formally urged the World Health Organization to declare the climate crisis a public health emergency of international concern.
- 22 May: a study published in Nature Climate Change concluded that reducing the data produced by the Global Ocean Observing System would substantially degrade its ability to monitor ocean heat content changes. Separately, as reported on 1 June, the US Trump administration announced dismantlement of the Ocean Observatories Initiative that includes 900 deep-sea instruments, that since 2016 has been monitoring coastal environments, marine ecosystems and currents such as the Atlantic meridional overturning circulation, a move that was paused on 18 June pending further study. On 3 June, the president of the European Commission announced investment of €92 million ($107 million) in project OceanEye for monitoring the oceans.
Early Warnings

Throughout the 1950s and 1960s, top scientists concluded that global climate change was likely to occur, that burning fossil fuels was the primary cause, and that these climatic changes risked causing severe harms.

— Center for International Environmental Law
15 July 2026
- 8–18 June: a UN climate conference takes place in Bonn, Germany. Carbon Brief summarized the outcome as having produced "few tangible outcomes as diplomats faced gridlock".
- 18 June (reported): US President Trump's administration agreed to pay companies billions of taxpayer dollars to abandon wind farm projects in favor of fossil fuel development.
- 23 June: a new privately operated website, climate.us, was activated to preserve science content from the US government's climate.gov website, operated by NOAA, which was "shuttered" by the Trump administration in June 2025.
- 20 July: the Center for Climate Integrity's The Fraud of "Clean" Natural Gas laid out how the natural gas industry ignored 1960s warnings re respiratory problems and methane as a greenhouse gas, and in the 1970s crafted a campaign to sell natural gas as a "clean" fuel.
- 22 November: the United Nations said that the 2026 United Nations Climate Change Conference (COP31, in Antalya, Turkey) "collapsed" after two days of "overtime" negotiations. In the longest-running UN climate summit on record, negotiators did not work out a climate pact because of divisions over language relating to fossil fuels.

=== Mitigation goal statements ===
- 7 April: Global Energy Outlook 2026: How the World Lost the Goal of 1.5°C, published by Resources for the Future, concluded that achieving the 2015 Paris Agreement's goal of limiting temperature rise to 1.5 °C is no longer plausible, and that limiting the rise to 2 °C will be "extremely challenging" and "requires additional policy effort".
- 2 June: the government of Great Britain set a target to cut emissions ‌by about 87% by 2040 from 1990 levels, the Climate Change Committee recommending more renewable energy and less meat consumption.
- 24 September: the German Federal Ministry for the Environment, Nature Conservation, Nuclear Safety and Consumer Protection wrote that while the country has already cut emissions by 48% of the 1990 level, the Federal Climate Action Act requires net greenhouse gas neutrality no later than 2045.
- 21 October: the Emissions Gap Report 2026 said that, to minimize peak warming and return to 1.5 °C by 2100, to achieve a 'lowest possible' 1.5 °C overshoot scenario in which peak warming is limited to 1.7–1.8 °C by mid-century, greenhouse gas emissions would have to be cut by 18% by 2030, 45% by 2035 and 69% by 2040, all relative to 2025 levels.

=== Adaptation goal statements ===
- 10 June (reported): the Global Environment Facility (GEF) approved an initial $3.9bn (€3.4bn) package to support climate change adaptation, biodiversity protection, and water security over the next four years.

== Consensus ==
- 8 January: a summary of surveys of 70,337 participants in 17 countries, published in Nature Sustainability, reported that, for both extreme weather-related hazards and general climate change-related risks, survey participants perceived their own personal risks were lower than other people's risks.

== Projections ==
Failure to return to 1.5 °C threshold

Many impacts from cryosphere loss will be irreversible on human timescales even if global temperatures are returned to 1.5 °C, especially if thresholds and tipping points are crossed. These include sea-level rise from the melting of ice sheets and glaciers, water security challenges from glacier and snow loss, greenhouse gas emissions from permafrost thaw, polar ocean warming, acidification, ocean circulation disruption, and ecosystem and biodiversity loss.

— International Cryosphere Climate Initiative
2 November 2026
- 28 January: a study published in Nature forecast that climate change could lead to 123 million additional malaria cases and 532,000 additional deaths in Africa between 2024 and 2050 under current malaria control levels. Extreme weather events are thought to cause 79% of additional cases and 93% of additional deaths.
- 7 April: a study published in Geoscientific Model Development concluded that emissions associated with RCP8.5—the most extreme future emissions scenario—"have become implausible, based on trends in the costs of renewables, the emergence of climate policy and recent emission trends".
- 6 May: a study published in Nature projected that global warming of 1.5–1.9 °C (2.7–3.4 °F) and deforestation of 22–28% would cause 62−77% of the Amazon rainforest to transition to grassland.
- 7 May: a study described in Science forecast that 7-16% of 60,000 plant species will be at high extinction risk by 2100. Another 7 May Science article published similar findings.
- 27 May: a study published in Nature forecast a 36.5–42.1% increase in global hailstorm-induced damage potential by 2100, with the magnitude determined by the emission scenario.
- 28 May: the World Meteorological Organization forecast that the average global surface temperature for each year from 2026 through 2030 will be between 1.3–1.9 °C (2.3–3.4 °F) higher than the pre-industrial baseline, and that there is a 75% chance that the five-year average will be more than 1.5 °C (2.7 °F) above baseline.
- 10 September: a study published in Environmental Research Letters estimated that warming-induced emissions (WIE) of greenhouse gases from natural sources (permafrost, wetlands, freshwaters, wildfire)—which are not represented by most current climate models—could add 0.2 °C–0.4 °C of global warming by 2100.
- 30 September: a study published in Nature Geoscience that constrained ice-sheet model projections with satellite observations concluded that the Antarctic ice sheet is very likely (≥92% probability) to lose mass overall by 2100 even under aggressive emissions-reduction scenarios, and that higher emissions very likely increase this loss.
- 12 October: a study published in Nature Communications estimated that the global mean sea level could rise 30±6 millimeters (1.18±0.24 inches) by 2100 due to melting of Thwaites Glacier, approximately doubling prior projections even if no further climate warming takes place.

== Significant publications ==
- "Global Water Bankruptcy / Living Beyond Our Hydrological Means in the Post-Crisis Era" (PDF). United Nations University Institute for Water, Environment and Health. 20 January 2026.
- "State of the Global Climate 2025". World Meteorological Organization (WMO). March 2026.
- "Food security to crumble in face of climate change". 23 March 2026. Archived from the original on 24 March 2026. (Food Security Index ratings for 162 countries under different degrees of global warming)
- Raimi, Daniel; Joiner, Emily; Hubbell, Bryan; Lohawala, Nafisa; Robertson, Molly (7 April 2026). "Global Energy Outlook 2026: How the World Lost the Goal of 1.5°C" (PDF). Resources for the Future. Archived (PDF) from the original on 7 April 2026.
- "European State of the Climate / Report 2025". World Meteorological Organization (WMO). April 2026.
- 24/7 Renewables - The Economics of Firm Solar and Wind (PDF). International Renewable Energy Agency (IRENA). May 2026. ISBN 978-92-9260-736-4. Archived (PDF) from the original on 7 May 2026.
- "World Energy Investment 2026" (PDF). International Energy Agency (IEA). 28 May 2026. Archived (PDF) from the original on 28 May 2026.
- Edwards, M. R., Geden, O., Gidden, M. J., Lamb, W. F., Minx, J. C., Nemet, G. F., Smith, S. M., Bellamy, R., Brutschin, E., Diaz Anadon, L., Fuss, S., Grassi, G., Johnstone, I., Lebling, K., Lunstrum, A., Müller-Hansen, F., Portugal-Pereira, J., Probst, B., Vaughan, N. E. (eds.) Singleton, Sarah; Edwards, Morgan (2 June 2026). "The State of Carbon Dioxide Removal / A global, independent scientific assessment of Carbon Dioxide Removal / 3rd Edition" (PDF). doi:10.17605/OSF.IO/ZRD65. Archived (PDF) from the original on 2 June 2026.
- "The Third World Ocean Assessment / 1. Overall summary". United Nations. 8 June 2026. Archived from the original on 9 June 2026. (full pdf said to be forthcoming)
- Forster, Piers M.; et al. (11 June 2026). "Indicators of Global Climate Change 2025: annual update of key indicators of the state of the climate system and human influence". Earth System Science Data. 18 (6): 3889–3933. Bibcode:2026ESSD...18.3889F. doi:10.5194/essd-18-3889-2026. Archived from the original on 12 June 2026.
- "Children's Climate Risk Report 2026" (PDF). UNICEF.org. United Nations Children’s Fund (UNICEF). June 2026. Archived (PDF) from the original on 18 June 2026.
- "2026 Statistical Review of World Energy" (PDF). Energy Institute. June 2026. Archived (PDF) from the original on 30 June 2026.
- Modirzadeh SA, Davies E, Fitzpatrick M, Sinclair M, Jahn V and Dietz S. "Transition Planning 2026: Decarbonisation strategies in oil and gas, and diversified mining" (PDF). TPI Global Climate Transition Centre, part of the Global School of Sustainability at the London School of Economics and Political Science. June 2026.
- "Early Warnings: Government Knowledge of Climate Change and Legal Responsibility for Climate Harm" (PDF). Center for International Environmental Law. 15 July 2026. Archived (PDF) from the original on 16 July 2026.
- "Levelized Cost of Energy +" (PDF). Lazard. 13 July 2026. Archived (PDF) from the original on 14 July 2026.
- "Attribution of Extreme Weather and Climate Events and Their Impacts". National Academies of Sciences, Engineering, and Medicine. July 2026. Archived from the original on 17 July 2026.
- Limiting Overshoot: Navigating exceedence of 1.5 °C pathways and pathways toward return. United Nations Environment Programme. August 2026. doi:10.59117/20.500.11822/49857. ISBN 978-92-807-4301-2. Archived from the original on 3 September 2026. (The main link leads directly to an archived 139-page PDF. "The original" link connects to the live page that has a download link.)
- Caesar, Levke; Sakschewski, Boris; et al. (September 2026). Kitzmann, Niklas Henrik; Sakschewski, Boris; Caesar, Levke; Rockström, Johan (eds.). "Planetary Health Check 2026 / A Scientific Assessment of the State of Our Planet". Potsdam Institute for Climate Impact Research. doi:10.48485/pik.2026.25. Archived from the original on 21 September 2026. (planetary boundaries)
- Kenney, Melissa A. et al. Kenney, Melissa A.; et al. (22 September 2026). "Research Priorities for Robust Climate Assessments in the United States". Bulletin of the American Meteorological Society. 107 (9): E2152–E2220. Bibcode:2026BAMS..107E2152K. doi:10.1175/BAMS-D-26-0305.1. (authored by many who were removed from service for the US National Climate Assessments by the Trump administration)
- "UN Declaration on Sea Level Rise" (PDF). United Nations. 22 September 2026. Archived (PDF) from the original on 24 September 2026.
- Ripple, William J.; Wolf, Christopher; Mann, Michael E.; Rockstrom, Johan; et al. (14 October 2026). "The 2026 state of the climate report: challenges and opportunities". BioScience biag125. doi:10.1093/biosci/biag125.
- Kuramochi, Takeshi; den Elzen, Michel; Vishwanathan, Saritha Sudharmma (21 October 2026). "Emissions Gap Report 2026 / The point of return / Urgent emissions cuts needed to come back from overshoot of 1.5 °C". United Nations Environment Programme (UNEP). Archived from the original on 21 October 2026.
- Romanello, Marina; et al. (27 October 2026). "The 2026 report of the Lancet Countdown on health and climate change: a decade of escalating health harms and a decisive moment for all". The Lancet. doi:10.1016/S0140-6736(26)01779-4. Section: "Accelerating health threats in a heating world".
- Kirkham, J. D.; Pearson, P.; Garbe, J.; Hancock, S.; Imdieke, A. (2 November 2026). "Overshoot and the Cryosphere: Averting Global Meltdown / The Implications of Temperature Overshoot, Peak and Decline for the Cryosphere". International Cryosphere Climate Initiative. doi:10.5281/zenodo.23477467.

== See also ==
- 2026 in science
- 2026 in Antarctica
- Weather of 2026
- Climatology § History
- History of climate change policy and politics
- History of climate change science
- Politics of climate change § History
- Timeline of sustainable energy research 2020–present
