= Our Ocean Conference =

Intergovernmental climate, fishing, and oceans forum

- Formation: 2014
- Founded at: Washington, D.C.
- Type: Intergovernmental organization

The Our Ocean Conference (OOC) is an annual international conference and organization established in 2014 by then-United States Secretary of State John Kerry. The conference aims to bring together business, world leaders, governments, scientists, and non-governmental organizations to protect the world's oceans.

== Background ==
Headed by the United States Secretary of State John Kerry and the Barack Obama administration, the first Our Ocean Conference was held in Washington, D.C. in 2014. Since then, annual conferences have been held in Canada, South Korea, and Chile. The conference has developed into a major global summit to protect marine environments and find funding for developed solutions. Main objectives of the annual meetings include combatting marine pollution, expanding marine protected areas, combatting climate change, building sustainable fisheries and a blue economy, and maritime security. OOC claims to have secured $169 billion in pledged monetary commitments and 2,900 overall global commitments. Its secretariat is hosted by the Ocean Program at the World Resources Institute. In September 2026, Canadian federal fisheries minister Joanne Thompson appointed Diana Fox Carney, the spouse of Prime Minister Mark Carney, as Canada's first ocean envoy ahead of the 12th Our Ocean Conference, which will be held in Halifax, Nova Scotia. Fox Carney will also chair the event; the position is unpaid.

=== Conferences ===
No.	Date	Host country	Host city
1st	16–17 June 2014	United States	Washington, D.C.
2nd	5–6 October 2015	Chile	Valparaíso
3rd	15–16 September 2016	United States	Washington, D.C.
4th	5–6 October 2017	Malta	Valletta
5th	29–30 October 2018	Indonesia	Bali
6th	23–24 October 2019	Norway	Oslo
7th	13–14 April 2022	Palau	Koror
8th	2–3 March 2023	Panama	Panama City
9th	16–17 April 2024	Greece	Athens
10th	28–30 April 2025	South Korea	Busan
11th	16–18 June 2026	Kenya	Mombasa
12th	9–11 May 2027	Canada	Halifax
13th		Jamaica	Montego Bay
