= United Nations Water Conference =

The United Nations Water Conference took place on March 14, 1977 in Mar Del Plata, Argentina. The conference was addressed by de facto President Jorge Rafael Videla.

== Common problems in water scarce countries ==
The amount of water available to an area is dependent on its climate and position in the global water cycle. Dominance of water-rich temperate countries has overlooked the fact that water is a finite resource. High water stress is a serious problem growing season is short and recurrent droughts make irrigation necessary for food supply to be attained. The increasing threat of famine and drought in Africa is cause for global concern.

Major water problems occur in temperate zones due to ignorance or neglect. For example, water pollution has surpassed itself as a regional issue to a global issue. In tropical and sub-tropical climates, they face different problems. The tropical climate makes countries more vulnerable to floods, droughts, and land degradation (desertification). In other climates, such as humid, wet climates in Southeast Asia, supply large amounts of water into the ground. Human practices like irrigation have taken important nutrients from the soil and deplete the nature around it. Climate issues in different climates are much more far reaching to be more of a global concern.

== United Nations Water Conference ==
The United Nations Water Conference was the first intergovernmental meeting on problems ensuring adequate water supply for the future. Delegates from 105 countries, as well as intergovernmental and non-governmental organizations, were also present. Its purpose was to avoid a water crisis at the end of the century. There was need for extensive improvements in food and crop yields.

A set of ten resolutions were made directed at United Nations agencies, governments, and the international community overall. These ten resolutions including: (i) assessment of water resources, (ii) community water supply, (iii) agricultural water use, (iv) research and development of industrial technologies, (v) the role of water in combating desertification, (vi) technical co-operation among developing countries, (vii) river commissions in international river basins, (viii) institutional arrangements for international co-operation in the water sector, (ix) financing arrangements for international co-operation in the water sector, and (x) water policies in the occupied territories.

=== Action Plan ===
At the United Nations Water Conference in 1977, the first Action Plan was created recognizing that, “all peoples, whatever their stage of development and social and economic conditions, have the right to have access to drinking water in quantities and of a quality equal to their basic needs.”

==== January 1992: International Conference on Water and Sustainable Development - Dublin. ====
Principal 4 of the Dublin Conference stated that, “it is vital to recognize the basic right of all human beings to have access to clean water and sanitation at an affordable price.”

==== June 1992: United Nations Conference on Environment and Development - Rio ====
Chapter 18 or Agenda 21 endorsed the resolution from the Mar del Plata Water Conference of 1977 saying that it was “the commonly agreed premise.”

==== September 1994: United Nations International Conference on Population and Development ====
The Programme of Action from the UN International Conference on Population and Development confirms that all individuals, “have the right to an adequate standard of living for themselves and their families, including adequate food, clothing, housing, water, and sanitation.”

==== November 2002: General Comment No. 15. The Right to Water ====
General Comment 15 of the 1966 International Covenant on Economic, Social, and Cultural rights (ICESCR) confirmed the right to water in international law. Within that the is, Article 11 allows for the right to an adequate standard of living, and Article 12 the right to the highest attainable standard of health.

Article I.1 states that “the human right to water is indispensable for leading a life of human dignity. It is a prerequisite for the realization of other human rights.”

==== July 2005: Draft Guidelines for the Realization of the Right to Drinking Water and Sanitation. ====
These draft guidelines were intended to assist government policymakers, international agencies and members of civil society working in the water and sanitation sector to implement the right to drinking water and sanitation. These guidelines do not legally define the right to water and sanitation, but provide a guide for its implementation.

==== July 2010: UN General Assembly Resolution ====
UN Resolution formally recognizes the right to water and sanitation and acknowledges they are essential for human rights. The Resolution calls upon States and international organizations to provide financial resources and technology, especially to developing countries, to provide safe, clean, accessible, and affordable drinking water and sanitation for all Water is a human right for everyone to have.

==== Effectiveness of the Action Plan ====
For most UN conferences, there is a follow-up conference ten years later. While there was the Water Conference which main focus was the “Improved Efficiency in the Management of Water Resources” in 1987. They spoke on improving the use of financial, technological, and human resources. This small, inter-regional was not done on a bigger scale due to the lack of single UN-body in charge of implementing the Action Plan made at Mar del Plata. Many groups have complained that "many problems are still in need of suitable action." Finally, thirteen years later the UN began implementing the Mar del Plata Action Plan in the 1990s. An assessment was done for the different economic regions in need of water where programs were required. Many programs they created were ignored until the 2000s, like serving every man, woman, and child with acceptable drinking water.

There were many reasons the Action Plan was not successful. One such reason was the broadness with which it was written. For example, rather than referring to different countries who have different climates, they just referred to them as “countries.” On the country level, governments had to make tough economic decisions, prioritizing the most urgent problems. When the UN body allowed steering councils to make decisions on where to fix issues, they based their decisions on their budget plans. Finally, there was no timeline created on when these issues were going to be solved and the drought and famine problems have only gotten worse since 1977.

== Today ==
The Zaragoza Conference was held in 2012 in Rio de Janeiro was focused on “The Future We Want.” They talked about sustainability of natural resources, and the development of business, civil society, and governments".

=== Water Quality ===
WASH has widened the ambition of the water agenda to include water waste management and protecting ecosystem. Use of water is growing at twice the rate of population growth and ways to manage wastewater, treatment, and reuse. Wastewater can be collected, treated, and recycled to some extent.

=== Water Challenges ===
Today has expanded beyond water and sanitation to include hygiene, household, and beyond the household: Water, Sanitation, and Hygiene (WASH). It also addresses concern with safety, equality, and sustainability. Advances made have unequally distributed in many countries, especially Sub-Saharan Africa.

WASH created the new 2015 objectives:

1. No open defecation
2. Basic access to drinking water, sanitation, and hygiene for households, schools and health facilities.
3. Increase the population without home access to safely drinking water and sanitation services.
4. Elimination of inequalities by population groups as to allow more access to services.

=== Implementation Challenges ===
Forty-six countries still have more than 50% of their population without improved sanitation and there are at least 800 million people still drinking water contaminated with feces. Disparities of water are at the base of all inequalities in poor countries. The Sustainable Development Goal for Water is in the range of the resources, the human and social capacities and the technologies available. These challenges can be combatted by increasing finance to allow benefits to come up in front while also improving the use of financial resources already available. The use of low-cost science and technology that will increase efficiency in water provision and use in industry, agriculture, and energy production. These technologies must be adaptable to the scale and capacity of local conditions.
