= King Sejong Station =

- Antarctic base
- Location of King Sejong Station in Antarctica
- Coordinates: 62°13′22″S 58°47′18″W
- Country: South Korea
- Location in Antarctica: Barton Peninsula; King George Island; Antarctica
- Administered by: Korea Polar Research Institute
- Established: 17 February 1988
- Named for: Sejong the Great
- Elevation: 10 m (33 ft)

Population (2017)
  - Summer: 68
  - Winter: 22
- UN/LOCODE: AQ KSG
- Type: All-year round
- Period: Annual
- Status: Operational
- Activities: Meteorology; Oceanography
- Website: Korea Polar Research Institute

Korean name
- Hangul: 세종과학기지
- Hanja: 世宗科學基地
- Lit.: Sejong Science Base
- RR: Sejong gwahak giji
- MR: Sejong kwahak kiji

The King Sejong Station (Korean: 세종과학기지) is a research station for the Korea Antarctic Research Program that is named after King Sejong the Great of Joseon (1397–1450).

Established on February 17, 1988, it consists of 11 facility buildings and two observatories, and it is located on the Barton Peninsula (King George Island), it is currently overseen by station chief scientist In-Young Ahn. It experiences a fairly mild climate subsequently drawing many animals for summer breeding.

In the summer, the station supports up to 68 people, including scientists and staff from the Korea Polar Research Institute and guest scientists from other institutions as well. Over winter, it accommodates only 22 engineers and scientists who maintain the station and routinely collect data (meteorological records, oceanographical parameters, etc.), but their main focus is on tracking the general change of the natural environment. Researchers from Korea continually collaborate with various other institutes in Antarctica and the rest of the world by participating in, monitoring, and contributing to the World Meteorological Organization, the Global Sea-level Observing System, the International Seismological Center, and the Intermagnet Project.

The station is usually re-supplied yearly by the RV Onnuri and more frequently by planes flying from Jubany in Argentina and the Chilean Eduardo Frei Base.

The RV Araon was commissioned in 2009, and she supplies South Korea's research stations, including the Jang Bogo Station.

== Research ==
The primary research that is conducted at the King Sejong Station:

- Environmental monitoring
- Geodesy/mapping
- Geomagnetic observations (since 1989)
- Glaciology - sea ice zone (since 1998)
- Ionospheric/auroral observations (since 1989)
- Lower/upper atmospheric science
- Meteorological observations
- Oceanography
- Offshore marine biology
- Onshore geology/geophysics
- Seismology
- Stratospheric ozone monitoring (since 1998)
- Terrestrial biology
- Tide measurement

== In popular culture ==
The station is used as a basis for the major tournament map King Sejong Station LE in the game StarCraft II: Heart of the Swarm.

== See also ==
- List of Antarctic research stations
- List of Antarctic field camps
