= Sv. Sv. Kiril i Metodii =

Bulgarian research vessel

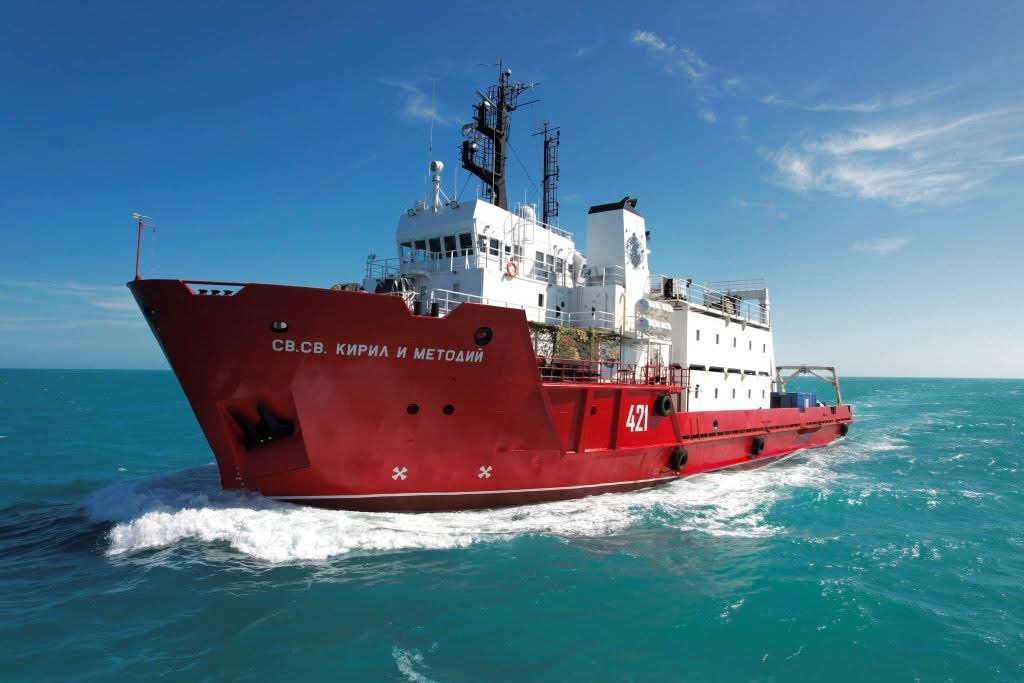
Sv. Sv. Kiril i Metodii RSV 421

Sv. Sv. Kiril i Metodii (RSV 421), "Св. св. Кирил и Методий", is a Bulgarian polar research vessel owned by the Bulgarian Naval Academy, the St. Kliment Ohridski University in Sofia, and the Bulgarian Antarctic Institute. The vessel is named after Sts. Cyril and Methodius, it was built in 1984 and it is 65m long.

== History ==
=== 33rd Bulgarian Antarctic Expedition 2024–2025 ===
On 7 November 2024, Sv. Sv. Kiril i Metodii left Varna with a crew of 34, beginning the 33rd Bulgarian Antarctic Expedition, and on 28 December, the vessel reached the St Kliment Ohridski Antarctic Base on Livingston Island. On 10 January, the ship's crew became the first Bulgarians to visit Smith Island. In January 2025, the vessel delivered equipment to the Spanish Antarctic base Gabriel de Castilla on Deception Island. On 30 January, the vessel sailed from Livingston Island to Byers Peninsula, Greenwich Island, and King George Island to transfer personnel between Bulgarian, Spanish, and Ecuadorian bases. In early February 2025, the vessel sailed to Deception Island and back to transfer of six Spanish scientists. On 16 February, the vessel departed Livingston Island with all passengers and participants of the 33rd Bulgarian Antarctic Expedition on board and on 18 February, they crossed Drake Passage on their way to Comodoro Rivadavia, Argentina, where they docked on February 22. Some participants of the expedition returned to Bulgaria by flying from Argentina, while the vessel continued its voyage home. On 11 April 2025, Sv. Sv. Kiril i Metodii returned to Varna, concluding the expedition. The research vessel travelled 19,725 miles in 155 days during this voyage, which was its third expedition to Antarctica.

=== 34th Bulgarian Antarctic Expedition 2025–2026 ===
On 7 November 2025, the vessel has departed from Varna on its 4th voyage to Antarctica with Bulgaria's 34th Antarctic expedition. The ship docked at Punta Arenas on 21 December and then arrived at St. Kliment Ohridski Base on 26 December, marking the start of the active phase of the expedition.

== See also ==
- 2025 in Antarctica
- List of research vessels by country
