= Jang Bogo Station =

South Korean Antarctic research station

- Antarctic base
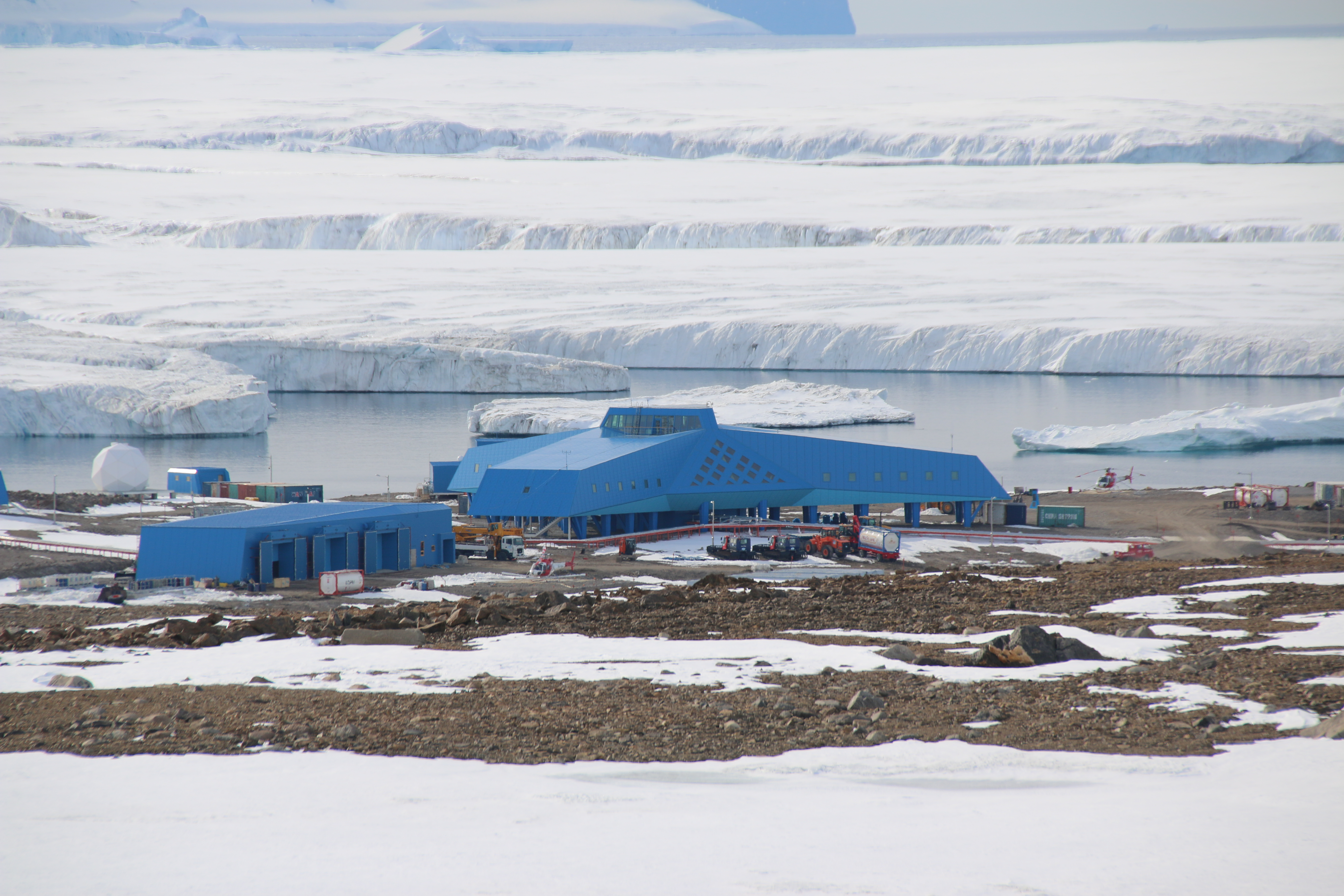
- South Korean Jang Bogo Station seen from a ridge south of it in January 2017

- Location of Jang Bogo Station in Antarctica
- Coordinates: 74°37′26″S 164°13′44″E
- Country: South Korea
- Location in Antarctica: Terra Nova Bay; Ross Sea
- Administered by: Korea Polar Research Institute
- Established: February 2014
- Elevation: 36.6 m (120 ft)

Population (2017)
  - Summer: 62
  - Winter: 23
- UN/LOCODE: AQ JBS
- Type: All-year round
- Period: Annual
- Status: Operational
- Activities: Climate change
- Website: Korea Polar Research Institute

Korean name
- Hangul: 장보고과학기지
- Hanja: 張保皐科學基地
- RR: Jang Bogo gwahak giji
- MR: Chang Pogo kwahak kiji

The Jang Bogo Station (Korean: 장보고과학기지) in Terra Nova Bay, Antarctica is a permanent South Korean research station. It is the second base of South Korean Antarctic research mission (after King Sejong Station), and the first that is located in mainland Antarctica. Completed in February 2014, the station houses 23 people in winter and 62 in summer in a 4000 square-metre building with three wings, and is one of the larger permanent bases in Antarctica.

The base, named after an eighth-century maritime ruler of Korea, is located in the Ross Dependency and near the Zucchelli Station of Italy. It was built by Hyundai Engineering and Construction, with material shipped from Busan to Lyttelton, New Zealand for transfer to the new Korean icebreaker, the RS Araon. For aeronautic operations such as the transport of personnel or cargo, the base is supported by the Italian Antarctic Program using the ice runway operated by Zucchelli Station in Tethys Bay.

Jang Bogo Station opened on 12 February 2014. A dedication ceremony was held for it by the Ministry of Oceans and Fisheries.

== See also ==
- Research stations in Antarctica
- List of Antarctic field camps
- King Sejong Station, the first South Korean research mission in Antarctica, completed in 1988.
