= RV Araon =

Korean antarctic research ship

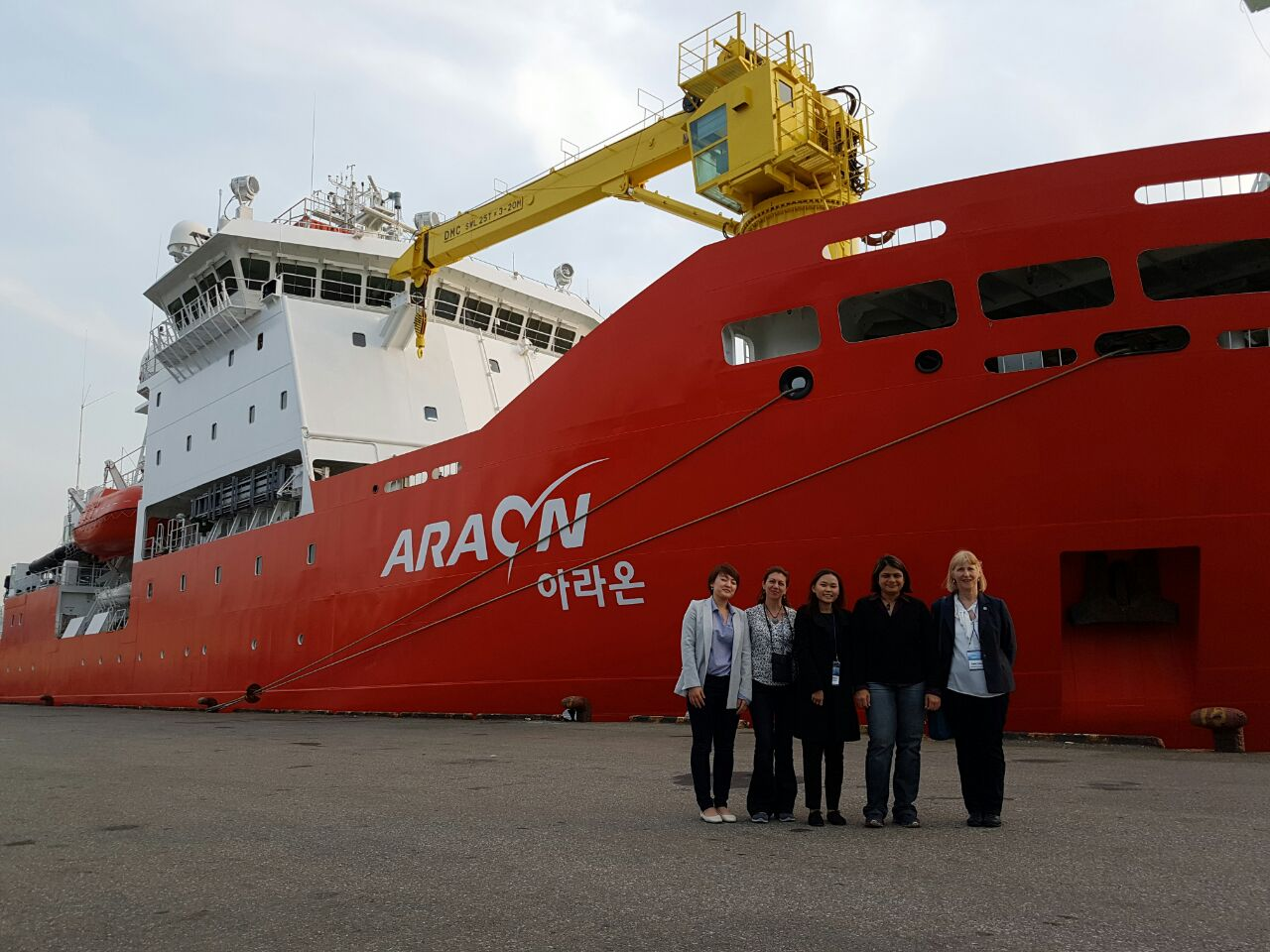
- RV Araon in 2016

History

South Korea
- Name: Araon
- Operator: Korea Polar Research Institute, South Korea
- Builder: Hanjin Heavy Industries, Yeongdo shipyard, Busan
- Cost: 108 billion won
- Laid down: May 2008
- Launched: June 11, 2009
- Completed: September 2009
- Home port: Incheon, South Korea
- Identification: IMO number: 9490935; MMSI number: 441619000; Callsign: DSQL7
- Status: In service

General characteristics
- Type: Research ship
- Tonnage: 6,950 GT
- Length: 109.5 m (359 ft 3 in)
- Beam: 19.0 m (62 ft 4 in)
- Depth: 9.9 m (32 ft 6 in)
- Ice class: KR PL-10 (DNV Polar-10)
- Installed power: Four diesel engines (4 × 3,400 kW)
- Propulsion: Diesel-electric; Two azimuth thrusters; Two bow thrusters
- Speed: 12 knots (22 km/h; 14 mph) (service); 16 knots (30 km/h; 18 mph) (max); 3 knots (5.6 km/h; 3.5 mph) in 1 m (3 ft 3 in) ice
- Range: 20,000 nautical miles (37,000 km; 23,000 mi)
- Endurance: 70 days
- Boats & landing craft carried: 10 m barge capable of carrying 20 ft (6.1 m) container; 7 m work boat
- Capacity: 31 TEU on deck, 15 TEU in cargo hold
- Crew: 25; Up to 60 scientific personnel

RV Araon is a large icebreaker operated by the Government of South Korea. The vessel was commissioned in 2009. She supplies the King Sejong Station, and the Jang Bogo Station, South Korea's second Antarctic research station.

She underwent her sea trials in January 2010, in the Ross Sea. Her first foreign port of call was Lyttelton, New Zealand.

The first location her crew investigated, for a South Korean Antarctic base, in the Cape Burks area, was not deemed suitable, and she then investigated the selected site in Terra Nova Bay.

In December 2011, she was instrumental in the rescue of the Russian trawler Sparta, trapped in Antarctic sea ice.

Her class notation is KRS1-Special purpose ship (Research vessel) PL10, DAT (-30 deg. C), HMS1, KRM1-UMA3, DPS2, NBS2.

== See also ==
- List of research vessels by country
