= Women in Antarctica =

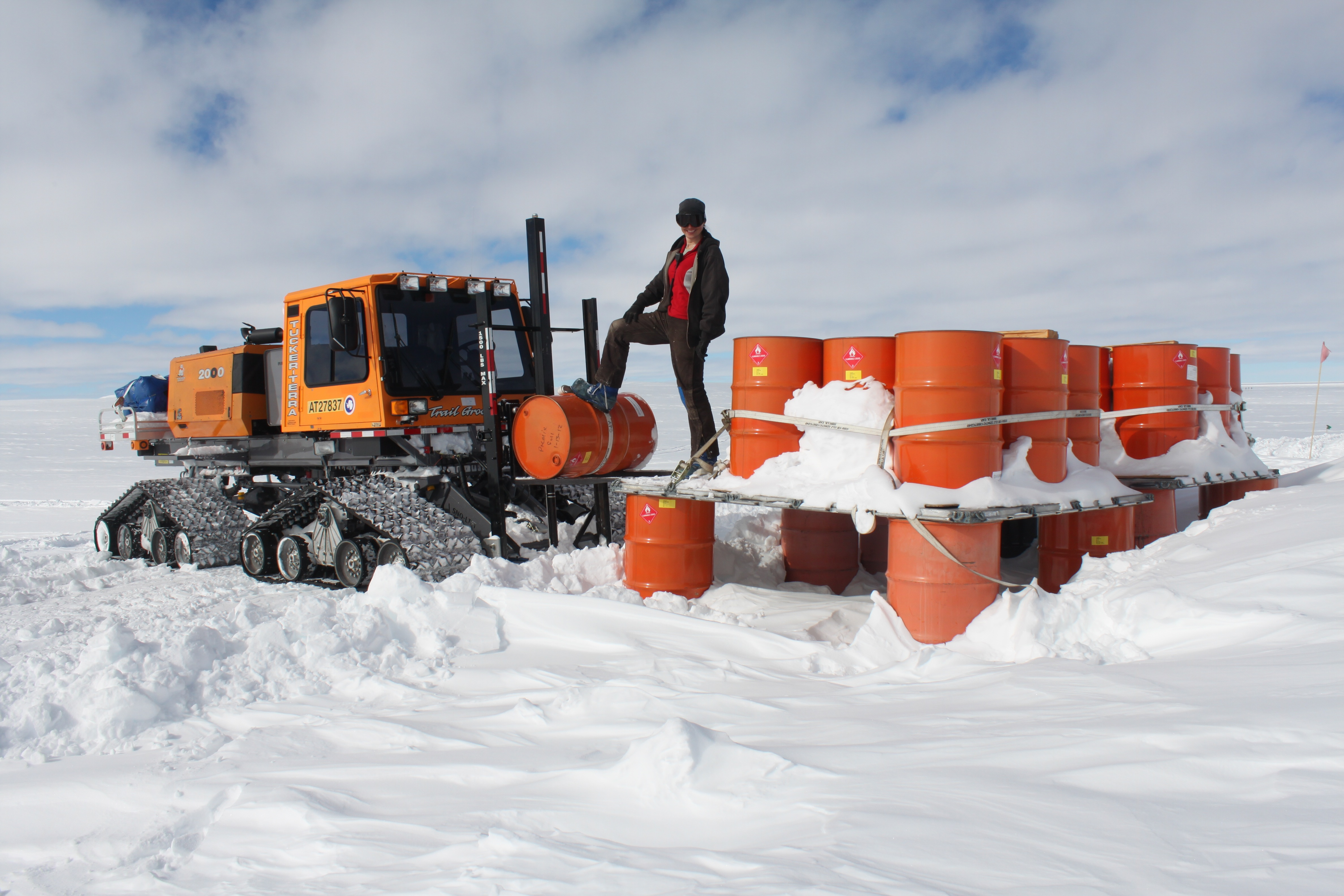
A woman working at the West Antarctic Ice Sheet (WAIS) Divide Field Camp in 2012.

Women have been exploring the regions around Antarctica for many centuries. The most celebrated "first" for women in Antarctica was in 1935 when Caroline Mikkelsen became the first woman to set foot on one of Antarctica's islands. Early male explorers, such as Richard Byrd, named areas of Antarctica after wives and female heads of state. As Antarctica moved from a place of exploration and conquest to a scientific frontier, women worked to be included in the sciences. The first countries to have female scientists working in Antarctica were the Soviet Union, South Africa and Argentina.

Besides exploring and working as scientists, women have also played supportive roles as wives, fund-raisers, publicists, historians, curators and administrators of organizations and services that support Antarctic operations. Many early women on Antarctica were the wives of explorers. Some women worked with Antarctica from afar, crafting policies for a place they had never seen. Women who wished to have larger roles in Antarctica and on the continent itself had to "overcome gendered assumptions about the ice and surmount bureaucratic inertia". As women began to break into fields in Antarctica, they found that it could be difficult to compete against men who already had the "expeditioner experience" needed for permanent science positions. Women who were qualified for expeditions or jobs in Antarctica were less likely to be selected than men, even after a 1995 study by Jane Mocellin showed that women cope better than men with the Antarctic environment.

== Historic barriers against inclusion ==
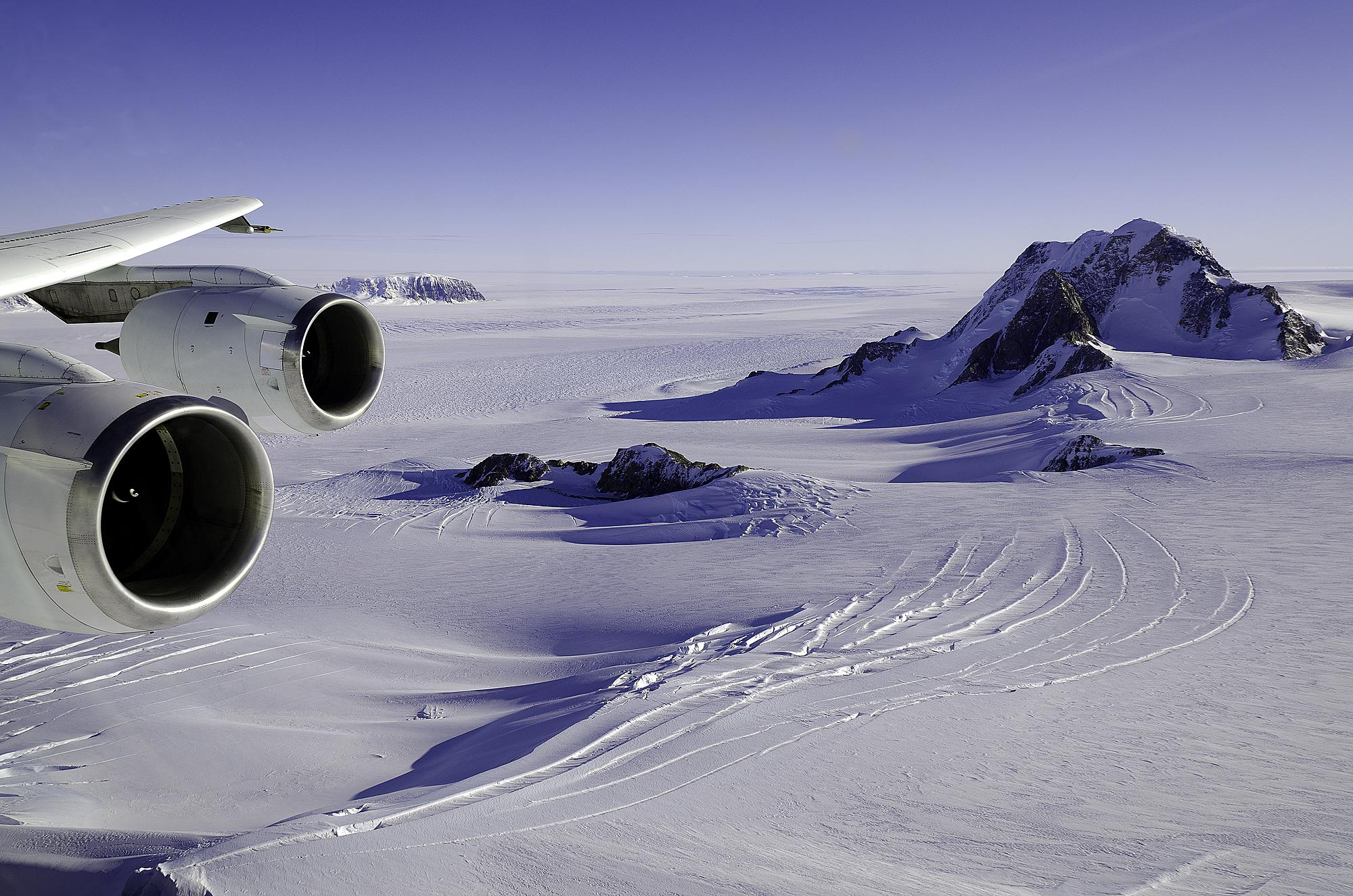
Mary Byrd Land, named after the wife of Rear Admiral Richard E. Byrd in 1929.

Most early policies and practices, including the construction and creation of Antarctic organizations, were created initially by men. Women were originally excluded from early exploration in Antarctica based on the opinion that women could not handle the extremes in temperature or crisis situations. Vivian Fuchs, who was in charge of the British Antarctic Survey in the 1960s, believed that women could not carry heavy equipment and that Antarctic facilities were unsuitable for women. The United States believed for many years that the climate of Antarctic was too harsh for women.

Antarctica was seen by many men as a place where men could imagine themselves heroic conquerors. In Western culture, frontier territories are often associated with masculinity. Antarctica itself was envisioned by many male explorers as a "virginal woman" or "monstrous feminine body" to be conquered by men. Women were often "invoked in terms of place naming and territorial conquest and later even encouraged to have babies in Antarctica." Using women as territorial conquest is literal in the way that Argentina flew pregnant women to Antarctica to give birth and stake a national claim to the area. Silvia Morella de Palma was the first woman to give birth in Antarctica, delivering 3.4 kg (7 lb 8 oz) Emilio Palma at the Argentine Esperanza base 7 January 1978.

Men enjoyed having a space that was free of women and which, in the late 1940s, "allowed them to continue the kind of male companionship and adventure they had enjoyed during the Second World War." In one news article about Antarctica written in 1958, the writer describes the use of dazzlement: "On the womanless continent, the purpose of the dazzlement is not to catch the eye of a flirtatious blonde, but to attract spotters in the event that the explorers become lost in the frozen waste." Men's space in Antarctica resisted change. In the 1980s, there was an attempt by men to memorialize the "Sistine ceiling" of the Weddell hut in Antarctica as an Australian national heritage site of "high significance." The "Sistine ceiling" was covered in 92 different pinups of women from the 1970s and 1980s. This represented a "male's only club" in which participants believed women would spoil the "purity of a homosocial work, and play, environment." In 1983, the San Bernardino County Sun newspaper published an article about Antarctica stating that it "is still one of the last macho redoubts, where men are men and women are superfluous." One scientist, Lyle McGinnis, who had been going to Antarctica since 1957, resented women in the field saying that "men never grouse." He believed that women complained and needed "comfort." Not all men felt that way. Other men felt that women's presence made life in Antarctica better and one male engineer stated that without women around, "men are pigs." Sociologist Charles Moskos stated that as more women are introduced to a group, there is less aggression and a "more civil culture develops."

Many of the careers in Antarctica are in the sciences and women faced barriers there as well. As women attempted to work in science, arguments using biological determinism, evolutionary psychology and popular notions of neurobiology were used as excuses as to why there were fewer women in the sciences. These arguments described how "women are ill-adapted on evolutionary grounds for science and the competitive environment of the laboratory." Some women described feeling that they were "a bit of a joke" working in Antarctica and felt that men regarded them as incapable.

Antarctic exploration and science research was often facilitated by national navies, who often did not want women on their ships. The United States Navy used the excuse that "sanitation facilities were too primitive" on Antarctica as an excuse to bar women. The U.S. Navy also considered Antarctica a "male-only bastion." Admiral George Dufek said in 1956 that "women would join American Teams in the Antarctic over his dead body." He also believed that women's presence on Antarctica "would wreck men's illusions of being heroes and frontiersmen." Military groups also were worried about "sexual misconduct."

Change was slow as women began to try to become part of Antarctic exploration and research. An article run in The Daily Herald newspaper of Chicago in 1974 described women finally coming to Antarctica as integrating the "land with a definite feminine touch." The article described women's perfumed smells, ways of entertaining guests on Antarctica and the "dainty feet" of Caroline Mikkelsen. Eventually both the "presence and impact of female Antarctic researchers has increased rapidly."

== Early women involved in Antarctica ==
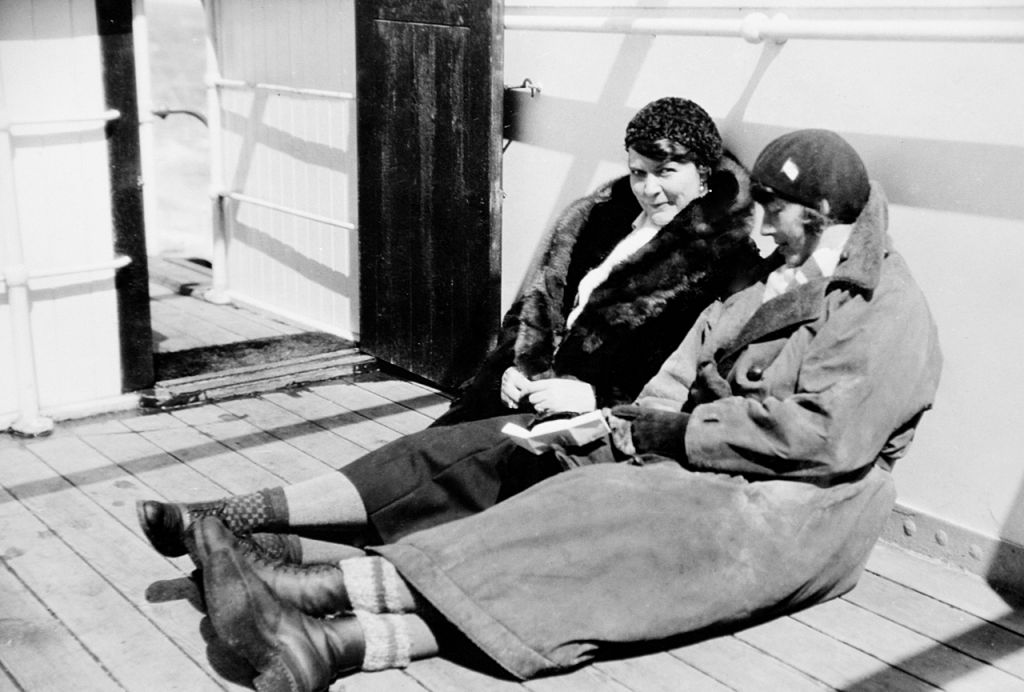
Ingrid Christensen (left) and Mathilde Wegger on a voyage in 1931.

Oral records from Oceania indicate that women explorers may have traveled to the Antarctic regions like male explorers Ui-te-Rangiora around 650 CE and Te Ara-tanga-nuku in 1000 CE, but this is unconfirmed. The first western woman to visit the Antarctic region was Louise Séguin, who sailed on the Roland with Yves Joseph de Kerguelen in 1773.

The oldest known human remains in Antarctica was a skull that belonged to a young Indigenous Chilean woman on Yamana Beach at the South Shetland Islands, which dates back to 1819 to 1825. Her remains were found by the Chilean Antarctic Institute in 1985.

In the early twentieth century, women were interested in going to Antarctica. When Ernest Shackleton advertised his 1914 Antarctic expedition, three women wrote to him, requesting to join. The women never became part of the journey. In 1919, newspapers reported that women wanted to go to Antarctica, writing that "several women were anxious to join, but their applications were refused." Later, in 1929, twenty-five women applied to the British, Australian and New Zealand Antarctic Research Expedition (BANZARE). They were also rejected. When a privately funded British Antarctic Expedition was proposed in 1937, 1,300 women applied to join. None of those 1,300 were accepted. After 3 years of attempted funding the expedition was cancelled with the onset of World War Two.

Women who were wives of explorers who were left behind "endured years of loneliness and anxiety." Women like Kathleen Scott raised money for their husbands' journeys.

The first women involved in exploration of Antarctica were wives and companions of male travelers and explorers. Women accompanied men as "whaling wives" to Antarctic waters. The first women to see the continent of Antarctica was Norwegian Ingrid Christensen and her companion, Mathilde Wegger, both of whom were traveling with Christensen's husband. The first woman to step onto the land of Antarctica, an island, was Caroline Mikkelsen in 1935. Mikkelsen only briefly went ashore and was also there with her husband. Later, after her husband died, Mikkelsen remarried and didn't talk about her experience in Antarctica in order "to spare his feelings." Christensen went back to Antarctica three times after her first glimpse of the land. She eventually landed at Scullin monolith, becoming the first woman to set foot on the Antarctic mainland. She was followed by her daughter, Augusta Sofie Christensen, and two other women, Lillemor Rachlew and Solveig Widerøe. Because the women believed the landing wasn't an actual "first," they didn't make much of their accomplishment.

In the years of 1946 and 1947, Jackie Ronne and Jennie Darlington were the first women to spend the year in Antarctica. When Ronne and Darlington decided to accompany their husbands in 1946 to Antarctica, men on the expedition "signed a petition trying to stop it happening." Ronne worked as the mission's "recorder." Ronne and Darlington both wrote about their experiences on the ice and, in the case of Darlington's book, about how conflict between team members also "strained relations between the two women." One of the ways that Darlington tried to fit in with the men of the group was to make herself as "inconspicuous within the group as possible." One man, first seeing Darlington arrive at the Antarctic base, "fled in fright, thinking that he'd gone mad." Both women, upon returning from Antarctica, downplayed their own roles letting "their husbands take most of the honour."

In 1948, the British diplomat, Margaret Anstee, was involved in the Falkland Islands Dependency Survey (FIDS) and helped make policy for the program.

== Further exploration and science ==
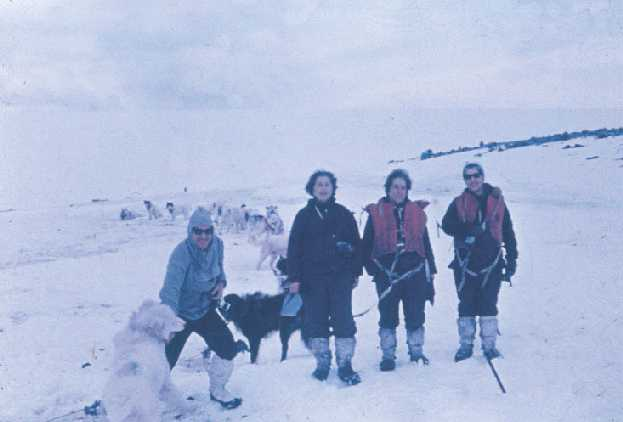
Irene Bernasconi and others in 1968 at Esperanza Base

Women scientists first began researching Antarctica from ships. The first woman scientist, Maria V. Klenova of the Soviet Union, worked on the ships Ob and Lena just off the Antarctic coastline in 1955 to 1956. Klenova's work helped create the first Antarctic atlas. Women served on Soviet Union ships going to Antarctica after 1963. The first women to visit a US station and the first to fly to Antarctica were Pat Hepinstall and Ruth Kelley, Pan Am flight attendants who spent four hours on the ground at the McMurdo Station on 15 October 1957.

Often women going to Antarctica had to be approved in both official and unofficial ways. An early candidate for becoming one of the first women scientists to go to Antarctica was geologist Dawn Rodley. She had been approved of not only by the expedition sponsor, Colin Bull, but also by the wives of the male team-members. Rodley was set to go in 1958, but the United States Navy, who were in charge of Operation Deep Freeze, refused to take her to Antarctica.

The Navy decided that sending a four-woman team would be acceptable and Bull began to build a team including Lois Jones, Kay Lindsay, Eileen McSaveney and Terry Tickhill. These four women were part of the group who became the first women to visit the South Pole. Jones's team worked mainly in Wright Valley. After their return, Bull found that several of his male friends resented the addition of women and even called him a "traitor". The first United States all-female team was led by Jones in 1969. Her team, which included the first women to set foot on the South Pole, were used by the navy as a publicity stunt. They were "paraded around" and called "Powderpuff explorers". The first United States woman to step into the Antarctic interior in 1970 was engineer Irene C Peden, who also faced various barriers to her working on the continent. Peden described how a "mythology had been created about the women who'd gone to the coast – that they had been a problem," and that since they had not published their work within the year, they were "heavily criticized." Men in the Navy in charge of approving her trip to Antarctica were "dragging their feet", citing that there were not women's bathrooms available and that without another female companion, she would not be allowed to go. The admiral in charge of transportation to Antarctica suggested that Peden was trying to go there for adventure, or to find a husband, rather than for her research. Despite her setbacks, including not receiving critical equipment in Antarctica, Peden's research on the continent was successful.

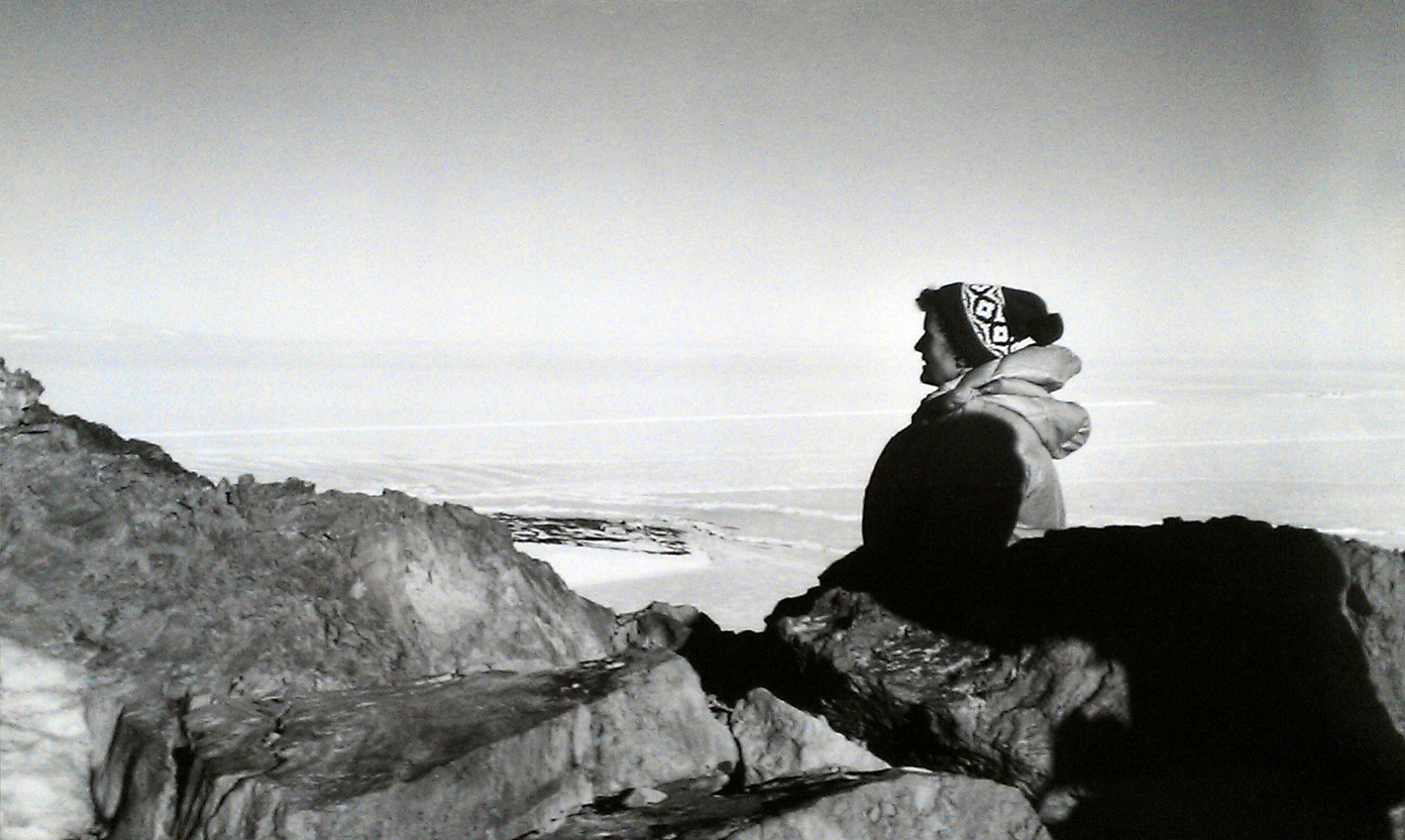
Ursula B. Marvin in Antarctica, 1978–1979

The first two U.S. woman to winter at a U.S. Antarctic research station were Mary Alice McWhinnie and Mary Odile Cahoon. Mary Alice was the station science leader (chief scientist) at McMurdo Station in 1974 and Mary Odile was a nun and biologist. United States women in 1978 were still using equipment and arctic clothing designed for men, although "officials said that problem is being quickly remedied." American Ann Peoples became the manager of the Berg Field Center in 1986, becoming the first woman to serve in a "significant leadership role".

British women had similar problems to the Americans. The director of the British Antarctic Survey (BAS) from 1959 to 1973 was Vivian Fuchs, who "firmly believed that the inclusion of women would disrupt the harmony and scientific productivity of Antarctic stations." British women scientists started working on curating collections as part of the BAS prior to being allowed to visit Antarctica. Women who applied to the BAS were discouraged. A letter from BAS personnel sent to a woman who applied in the 1960s read, "Women wouldn't like it in Antarctica as there are no shops and no hairdresser." The first BAS woman to go to Antarctica was Janet Thomson in 1983 who described the ban on women as a "rather improper segregation." Women were still effectively barred from using UK bases and logistics in 1987. Women didn't overwinter at the Halley Research Station until 1996, forty years after the British station was established.

Argentina sent four women scientists, biologist Irene Bernasconi, bacteriologist María Adela Caría, biologist Elena Martinez Fontes and algae expert Carmen Pujals, to Antarctica in 1968. They were the first group of female scientists to conduct research in Antarctica. Bernasconi was the first woman to lead an Antarctic expedition. She was aged 72 at the time. Later, in 1978, Argentina sent a pregnant woman, Silvia Morello de Palma, to the Esperanza Base to give birth and to "use the baby to stake [their] territorial claims" to Antarctica.

Once Australia opened up travel to Antarctica for women, Elizabeth Chipman, who first worked as a typist at Casey Station in 1976, chronicled all of the women to travel there up to 1984. Chipman worked to find the names of all women who had ever been to or even near Antarctica and eventually donated 19 folio boxes of her research to the National Library of Australia.

== Women gain ground ==
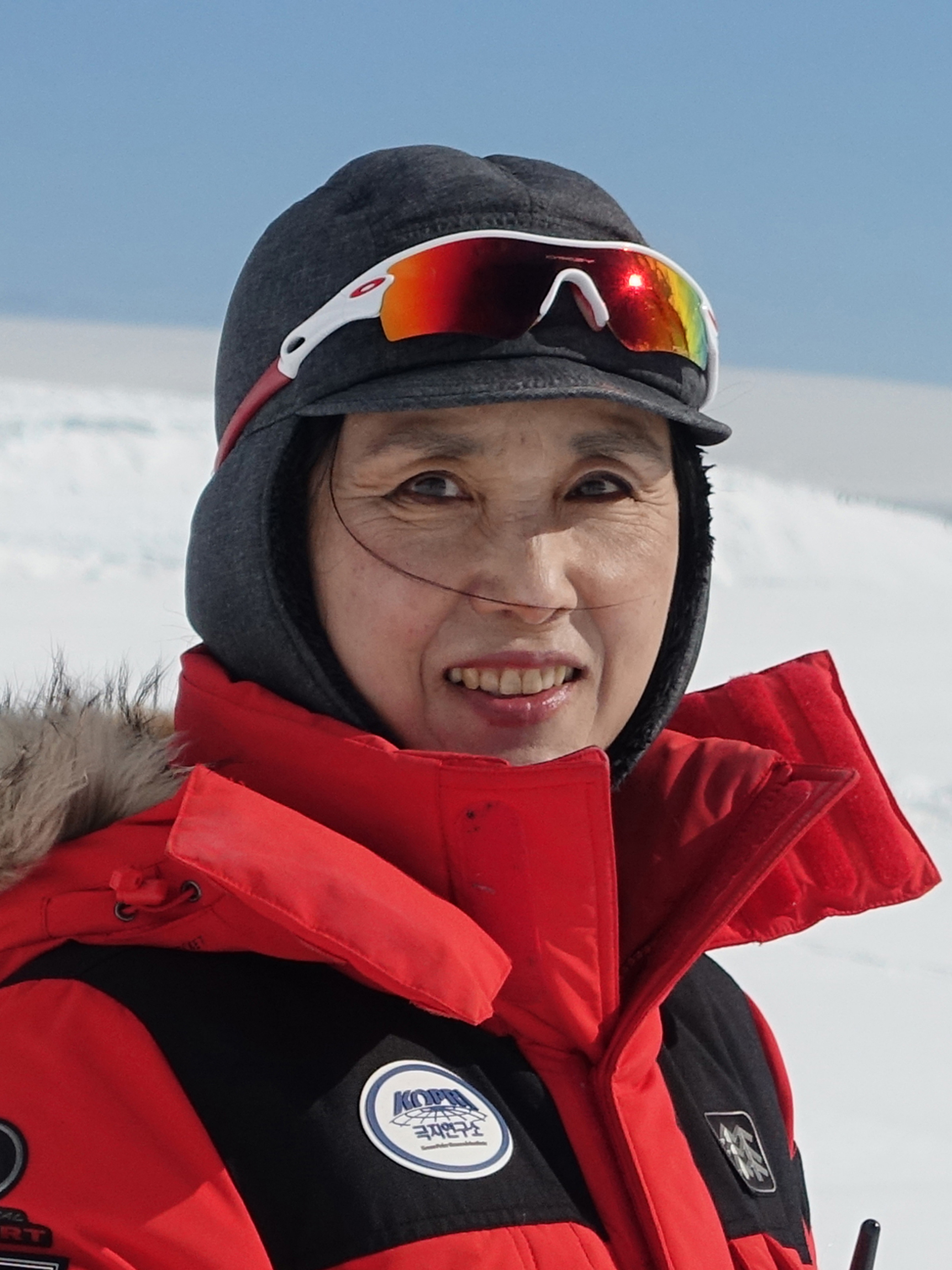
In-Young Ahn at King Sejong Station in Antarctica in 2015.

The National Science Foundation (NSF) started long-range planning in 1978, looking towards facilities that could accommodate a population made up of 25% women. In the 1979–1980 season, there were only 43 women on the continent. By 1981, there were nearly one woman for every ten men in Antarctica. In 1983, the ratio was back to 20 men for every woman. In the 1980s, Susan Solomon's research in Antarctica on the ozone layer and the "ozone hole" causes her to gain "fame and acclaim."

In Spain, Josefina Castellví, helped coordinate and also participated in her country's expedition to Antarctica in 1984. Later, after a Spanish base was constructed in 1988, Castellví was put in charge after the leader, Antoni Ballester, had a stroke.

The first female station leader on Antarctica was Australian, Diana Patterson, head of Mawson Station in 1989. The first woman station leader in charge of an American Antarctic station was LT Trina Baldwin, CEC, USN (Civil Engineer Corps, United States Navy). The first all-female overwintering group was from Germany and spent the 1990–1991 winter at Georg von Neumayer. The first German female station leader and medical doctor was Monika Puskeppeleit. In 1991 In-Young Ahn was the first female leader of an Asian research station (King Sejong Station) and the first South Korean woman to step onto Antarctica.

There were approximately 180 women in Antarctica during the 1990–1991 season. Women from several different countries were regular members of overwintering teams by 1992. The first all-women expedition reached the South Pole in 1993. Diana Patterson, the first female station leader on Antarctica, saw change coming in 1995. She felt that many of the sexist views of the past had given way so that women were judged not by the fact that they were women, but "by how well you did your job."

During the 1994 austral winter, women managed all three of the American Antarctic stations: Janet Phillips at Amundsen-Scott South Pole Station, Karen Schwall at McMurdo Station and Ann Peoples at Palmer Station.

Social scientist, Robin Burns, studied the social structures of Antarctica in the 1995–1996 season. She found that while many earlier women struggled, there was more acceptance of women in Antarctica during the 1995 - 1996 season. One of the station managers, Ann Peoples, felt that a tipping point had been reached during the 1990s and that life for women on Antarctica became more normal. There were still men in Antarctica who were not afraid to voice their opinion that women should not "be on the ice," but many others enjoyed having "women as colleagues and friends." Women around this time began to feel like it was "taken for granted now that women go to the Antarctic."

Studies done in the early 2000s showed that women's inclusion in Antarctic groups were beneficial overall. In the early 2000s, Robin Burns had found that female scientists who enjoyed their experience in Antarctica, were the ones who were able to finish their scientific work and to complete their projects.

== Recent history ==
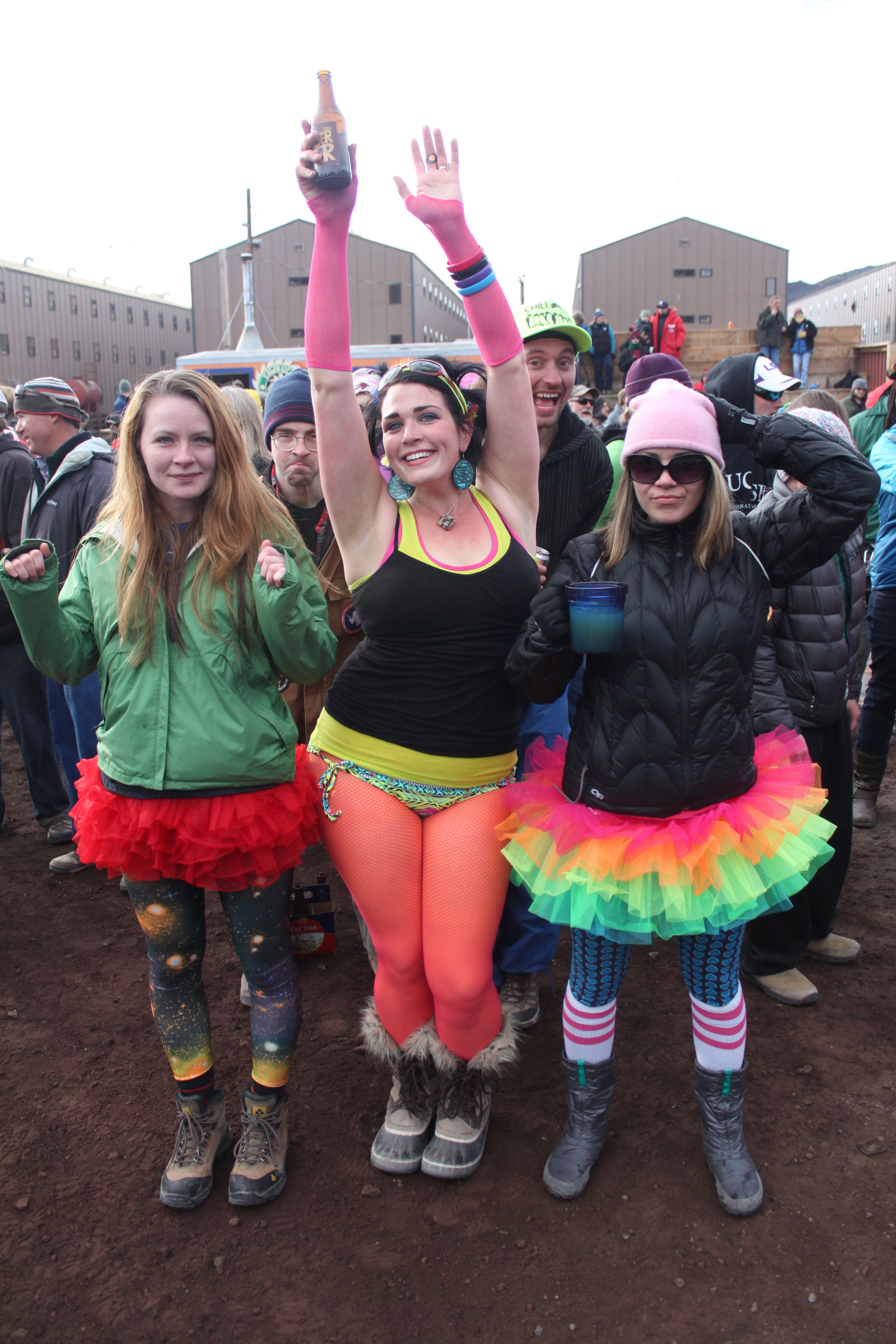
Women celebrate at 2013 Icestock in Antarctica.

American Lynne Cox swam a mile in Antarctic water in 2003.

In 2005, writer Gretchen Legler described how there were many more women in Antarctica that year and that some were lesbians. International Women's Day in 2012 saw more than fifty women celebrating in Antarctica and who made up 70% of the International Antarctic Expedition. In 2013, when the Netherlands opened their first Antarctic Lab, Corina Brussaard was there to help set it up.

Homeward Bound was a 10-year program designed to encourage women's participation in science and planned to send the first large (78 member) all-women expedition to Antarctica in 2016. The first group, consisting of 76 women, arrived in Antarctica for three weeks in December 2016. Fabian Dattner and Jess Melbourne-Thomas founded the project and the Dattner Grant provided funding. Each participant contributed $15,000 to the project. Homeward bound included businesswomen and scientists who look at climate change and women's leadership. The plan was to create a network of 1,000 women who would become leaders in the sciences. The first voyage departed South America in December 2016

An all-woman team of United Kingdom Army soldiers, called Exercise Ice Maiden, started recruiting members in 2015 to cross the continent under their own power in 2017. It intended to study women's performance in the extreme antarctic summer environment. A team of six women completed the journey in 62 days after starting on 20 November 2017.

Currently, women make up 55% of membership in the Association of Polar Early Career Scientists (APECS). In 2016, nearly a third of all researchers at the South Pole were women. The Australian Antarctic Program (AAP) makes a "conscious effort to recruit women."

A social media network has recently been created, "Women in Polar Science". It aims to connect women working in the Arctic and Antarctic sciences and provides them with a platform to share and exchange knowledge, experiences and opportunities.

== Sexual harassment and sexism ==
When heavy equipment operator, Julia Uberuaga, first went to Antarctica in the late 70s and early 80s, she recalled that "the men stared at her, or leered at her, or otherwise let her know she was unwelcome on the job." Rita Matthews, who went to Antarctica during the same period, said that the "men were all over the place. There were some that would never stop going after you." In 1983, Marilyn Woody described living at McMurdo station and said, "It makes your head spin, all this attention from all these men." Then she said, "You realize you can put a bag over your head and they'll still fall in love with you."

Another scientist, Cynthia McFee, had been completely shut out of the "male camaraderie" at her location and had to deal with loneliness for long periods of time. Martha Kane, the second woman to overwinter at the South Pole, experienced "negative pressure" from men with "some viewing her as an interloper who had insinuated herself into a male domain."

In the 1990s, some women experienced stigma in Antarctica. These women were labeled "whores" for interacting with men and those who did not interact with men were called "dykes."

In the late 1990s and early 2000s, women felt that Antarctic operations were "not at all sympathetic to the needs of mothers and that there is a deep concern lest a pregnant woman give birth in Antarctica."

Sexual harassment is still a problem for women working in Antarctica, with many women scientists fielding unwanted sexual advances over and over again. Women continue to be outnumbered in many careers in Antarctica, including fleet operations and trades.

Some organizations, such as the Australian Antarctic Division, have created and adopted policies to combat sexual harassment and discrimination based on gender. The United States Antarctic Program (USAP) encourages women and minorities to apply.

== Women record-breakers ==
Silvia Morella de Palma was the first woman to give birth in Antarctica, delivering 3.4 kg (7 lb 8 oz) Emilio Palma at the Argentine Esperanza base on 7 January 1978.

In 1988 American Lisa Densmore became the first woman to reach the summit Mount Vinson.

In 1993, American Ann Bancroft led the first all woman expedition to the South Pole. Bancroft, and Norwegian Liv Arnesen, were the first women to ski across Antarctica in 2001.

In 2010, the first female chaplain to serve on the continent of Antarctica was Chaplain, Lt Col Laura Adelia of the U.S. Air Force, where she served the people at McMurdo Station.

Maria Leijerstam became the first person to cycle to the South Pole from the edge of the continent in 2013. She cycled on a recumbent tricycle.

Anja Blacha set the record for the longest solo, unsupported, unassisted polar expedition by a woman in 2020.

== Honors and awards ==
In 1975, Eleanor Honnywill became the first woman to be awarded the Fuchs Medal from the British Antarctic Survey (BAS).

The first woman to receive a Polar Medal was Virginia Fiennes, in 1986. She was honored for her work in the Transglobe Expedition. She was also the first woman to "winter in both polar regions."

Denise Allen was the first woman awarded the Australian Antarctic Medal in 1989.

== See also ==
- Arctic exploration
- European and American voyages of scientific exploration
- Farthest South
- Heroic Age of Antarctic Exploration
- History of Antarctica
- List of Antarctic women
- List of polar explorers
- Patricia Hepinstall and Ruth Kelley
- Timeline of women in Antarctica
- Women in science
- Women in space
