= Timeline of women in Antarctica =

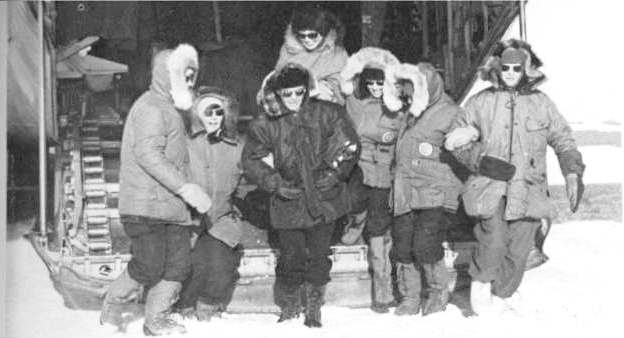
The first women at the South Pole were Pamela Young, Jean Pearson, Lois Jones, Eileen McSaveney, Kay Lindsay and Terry Tickhill on 12 November 1969. Rear Admiral David F. Welch is in the middle.

This is a Timeline of women in Antarctica. This article describes many of the firsts and accomplishments that women from various countries have accomplished in different fields of endeavor on the continent of Antarctica.

== 650s ==
650

- Māori legend, Ui-te-rangiora, is described in oral tradition as having reached Antarctic waters. Women were included in these explorations.

== 1770s ==
1773

- The first confirmed woman to visit the Antarctic region was Louise Séguin, who sailed on the Roland with Yves Joseph de Kerguelen in 1773.

1776-1777

- First female scientist in the sub-Antarctic region is botanist valet, Jeanne Baret.

== 1830s ==
1833

- First written account about sub-Antarctic travel from a woman's perspective is written by Abby Jane Morrell.

1839

- An unnamed female castaway who later traveled on the Eliza Scott and Sabrina journeyed "within sight of the continent."

== 1900s ==
1908-1910

- Adolf Amandus Andresen, the Norwegian manager of the Sociedad Ballenera Magallanes, was accompanied by his wife in a whaling expedition in Deception Island. Meeting the French Antarctic expedition, Mrs. Andresen is mentioned in Jean-Baptiste Charcot's journal as "probably the first and only woman who ever came to Antarctica".

== 1930s ==
1931

- Norwegian Ingrid Christensen and her companion, Mathilde Wegger, were the first recorded women to see Antarctica.

1935

- Caroline Mikkelsen of Denmark becomes the first woman to set foot on Antarctica.

1937

- Christensen landed at Scullin Monolith, becoming the first woman to set foot on the Antarctic mainland, followed by her daughter, Augusta Sofie Christensen, and two other women: Lillemor Rachlew, and Solveig Widerøe.

== 1940s ==
1947

- Jackie Ronne is the first woman to explore Antarctica.

1947-1948

- Ronne and Jennie Darlington winter-over. They are the first women to spend a year on Antarctica.

== 1950s ==
1956

- Geologist Maria Klenova of the Soviet Union was the first woman to begin scientific work in Antarctica. Klenova helped create the first Antarctic atlas.
- Jennie Darlington publishes her book about spending a year in Antarctica called My Antarctic Honeymoon.

1957

- Ruth Kelley and Pat Heppinstall, airline stewardesses, become first women to visit a United States Antarctic base.

1959-1960

- Mary Gillham, Susan Ingham, Isobel Bennett and Hope MacPherson became the first British and Australian women scientists to do research in the Antarctic region, joining an Australian National Antarctic Research Expedition trip to Macquarie Island in December 1959.

== 1960s ==
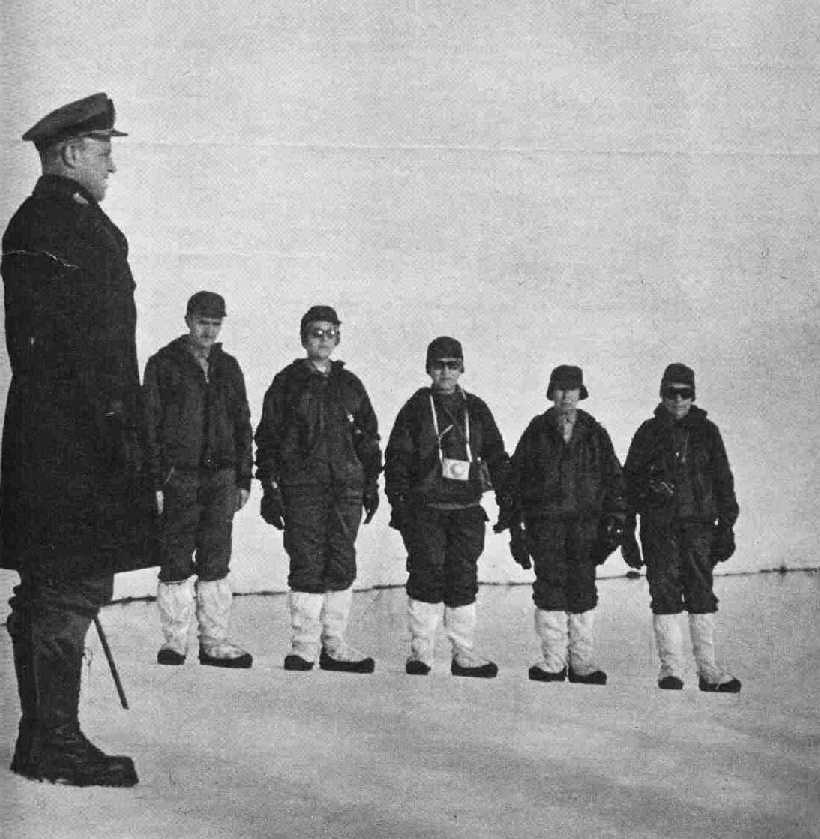
The first female Argentinian scientists in Antarctica during 1968

1960

- Artist Nel Law is the first Australian woman to set foot in Antarctica, landing at Mawson and visiting in an unofficial capacity.

1968

- The first group of female scientists conducted research in Antarctica. They included biologist Irene Bernasconi, bacteriologist María Adela Caría, biologist Elena Martinez Fontes and Carmen Pujals, a specialist in algae. This made Bernasconi the first woman to lead an Antarctic expedition. She was aged 72 at the time.
- The first New Zealand woman to visit the mainland of Antarctica was Marie Darby.

1969

- First team of women scientists from the United States, led by Lois Jones, works on Antarctica.
- First group of women to reach the pole were Pamela Young, Jean Pearson, Lois Jones, Eileen McSaveney, Kay Lindsay and Terry Tickhill. The women stepped off of the C-130 ramp at the same time.
- Christine Müller-Schwarze is the first American woman to do scientific research on the continent of Antarctica.

== 1970s ==
1970

- Engineer Irene C. Peden is the first United States woman to work in the interior of Antarctica.

1971

- New Zealand limnologist Ann Chapman leads a biological survey of frozen lakes in the Taylor Valley, becoming the first woman to lead an Antarctic expedition.

1973

- Duke University Group includes technicians Hana Pinshow, the first Israeli woman to set foot on the continent, and Katy Muzik.

1974

- Mary Alice McWhinnie is the chief scientist at McMurdo Station, becoming the first United States woman serving in that capacity on Antarctica.
- McWhinnie and Mary Odile Cahoon become the first women to overwinter at McMurdo Station.
- Australian women are allowed to travel to the Australian Antarctic Territory (AAT).

1974-1975

- First women civilian contractors on Antarctica were Elena Marty and Jan Boyd.

1975

- Eleanor Honnywill is the first woman to be awarded the Fuchs Medal from the British Antarctic Survey (BAS).
- The House of Representatives in Australia is asked how many women have gone to Antarctica so far: the answer is one.

1975-1976

- Mary Alice McWhinnie is the first woman scientist to work at Palmer Station.
- The first three Australian women to visit the continent of Antarctica in an official capacity -Elizabeth Chipman, Jutta Hösel and Shelagh Robinson visit Casey station for the summer.

1976

- Dr Zoe Gardner becomes the first woman to winter with the Australian Antarctic Program as a medical officer on sub-Antarctic Macquarie Island.

1977

- Meher Moos becomes the first Indian woman to visit Antarctica.

1978

- Silvia Morello de Palma of Argentina is the first woman to give birth on Antarctica on January 7.
- Margaret Winslow of the United States is the first woman to lead an expedition to Livingston Island, Antarctica

1979

- First year the United States Navy advertises for "qualified female volunteers to over-winter in Antarctica."

1978-1979

- Michele Eileen Raney is the first woman physician to work year-round on Antarctica. She was also the first woman to winter at the South Pole.

== 1980s ==
1981

- Dr Louise Holliday is the first woman to winter in Antarctica for the Australian Antarctic Program serving as medical officer at Davis station.

1983

- First British woman, Janet Thomson, joins the British Antarctic Survey, and becomes the first British woman on Antarctica.
- On November 16, American Brooke Knapp, is the first person to land at McMurdo Station for a round the world flight and the first person to pilot a business jet over both the North and South Poles.
- Geologist Sudipta Sengupta and Aditi Pant, a marine biologist are the first women scientists from India to take part in Antarctic Expedition.

1984

- Josefina Castellví is the first Spanish woman to participate in and coordinate an international expedition to Antarctica.

1985

- First woman married at the South Pole is Patricia Manglicmot to Randall Chambers.
- The first women to winter-over at Palmer Station were Ann Wylette and Becky Heimark.
- Thea de Moel is the first Dutch woman to reach Antarctica as a crew member aboard the 'Footsteps of Scott Expedition' ship Southern Quest.

1986

- The first Polar Medal is awarded to a woman, Virginia Fiennes, who was honored for her work in the Transglobe Expedition.
- Ann Peoples became the manager of the Berg Field Center in 1986, becoming the first U.S. woman to serve in a "significant leadership role."

1987

- Elizabeth Chipman publishes Women on the Ice: A History of Women in the Far South.

1988

- American Lisa Densmore is the first woman to summit Mount Vinson.

1987-1988

- First South African women to over-winter at Marion Island were Marianna Steenkamp and Marieta Cawood.

1988-1989

- Alison J. Clifton commands the Macquarie Island station, becoming the first woman to lead a sub-Antarctic base.

1989

- Victoria E. Murden and Shirley Metz are the first women to reach the South Pole by land.
- Denise Allen and Dr Lynn Williams are jointly the first women to be awarded the Australian Antarctic Medal.
- Australian, Diana Patterson, head of Mawson station, becomes the first female station leader of an Antarctic base.

1989-1990

- Joan Russell at Casey station and Monika Puskeppeleit at Georg von Neumayer are the first women to simultaneously lead bases on the continent.

== 1990s ==
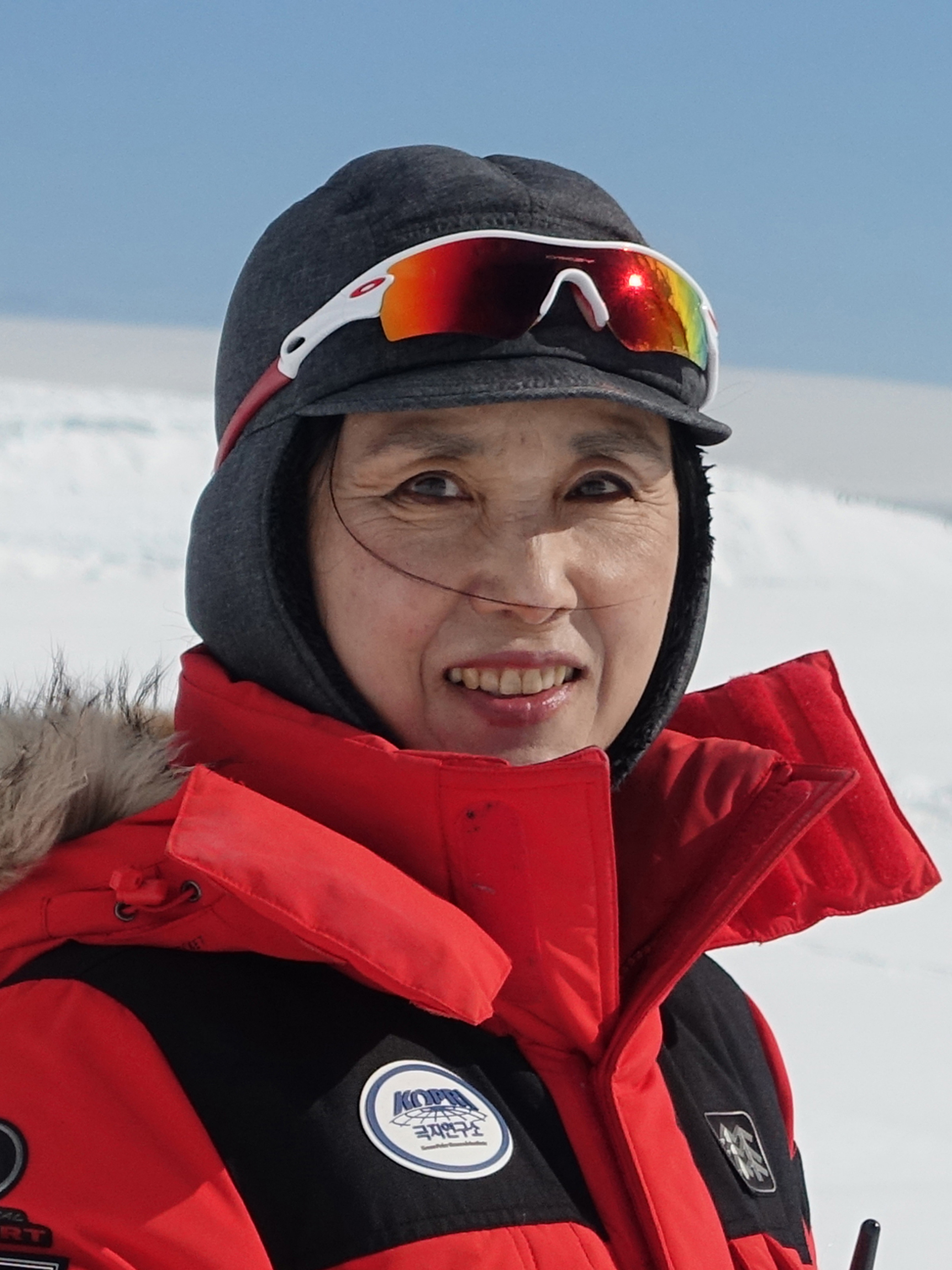
In-Young Ahn at King Sejong Station in 2015; she led this station in 1991

1990-1991

- First all-female over-wintering group spends the winter at Georg von Neumayer, with leader Monika Puskeppeleit.

1991

- In-Young Ahn is the first female leader of an Asian research station (King Sejong Station), and the first South Korean woman to step onto Antarctica.
- Serap Tilav is the first Turkish woman at the South Pole.
- Junko Tabei, who later becomes the first woman to complete the Seven Summits, climbs to the summit of Mount Vinson.

1992

- Judy Chesser Coffman, of the U.S. Navy, was the first female helicopter pilot to fly in Antarctica, in support of the National Science Foundation (NSF).

1993

- Ann Bancroft leads the first all-woman expedition to the South Pole and becomes the first woman to reach both the South and North Pole.

1994

- Liv Arnesen of Norway is the first woman to ski alone to the South Pole.
- Miriam-Rose Ungunmerr-Baumann with Lin Onus become the first Indigenous Australians to visit Antarctica.

1996

- First year that women over-winter at the Halley Research Station.

1996-1997

- Laurence de la Ferrière is the first French woman to cross the Antarctic solo.
- Dr. Aithne Rowseis the first South African woman to overwinter in Antarctica 1997 (see SANAE).

1997-1998

- Four Ukrainian women overwintered in Antarctica at Ukrainian research station Vernadsky Research Base as part of the 2nd country's Antarctic expedition: geophysicist Maryna Orlova, meteorologists Svitlana Krakovska and Lyudmyla Mankivska, and cook Galyna Kolotnytska.

== 2000s ==
2000

- Zhao Ping and Lin Qing are the first Chinese women to over-winter at Antarctica.
- Fiona Thornewill and Catharine Hartley become the first British women to walk to the South Pole on foot.
- Caroline Hamilton and four other women become the first British women to ski to the South Pole as an all-women expedition.

2001

- Ann Bancroft and Liv Arnesen are the first women to ski across Antarctica.

2003

- Lynne Cox swims more than a mile in Antarctic waters.
- US Coast Guard pilot Sidonie Bosin is the first female aviation officer in charge of air crews in the Antarctic.
- Physician Assistant Heidi Lim Rehm spends first winter at Amundsen–Scott South Pole Station. As of 2020 she holds the record for the most winters spent by a woman at the South Pole. She spent five winters total: 2003, 2005, 2006, 2007, and 2008.

2004

- Fiona Thornewill became first British woman to ski solo and unsupported to the South Pole in a record breaking 41 days.
- Linda Beilharz is the first Australian woman to ski to the South Pole.
- Jackie Ronne publishes her memoirs about her year in Antarctica called Antarctica's First Lady: Memoirs of the First American Woman to Set Foot on the Antarctic Continent and Winter-Over as a Member of a Pioneering Expedition.

2005

- Merieme Chadid is the first Moroccan woman on Antarctica.
- Loretta Feris is the first black South African woman to work as a principal investigator for an Antarctic project.

2006

- Hannah McKeand sets coast-to-pole solo/unsupported record of 39 days, 9 hours and 33 minutes.
- Bettine van Vuuren of South Africa is the first female scientist Chief Scientist in the South African National Antarctic Programme's annual relief voyage in 2006.

2007

- Clare O'Leary is the first Irish woman to reach the South Pole.
- Sarah Ames of Germany is the first woman to complete a marathon on all seven continents.

2008

- Sumiyo Tsuzuki is the first Japanese woman to reach the South Pole.

2009

- On December 30, several women, as part of the Kaspersky Commonwealth Antarctic Expedition, reached the South Pole by ski and set records for their countries. Sophia Pang becomes the first Singaporean woman to reach the South Pole. Reena Kaushal Dharmshaktu becomes the first Indian woman to ski to the pole. Stephanie Solomonides became the first person from Cyprus to reach the pole.

== 2010s ==
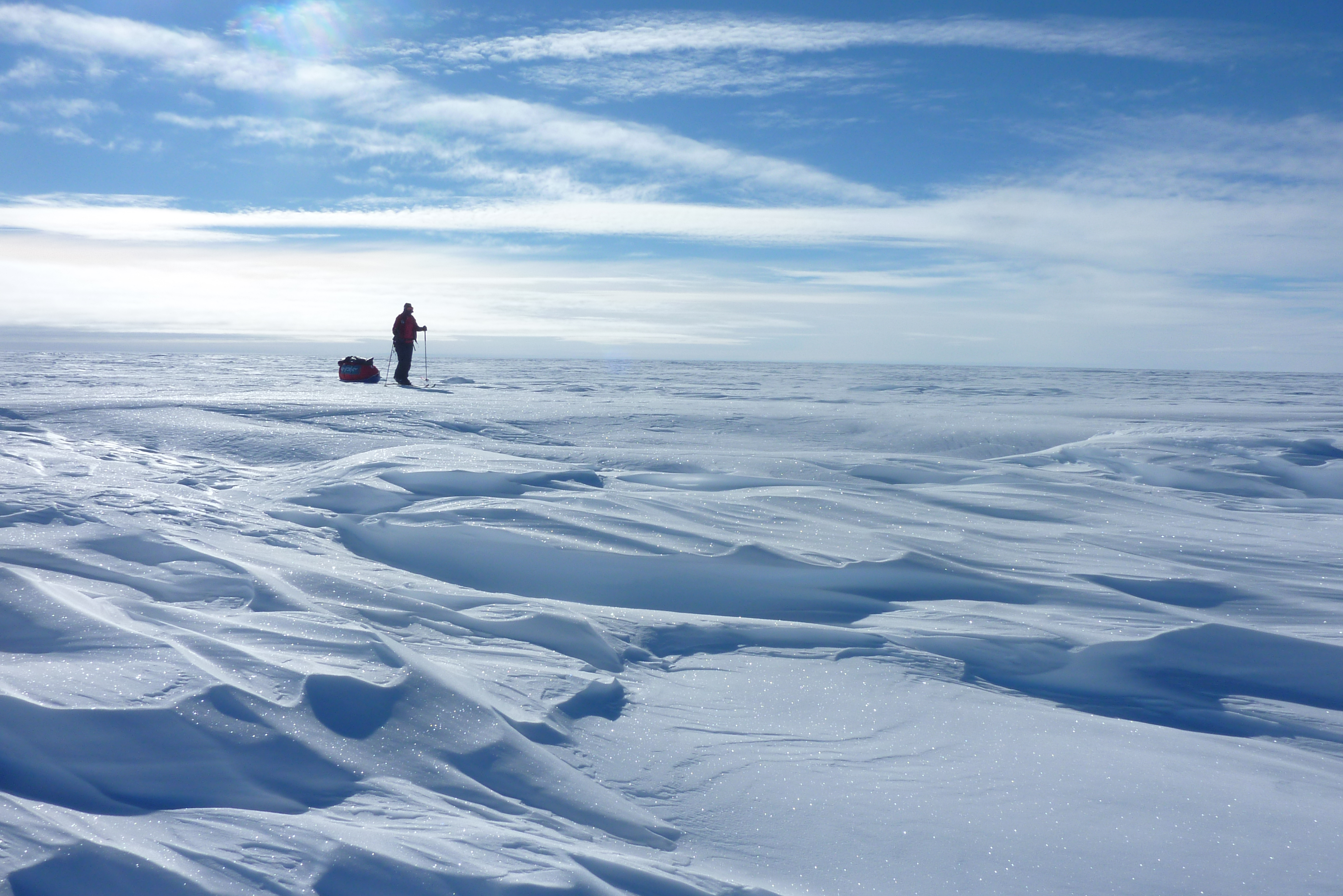
Felicity Ashton in Antarctica

2010

- Meagan McGrath becomes the first Canadian to ski solo, unassisted and unsupported, to the South Pole.
- First woman from Kuwait on Antarctica is Maryam al-Joan.
- First African-American woman to reach the South Pole is Barbara Hillary on January 6. She is also the first African-American woman to have been to both poles.

2012

- Felicity Ashton of the United Kingdom is the first person to ski alone across Antarctica, using only her own muscle power. She is also the first woman to cross Antarctica alone.
- The first woman to climb Mount Sidley was sixteen-year-old Romanian Crina Coco Popescu.
- Zeena Al Towayya is the first Omani woman, and Sahar Al Shamrani is the first Saudi woman to travel to Antarctica.

2014

- On December 23, the Seven Summits Women Team becomes the first group of Nepali women to climb the Seven Summits when they reach the top of Mount Vinson.

2013

- On December 27, Maria Leijerstam from the United Kingdom became the first person in the world to cycle to the South Pole from the edge of the Antarctic Continent.

2016

- First large (78 member) all-women expedition, Homeward Bound, goes to Antarctica.

2018

- On January 8, Feng Jing, aged 36, became the first Chinese woman to reach the South Pole by skis.
- Linda (Marie) Eketoft, a lawyer and writer from Sweden, became the first woman to Heliski, ski off a helicopter, in Antarctica on 14 December 2018.

2019

- On December 9, Tynthia (Tia) King became the second African American to reach the South Pole.

== 2020s ==
=== 2020 ===
- On January 25, Feng Jing, aged 38, became the first person to ever reach the Antarctic Pole of Inaccessibility by foot, travelling over 1,800 kilometers.
- Anja Blacha set the record for the longest solo, unsupported, and unassisted polar expedition by a woman.

=== 2022 ===
- Preet Chandi became the first woman of color to reach the South Pole solo and unsupported when she completed a solo expedition across Antarctica to the South Pole, finishing on 3 January 2022.

== See also ==
- Arctic exploration
- European and American voyages of scientific exploration
- Farthest South
- History of Antarctica
- List of polar explorers
- Women in Antarctica
- List of Antarctic women
