= Aithne Rowse =

First South African women to over-winter in Antarctica

- Born: 1968 (age 57–58); Johannesburg, South Africa
- Education: University of the Witwatersrand
- Occupation: Physician
- Known for: First South African woman to over-winter in Antarctica (1997); First woman selected for a SANAE team
- Medical career
- Field: Medicine; Anesthesiology
- Institutions: Chris Hani Baragwanath Hospital

Aithne Rowse (born 1968?) is an anaesthetist who was the first South African woman to over-winter in Antarctica.

== Biography ==
Rowse grew up in Johannesburg and studied for a degree at Wits University Medical School. She worked at Johannesburg Hospital and as an anaesthetist at Chris Hani Baragwanath Hospital in Diepkloof. She has recommended better practice in tourniquet technique.

=== Antarctica ===
In 1979, American Michele Eileen Raney was the first woman doctor to be in Antarctica all year when she spent the winter at the South Pole.

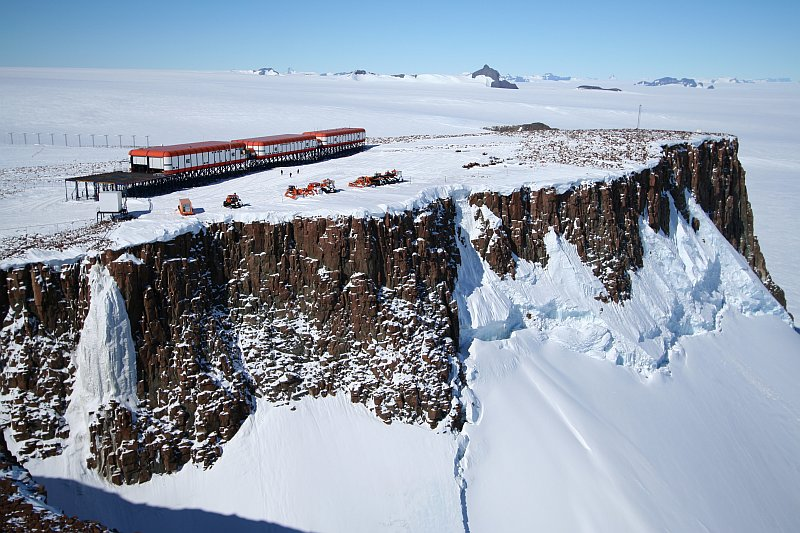
SANAE IV from above the northern buttress

Rowse was the first South African woman to over-winter in Antarctica in 1997 when she was aged 29. She was also the first woman to be selected to join any SANAE team. She was part of a team of ten who were the first group to spend the winter on the South African base SANAE IV. Rowse was doctor for the team and her preparation for the job meant that she undertook a range of courses to make her familiar with every aspect of emergency medicine. Prior to arrival, Rowse had not met any of the members of the team for that year. Afterwards, Rowse married fellow team member Hein de Beer.
