= María Adela Caría =

Argentine bacteriologist

María Adela Caría (12 February 1912 – 1987) was an Argentine bacteriologist, head of microbiology at the Argentine Museum of Natural Sciences, and a CONICET researcher. She was part of the group of scientists known as the "Four of Melchior" who participated in the first fieldwork in Antarctica. Because of her work in Antarctica, a cape bears her name: Cape Caría. She was born in La Plata.

== Career ==
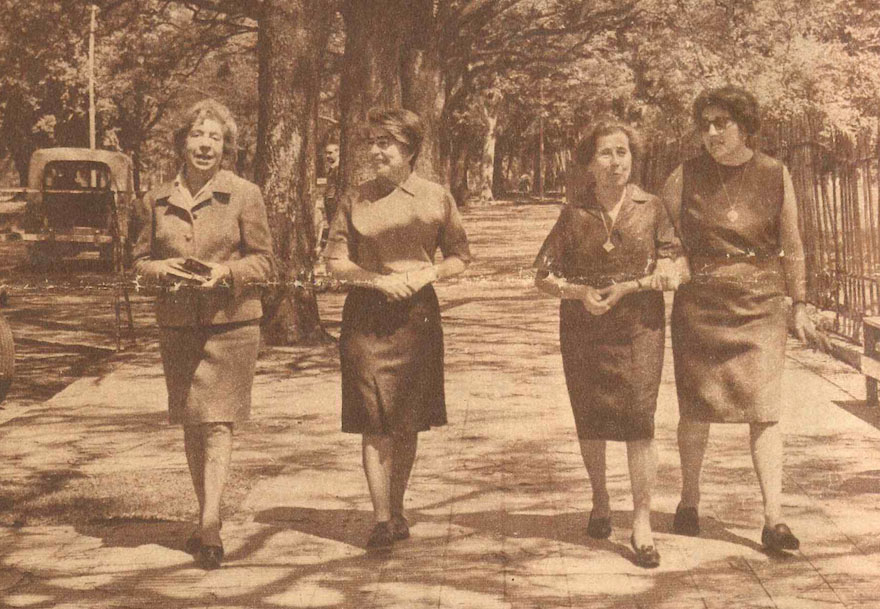
Irene Bernasconi, Maria Adela Caria, Elena Martinez Fontes and Carmen Pujals

She was part of the team of four that worked at Bernardino Rivadavia Argentine Museum of Natural Sciences, and they were invited to be a part of that year's expedition. In November 1968, Caría participated in the expedition to Antarctica together with Elena Martínez Fontes, Irene Bernasconi and Carmen Pujal. After embarking on the ARA Bahía Aguirre, it was transferred to the Melchior Base, where they worked during the summer collecting specimens from Antarctica. During the expedition they travelled a thousand kilometres by boat around Antarctica, making landings to take samples. Her research contributed to the knowledge of marine algae, siliceous sponges, starfish, sea urchins and other invertebrates, as well as to the understanding of environmental microbiology.
