= Diana Patterson =

First woman in charge of an Australian Antarctic Station

Diana Patterson OAM (born c.1951) was the first woman to be in charge of an Australian Antarctic Station.

== Career ==
Patterson originally trained as a physical education teacher. She had to persevere to join the Antarctic team. She applied four times before she was accepted. She first went to the Antarctic in 1987. By this time only ten Australian women had spent a winter there. She first worked at Casey Station which is one of three operated by Australia. She was in charge of Mawson Station for a year and she became the first woman to lead an Australian Antarctic Station.

After she retired Patterson would guide Antarctic tourists including a visit to Mawson Station. Twenty years after her leadership, Patterson took the hint of tourists who told her she should write a book. She shared a cabin on a trip with a person who ensured that she started, The Ice Beneath My Feet: My Year In Antarctica. The book was published in 2012 by HarperCollins.

Patterson was awarded the Medal of the Order of Australia in the 2013 Australia Day Honours for "service to conservation and the environment".

In 2019 Patterson graduated from Monash University with a PhD, for her thesis titled "Humans and canines on the frozen continent: An examination of the relationship between explorers of the heroic era of Antarctica and their sledge dogs".
