= Elizabeth Chipman =

Australian writer, administrator and Antarctic pioneer

Elizabeth Chipman (born 1934) is an Australian writer, administrator and Antarctic pioneer. In 1975–76, she was one of the first Australian women to set foot on the Antarctic mainland.

From 1954 to 1977, Chipman was with the Australian Antarctic Division, Melbourne where she worked as a typist, information officer and scientific administrator. During the summers of 1966–67, 1971–72 and 1975–76, she visited Macquarie Island with the Australian National Antarctic Research Expeditions (ANARE). In 1975, she was assigned to the Antarctic mainland where she worked as an information officer. She was accompanied by two other women: the photographer Jutta Hösel and Shelagh Robinson, a welfare officer. She was the first woman member of the ANARE Club.

Chipman chronicled all of the women to travel to Antarctica up to 1984. She took pains to find the names of all the women who had ever been to or even near Antarctica and eventually donated 19 folio boxes of her research to the National Library of Australia.

== Publications ==
- Elizabeth Chipman (1978). Australians in the frozen south: living & working in Antarctica. T. Nelson. ISBN 978-0-17-005260-3.
- Elizabeth Chipman (1986). Women on the Ice: A History of Women in the Far South. Melbourne University Press. ISBN 978-0-522-84324-8.
