= Patricia Hepinstall and Ruth Kelley =

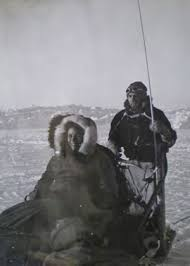
Patricia Hepinstall at the McMurdo Station

The first women to fly to Antarctica were the American flight attendants Patricia (Pat) Hepinstall of Holyoke, Colorado, U.S. and Ruth Kelley of Houston, Texas, U.S. who were members of the crew on the Pan American flight which landed at the US McMurdo Station on October 15, 1957.

The two women joined the flight in Christchurch, New Zealand, on the last leg of the flight from San Francisco. They received a warm welcome at the base despite misgivings by Rear-Adminal Dufek who had called for an all-male crew. The matter was however outside his jurisdiction. Although some of the station's over-wintering staff avoided meeting the women after so many months, some 50 others took part in celebrations which included a beard contest and a US versus New Zealand sled race. New Zealanders from the nearby Scott Base were also invited to attend. The PanAm pilot, Ralph Savory, referred to the flight attendants as "very nice looking stewardesses".
