= Elena Martinez Fontes =

Argentine marine biologist and Antarctic scientist

Elena Martínez Fontes
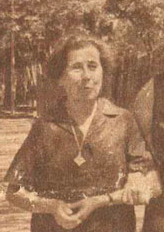
- Born: January 12, 1915; Buenos Aires, Argentina
- Died: May 4, 1989 (aged 74)
- Other name: Elena Dolores Martínez Fontes
- Occupations: Biologist, marine invertebrate specialist
- Known for: The Four of Melchior

Elena Martínez Fontes (Buenos Aires, 12 January 1915 – 4 May 1989) was an Argentine biologist who specialized in marine invertebrates. She is known for being one of four scientists called the "Four of Melchior" (Las Cuatro de Melchior) referring to the Argentinean temporary base in Antarctica. She was there In November 1968 with the Argentineans Irene Bernasconi, a specialist in echinoderms, the bacteriologist María Adela Caría and the specialist in marine algae, Carmen Pujals. They were the first female Argentine scientists to carry out fieldwork in Antarctica. principales logrós

== Life and work ==
Fontes was born in Buenos Aires, Argentina. She studied at the Instituto Nacional Superior "Joaquín V. González," graduating in 1933 as a National Normal Teacher and then, in 1938, as a secondary school teacher in natural sciences. She went on to become a "Supernumerary Assistant" for the preparation and classification of material from the Protistology laboratory of the Argentine Museum of Natural Sciences. In 1947, she moved to the Marine Invertebrates Section of the museum. After several training trips and collecting numerous samples, in 1973 she took over as head of the section. In 1960 she entered the scientific research career at CONICET.

In addition to her disciplinary research, she also continued teaching. In 1956 she was appointed professor of the Chair of Zoology and Anatomy at the National School of Commerce No. 16. At the request of the Rockefeller Foundation, she participated in the preparation of biology material. In 1964, she participated in the First Inter-American Conference on the Teaching of Biology. She also published, in 1970, a two-volume book on the teaching of the discipline, entitled Biology: its modern teaching, together with Edgardo del Ponte. She remained active until 1978 when she requested her resignation from the Museum of Natural Sciences. In 1979 she was granted her retirement benefit.

=== Antarctica mission ===
In 1968, together with three other biologists, Fontes carried out fieldwork in the Argentine Antarctica region. At the age of 53, she traveled to Antarctica aboard the ship ARA Bahía Aguirre. On that trip, "the four of Melchior" traveled 1,000 kilometers of coastline by boat collecting samples, in a campaign that took two and a half months. They installed nets in depths of up to 180 meters to collect specimens of organisms. They collected water and soil samples of various species of marine flora and fauna, including more than 2,000 specimens of echinoderms. From their work, they were able to identify the brown alga Cystosphaera jacquinotii. Their collection of Antarctic marine algae is currently part of the Herbarium of the Bernardino Rivadavia Natural Sciences Argentine Museum.

=== Distinctions ===
In 1969 the "Embassy of Women of America" awarded a commemorative medal to each member of the Expedition for being "the first female group that participated in an Antarctic Campaign to develop scientific tasks."

Together with her companions, Fontes received numerous posthumous awards. In 2018, to commemorate the 50th anniversary of the campaign that took the four Argentine scientists to Antarctica to carry out fieldwork, at the proposal of the Argentine Foreign Ministry, the Argentine Antarctic Institute and the National Antarctic Directorate, the four scientists were each honored with an Antarctic place name approved by the Naval Hydrography Service: Ensenada Pujals, Cabo Caría, Cabo Fontes and Ensenada Bernasconi. All four sites are located at the southeastern end of the Jason Peninsula in the Weddell Sea.

In that same year, the Argentine Post Office issued a commemorative stamp with a photograph of the four scientists.

On February 11, 2022, on the International Day of Women and Girls in Science, President Alberto Fernández led an act in which the Hall of Scientists of the Casa Rosada (seat of the executive power of the Argentine Republic) it was renamed as the Argentine Science Hall, making "the four of Melchior" part of the honored female figures.

A photograph of Fontes was added to the gallery of images of the Hall together with those of 10 other women of science from Argentina: Elisa Bachofen, Eugenia Sacerdote de Lustig, Rebeca Guber, Sara Rietti, Elvira López, Telma Reca, Hetty Ladis Regina Bertoldi de Pomar, Irene Bernasconi, María Adela Caría and Carmen Pujals.
