= Louise Seguin =

French explorer

Louise Seguin (also known as Marie-Louise Seguin) was one of the first women to travel to the Antarctic region. Beginning at the age of around 14-16 (accounts vary), she disguised herself as a boy in order to travel on the 1772–1773 voyage of Yves-Joseph de Kerguelen. It has been suggested that she and Kerguelen were lovers, or that she was his mistress. During the voyage she was often referred to by the nickname Louison. She explored the Kerguelen Islands with the crew of the Roland, and later her presence was used to discredit Kerguelen.

Eventually, it was discovered that Louise was a woman, and the situation was said to have contributed to his 1776 court-martial.
