= Jennie Darlington =

Canadian explorer

Jennie Darlington (née Zobrist, 1924–2017) was an American explorer and, with Jackie Ronne, one of the first women to overwinter on Antarctica, during the winter of 1947-1948. She and Ronne were part of a team that re-occupied a former U.S. station (from the U.S. Antarctic Service Expedition in 1939) on Stonington Island in 1946. Darlington became part of the expedition by chance: she had intended to only go as far as Valparaiso, Chile with her husband, Harry Darlington, who was the pilot for the Ronne expedition. The newlyweds spent their honeymoon in Antarctica after Jackie Ronne and her husband requested Jennie's presence.

Darlington was also the first woman to become pregnant in Antarctica. She later wrote a book, My Antarctic Honeymoon, in which she concluded that "women do not belong in Antarctica". The book was co-written with Jane McIlvaine and includes the line "Antarctica to me is female. Fickle, changeable, unpredictable, her baseness disguised by a white make-up of pristine purity. Suddenly she strips off her gloves, rolls up her sleeves and with the ferocity of a wolf, springs at your throat." She and Ronne did not get on, although this may have been due to issues between their spouses.
