= Irene Bernasconi =

Argentine marine biologist

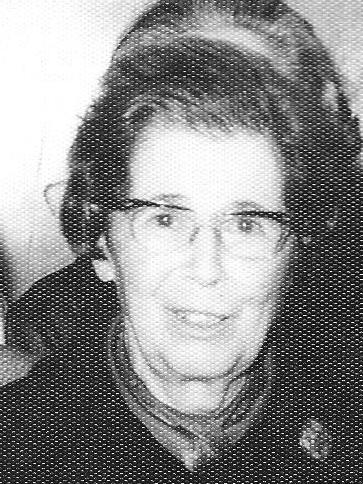
- Born: Irene María Bernasconi; 29 September 1896; La Plata, Argentina
- Died: 7 July 1989 (aged 92); Buenos Aires, Argentina
- Occupation: Marine biologist
- Years active: 1924–1984

Irene María Bernasconi (Spanish pronunciation: [iˈɾene maˈɾia βeɾnasˈkoni]; 29 September 1896 – 7 July 1989) was an Argentine marine biologist specializing in echinoderm research and best known for her work in the Antarctic. She was the first echinoderm specialist in Argentina and spent 55 years conducting research into echinoderms found in the Argentine Sea. Her main focus was sea stars; however, she also conducted research into brittle stars and sea urchins.

== Work ==
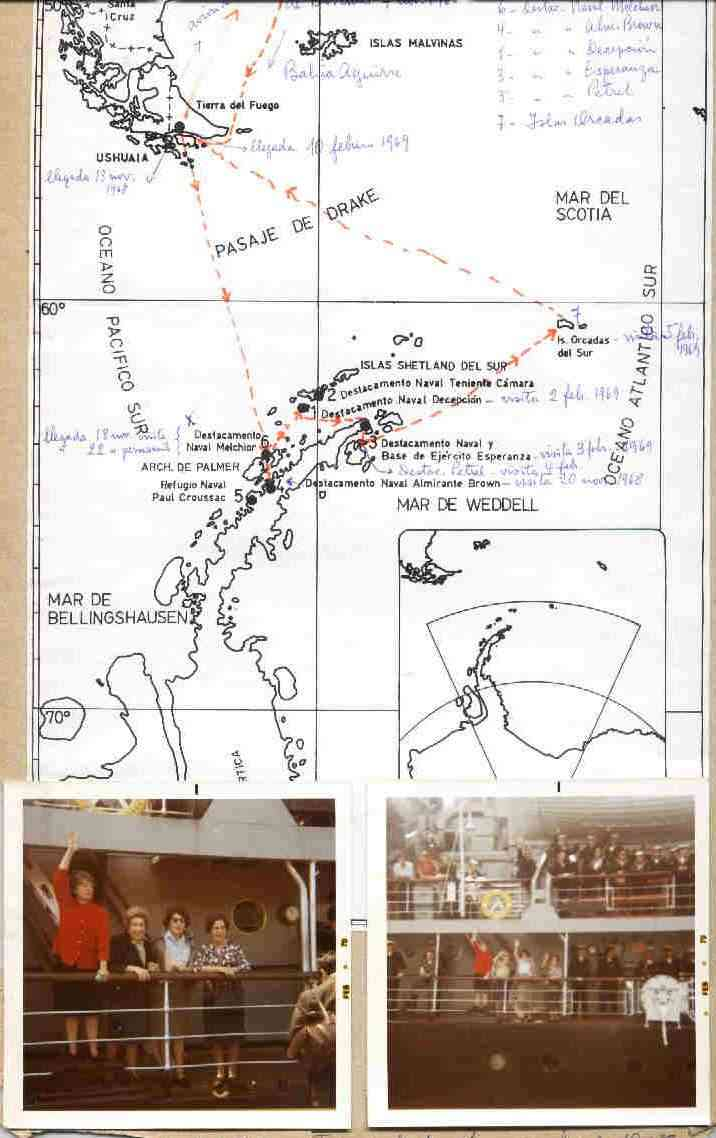
Irene Bernasconi – Voyage to Antarctica 1968 – route

Over the course of her career, Bernasconi described a number of new genera and species. Her first taxonomic publication, in which new species from the genus Pteraster were described, was published in 1935. In 1941 she described two new species from the genus Luidia. Between 1937 and 1980, Bernasconi revised the taxonomy of a number of families: Pterasteridae, Luidiidae, Odontasteridae, Gonisasteridae, Ganeriidae, Asterinidae and Echinasteridae. In 1965 she described the new genus of Vemaster along with four new species.

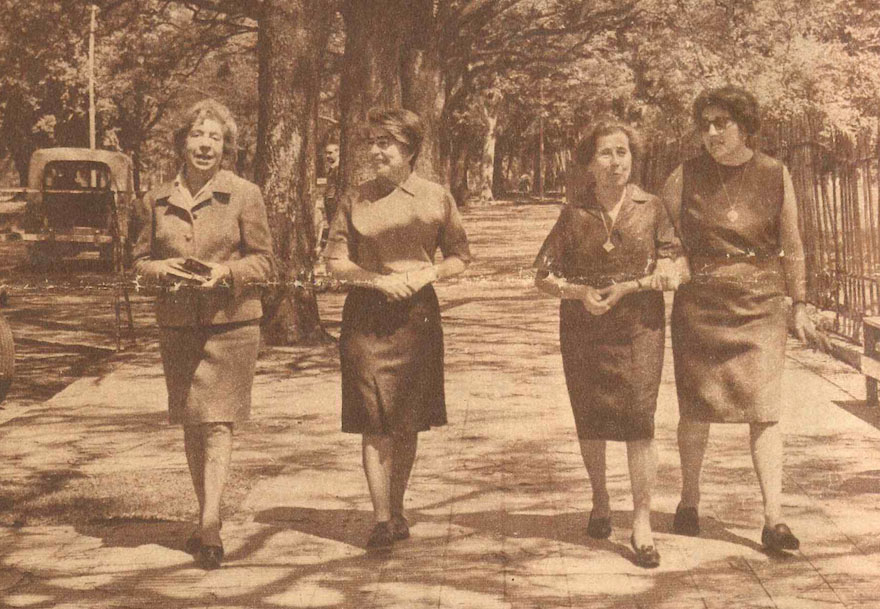
Irene Bernasconi, Maria Adela Caria, Elena Martinez Fontes and Carmen Pujals

Bernasconi was one of the first female Argentine scientists to conduct research in Antarctica after travelling there on 7 November 1968, and the first woman to lead an Antarctic expedition. She was aged 72 at the time. She was accompanied by three other scientists - microbiologist Maria Adela Caria, marine biologist Elena Martinez Fontes and botanist Carmen Pujals. These scientists are known as the "Four of Melchior" due to their association with the Melchior Base Antarctic station they conducted their research and expedition from. They were the first group of female scientists to conduct research in Antarctica.

The four scientists were in Antarctica for two-and-a-half months staying at Melchior Base on Gamma Island. They took water samples and collated examples of both deep sea flora and fauna. The findings also included mud and over 2,000 examples of Bernasconi's specialism of echinoderms.

== Recognition ==
In 1969 the "Embajada de Mujeres de América" (Embassy of Women of America) gave a commemorative medal to each member of the expedition.

The group received numerous posthumous distinctions. When commemorating the 50th anniversary of the campaign, the Argentine Foreign Ministry, the Argentine Antarctic Institute and the National Antarctic Directorate, honored the scientists with four Antarctic place names approved by the Naval Hydrography Service: Pujals Bay, Cape Caría, Cape Fontes and Bernasconi Bay.

On 11 February 2022, on the International Day of Women and Girls in Science, President Alberto Fernández renamed the Hall of Scientists of the Casa Rosada as the Argentine Science Hall, with "the Four of Melchior" included in a display of honored Argentine women scientists. A photograph of Bernasconi was added to the image gallery of the hall, along with those of 10 other women scientists from Argentina.

She was the Google Doodle on 7 November 2022, which pictures her next to starfish, her main focus.
