= Carmen Pujals =

Argentine botanist

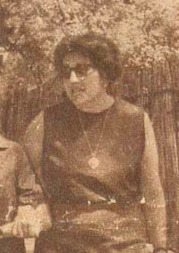
- Born: January 13, 1916; Buenos Aires, Argentina
- Died: October 24, 2003 (aged 87); Adrogué, Argentina
- Occupation: Botanist

Carmen Pujals (January 13, 1916 – October 24, 2003) was an Argentine botanist. She was born in Buenos Aires, Argentina and moved to Barcelona at the age of five. Pujals began studying biology at the University of Barcelona in 1935, but soon after, her father moved the family back to Buenos Aires fearing the start of the Civil War. In 1936 she continued her studies at the University of Buenos Aires and obtained a degree in Natural Sciences.

== Work ==
In 1947 Pujals began working as a researcher in the marine phycology laboratories at the Bernardino Rivadavia Natural Sciences Museum where she worked for 52 years.

Pujals was part of a group of four women scientists from Argentina to travel to Antarctica in November 1968. She, along with marine biologist Irene Bernasconi, microbiologist Maria Adela Caria and marine biologist Elena Martinez Fontes, were the first women from Argentina to travel to the continent. During her stay she studied the flora along the Palmer Archipelago and collected Antarctic marine algae that are preserved at the Bernardino Rivadavia Natural Sciences Museum. She made a second trip to Antarctica in 1971. In 1971 Pujals also spent a month collecting seaweed specimens on the Falkland Islands at the request of the British Embassy.

During her career, Pujals described two new genera Medeolthamnion and Camontagne.

The standard author abbreviation Pujals is used to indicate this person as the author when citing a botanical name.
