= List of Antarctic women =

This is a list of Antarctic women. It includes explorers, researchers, educators, administrators and adventurers. They are arranged by the country of their latest citizenship rather than by country of birth.

== Argentina ==
- Viviana Alder (born 1957), marine microbiologist
- Irene Bernasconi (1896–1989), echinoderm specialist, member of the first team of Argentine scientists to work on Antarctica in 1968
- Patricia Ortúzar (graduated 2001), geographer, writer
- Carmen Pujals (1916–2003), botanist, member of the first team of Argentine scientists to work on Antarctica in 1968
- Irene Schloss (PhD 1997), plankton biologist

== Australia ==
- Nerilie Abram (born 1977), climate change environmentalist
- Leanne Armand (born 1968), marine scientist, diatom ecologist
- Dana Bergstrom (born 1962), ecologist, biosecurity specialist, writer
- Hope Black (born 1919), marine biologist, educator, early sub-Antarctic researcher
- Elizabeth Chipman (born 1934), writer, one of the first Australian women to set foot on the Antarctic mainland in 1975
- Louise Crossley (1942–2015), South-African born environmentalist, station leader
- Amanda Davies, geographer
- Gwen Fenton (PhD 1985), biologist, first woman to be chief scientist of the Australian Antarctic Division
- Samantha Hall (born 1982), environmental researcher
- Catherine King (graduated 1992), environmentalist specializing in ecotoxicology research
- Delphine Lannuzel (graduated 2001), Belgian-born biogeochemist, educator
- Nel Law (1914–1990), artist, writer, first Australian woman to set foot in Antarctica in 1961
- Diana Patterson (born early 1950s), first woman to head an Australian Antarctic station
- Sally Poncet (born 1954), biologist, ornithologist, explorer
- Anya Marie Reading (PhD 1997), seismology and computational methods
- Patricia Margaret Selkirk (born 1942), plant biologist, ecologist
- Justine Shaw (graduated 1996), ecologist, conservation scientist
- Jan Strugnell (born 1976), evolutionary molecular biologist
- Elizabeth Truswell (born 1941), palynologist, visual artist
- Miriam-Rose Ungunmerr-Baumann (born 1950), one of the first two indigenous Australians to visit Antarctica
- Barbara Wienecke (PhD 1993), Namibian-born seabird ecologist
- Nerida Wilson (graduated 1998), invertebrate marine biologist
- Elizabeth Leane (DPhil Oxon, Rhodes Scholar), Professor of Antarctic Studies at The University of Tasmania, Australian Antarctic Arts Fellow (2004), co-lead Public Engagement with Antarctic Research Action Group as part of SCAR

== Belgium ==
- Annick Wilmotte (graduated 1982), microbiologist

== Brazil ==
- Edith Fanta (1943–2008), biologist, Antarctic fish researcher
- Vivian Pellizari (graduated 1992), microbiologist
- Venisse Schossler (graduated 2004), climatologist

== Brunei ==
- Dk Najibah Era Al-Sufri (born 1983), first Bruneian to reach the South Pole

== Bulgaria ==
- Roumiana Metcheva (born 1950), ecotoxicologist

== Canada ==
- Josée Auclair (born 1962), polar explorer, first Canadian woman to have headed expeditions to the North and South Poles
- Kathleen Conlan (born 1950), marine biologist, explorer
- Jennie Darlington (1919–2009), explorer, one of the first women to overwinter in Antarctica in 1947–48

== Chile ==
- Veronica Vallejos (born late 1960s), marine biologist, conservationist

== China ==
- Yan Liu (graduated 2003), iceberg calving specialist, environmentalist
- Lijie Wei (born 1974), paleontologist, stratigraphist

== Czech Republic ==
- Linda Nedbalova (born 1976), biologist, writer

== Denmark ==
- Dorthe Dahl-Jensen (born 1958), geophysicist, ice and climate researcher
- Caroline Mikkelsen (1906 - late 1990s), explorer, first woman to set foot on Antarctica or an Antarctic island in 1935

== France ==
- Laurence de la Ferrière (born 1957), Moroccan-born climber and explorer, first French woman to reach the South Pole alone in 1997
- Catherine Ritz (graduated 1975), geographer, climatologist

== Germany ==
- Doris Abele (graduated 1984), marine biologist
- Nancy Bertler (graduated 1996), geologist, ice core researcher
- Anja Blacha (born 1990), expeditioner, longest solo, unsupported, unassisted polar expedition by a woman
- Angelika Brandt (born 1961), deep-sea biologist
- Katrin Linse (PhD 2000), marine benthic biologist
- Karin Lochte (born 1952), oceanographer, climate change specialist
- Cornelia Lüdecke (born 1954), meteorologist, writer
- Bettina Meyer (PhD 1996), marine biologist
- Monika Puskeppeleit (born 1955), physician, station leader of the first all-woman team to overwinter in Antarctica

== India ==
- Reena Kaushal Dharmshaktu, first Indian woman to ski to the South Pole
- Aditi Pant, oceanographer, first Indian woman to visit Antarctica in 1983
- Sudipta Sengupta, structural geologist, mountaineer, visited in 1983
- Meenakshi Wadhwa, cosmochemist, geologist, visited in 1992 and 2012 under ANSMET programs
- Nitya Pandey, physicist and astronomer, visited in 2021 INACH program

== Italy ==
- Cinzia Verde (graduated 1987), biologist, writer

== Japan ==
- Junko Tabei (born 1939), mountaineer, the first woman to climb to the top of Mount Vinson, Antarctica's highest mountain

== Malaysia ==
- Siti Aisyah Alias (born 1966), marine biologist

== Morocco ==
- Merieme Chadid (born 1969), astronomer

== Netherlands ==
- Corina Brussaard (PhD 1997), viral ecologist
- Anita Buma (graduated 1984), marine ecophysiologist
- Monique de Vries (born 1947), politician, polar research supporter

== New Zealand ==
- Rosemary Askin, geologist, palynologist
- Nancy Bertler, climate scientist and ice core specialist
- Margaret Bradshaw, British-born New Zealand geologist
- Ann Chapman (1937–2009), limnologist, first woman to lead an Antarctic expedition
- Marie Darby, marine biologist and teacher, first New Zealand woman to visit the Antarctic mainland
- Edith Farkas (1921–1993), Hungarian-born meteorologist, ozone researcher
- Roberta Farrell, American-born biologist, educator
- Christina Hulbe, glaciologist
- Pat Langhorne, sea ice physicist
- Victoria Metcalf, marine biologist, educator
- Christina Riesselman, paleoceanographer
- Natalie Robinson, polar oceanographer
- Gillian Wratt, botanist, first woman director of the New Zealand Antarctic Programme
- Pamela Young, first New Zealand woman to live and work in Antarctica

== Norway ==
- Liv Arnesen (born 1953), educator, cross-country skier, first woman to ski alone to the South Pole in 1994
- Ingrid Christensen (1891–1976), early polar explorer, first woman to land on the Antarctic mainland or at least view land in Antarctica (1931)
- Karen Kyllesø (born 2003), youngest person to ski solo and unassisted to the South Pole in January, 2025
- Lillemor Rachlew (1902–1983), one of the first women to set foot on the Antarctic mainland in 1937
- Cecilie Skog (born 1974), nurse, explorer, adventurer
- Monica Kristensen Solås (born 1950), glaciologist, meteorologist, explorer

== Pakistan ==
- Namira Salim (born 1975), explorer, artist

== Poland ==
- Maria Olech (born 1941), biologist, lichenologist

== Romania ==
- Florica Topârceanu (born 1954), biologist, medical researcher

== Russia/Soviet Union ==
- Maria Klenova (1898–1976), marine geologist, first woman to undertake scientific work in Antarctica in 1956, contributing to the first Soviet Antarctic atlas

== South Africa ==
- Bettine van Vuuren (graduated 1992), zoologist

== South Korea ==
- In-Young Ahn (graduated 1982), benthic ecologist, oceanographer
- Ji Hee Kim (graduated 1991), biologist, environmentalist, writer
- Hong Kum Lee (graduated 1989), marine biotechnologist

== Spain ==
- Susana Agustí (graduated 1982), biological oceanographer
- Josefina Castellví (born 1935), oceanographer, biologist, writer
- Carlota Escutia Dotti (graduated 1982), geologist

== Sweden ==
- Johanna Davidsson (born 1983), adventurer, skied alone from the coast to the South Pole
- Elisabeth Isaksson (graduated 1986), glaciologist, geologist
- Annelie Pompe (born 1981), adventurer, has climbed all seven summits, including Mount Vinson
- Tina Sjögren (born 1959), Czech-born mountaineer, explorer, first woman to complete the Three Poles Challenge in 2002
- Anna Wåhlin (born 1970), physical oceanographer

== Trinidad and Tobago ==
- Marilyn Raphael (PhD 1990), climatologist, educator, writer

== Turkey ==
- Şahika Ercümen (born 1985), freediver
- Burcu Özsoy (born 1976), scientist

== Ukraine ==
- Halyna Kolotnytska (born 1972), cook of the second Ukrainian Antarctic expedition, 1997/98
- Oksana Savenko (born 1981, Kyiv), Ukrainian marine biologist and zoologist, cetacean researcher, staff member of the National Antarctic Scientific Center, participant of the XXIV and XXVI Ukrainian Antarctic expeditions
- Angelika Hanchuk (born 1994, Vinnytsia), Ukrainian meteorologist, synoptician, and climatologist, staff member of the Ukrainian Hydrometeorological Center, participant of the XXVII Ukrainian Antarctic expedition
- Oksana Ivaniga (born 1994), Ukrainian polar researcher, meteorologist and ozonometrist, member of the 27th Ukrainian Antarctic expedition at the National Antarctic Scientific Center “Akademik Vernadsky”
- Anna Soina (born 1982, Kharkiv), Ukrainian scientist, geophysicist, ozonometrist and environmentalist, staff member of the Institute of Radio Astronomy of the National Academy of Sciences of Ukraine, participant of the XXV and XXIX Ukrainian Antarctic expeditions
- Olena Leshchenko (born 1976, Poltava), Ukrainian polar researcher, cook of the 30th Ukrainian Antarctic expedition (2025–2026) at the Akademik Vernadsky Station
- Ivanna Koturbash (born 1996, Kaniv, Cherkasy Oblast, Ukraine), Ukrainian physician and polar researcher, participant of the 29th Ukrainian Antarctic expedition (2024–2025), first female physician in the history of Ukrainian year-round expeditions at the Akademik Vernadsky Station
- Valentyna Harbarchuk (born 1969, Zhytomyr), Ukrainian meteorologist and polar researcher, participant of the 29th Ukrainian Antarctic expedition (2024–2025), head of the Zhytomyr Meteorological Station of the Zhytomyr Regional Center for Hydrometeorology
- Tetiana Bahlai (born 1991, Zdolbuniv), Ukrainian scientist, biologist and pharmacologist, participant of the XXIX Ukrainian Antarctic expedition
- Nataliia Babii, Ukrainian physician, military surgeon and combat medic, participant of the XXIV Ukrainian Antarctic expedition at the Akademik Vernadsky Station
- Svitlana Krakovska, Ukrainian climatologist and meteorologist, senior researcher of the National Antarctic Scientific Center of the Ministry of Education and Science of Ukraine, participant of the Second Ukrainian Antarctic expedition
- Marina Orlova (born 1954), Ukrainian geophysicist, participant of the Second Ukrainian Antarctic expedition (1997–1998), one of the first four Ukrainian women to take part in a year-round wintering at the Akademi
- Liudmyla Mankivska (born 26 July 1957), Ukrainian meteorologist and polar researcher, participant of the Second Ukrainian Antarctic expedition (1997–1998) at the Akademik Vernadsky Station
- Mariia Pavlovska (born 1988), Ukrainian marine microbiologist and ecologist, research fellow of the National Antarctic Scientific Center, participant of seasonal expeditions to the Akademik Vernadsky Station
- Anastasiia Chyhareva (born 1996, Kyiv), Ukrainian meteorologist and climatologist, researcher of the National Antarctic Scientific Center, participant of four seasonal expeditions to the Akademik Vernadsky Station
- Nataliia Shepel, Ukrainian oceanographer of the National Antarctic Scientific Center, participant in Antarctic expeditions, involved in research on ocean current dynamics using Argo floats and CTD measurements aboard the research vessel Noosfera
- Iryna Kozeretska (born 26 June 1964, Yavoriv), Ukrainian geneticist, deputy director for scientific affairs of the National Antarctic Scientific Center

== United Kingdom ==
- Louise Allcock (graduated 1992), marine biologist, editor
- Felicity Aston (born 1977), explorer, climate scientist
- Kim Crosbie (born c.1969), environmentalist, citizen scientist, writer
- Ginny Fiennes (1947–2004), explorer, her Transglobe Expedition team was the first to reach the two poles
- Jane Francis (born 1956), palaeoclimatologist, director of the British Antarctic Survey
- Helen Fricker (graduated 1991), glaciologist, writer
- Rosey Grant, meteorologist
- Karen Heywood (graduated 1983), oceanographer, educator
- Eleanor Honnywill (c.1919–2003), contributor to the British Antarctic Survey, writer
- Joanne Johnson (born 1977), geologist, writer
- Jennifer Lee, specialist in invasion biology
- Hannah McKeand (born 1973), beat the record for solo skiing from the coast to the pole
- Elizabeth Morris (born 1946), glaciologist
- Tavi Murray (PhD 1990), glaciologist
- Pom Oliver (born 1952), explorer, film producer
- Sharon Robinson (born 1961), plant physiologist, climate change biologist
- Jane Rumble, head of the Polar Regions Department, Foreign and Commonwealth Office, since 2007
- Rosie Stancer (born 1960), explorer, adventurer
- Janet Thomson (born 1942), geologist, first British woman to undertake field research in Antarctica
- Fiona Thornewill (born 1966), explorer
- Jemma Wadham (PhD 1998), glacial biogeochemist

== United States ==
- Jenny Baeseman (graduated 1998), civil engineer, environmentalist, geoscientist
- Ann Bancroft (born 1955), writer, educator, adventurer, first woman to complete Arctic and Antarctic expeditions
- Robin Bell (graduated 1980), polar ice specialist
- Mary Odile Cahoon (1929–2011), Benedictine nun, early Antarctic biological researcher
- Kelly Falkner (born 1960), chemical oceanographer, educator
- Patricia Hepinstall, flight attendant, one of the first two women to fly to Antarctica in October 1957
- Barbara Hillary (1931–2019), first African-American woman to reach both poles
- Louise Huffman (born 1951), educator specializing in polar science
- Christina Hulbe (MSc 1994), geologist, educator
- Kelly Jemison, geologist specializing in Antarctic diatoms
- Lois Jones (1935–2000), geochemist, led the first all-woman science team to Antarctica in 1969
- Ruth Kelley, flight attendant, one of the first two women to fly to Antarctica in October 1957
- Amy Leventer (graduated 1982), marine biologist, micropaleontologist
- Diane McKnight (born 1953), environmental engineer, educator, editor
- Mary Alice McWhinnie (1922–1980), biologist, first American woman to head an Antarctic research station
- Jill Mikucki (graduated 1996), microbiologist
- Robyn Millan (graduated 1995), astronomist, physicist, investigating radiation belts
- Tori Murden (born 1963), explorer, first woman to reach the South Pole by land in 1989
- Alison Murray (graduated 1989), microbiologist
- Jerri Nielsen (1952–2009), physician, writer
- Vanessa O'Brien (born 1964), mountain climber, explorer
- Julie Palais (graduated 1974), glaciologist
- Irene C. Peden (1925–2025), electrical engineer, first American scientist to work in the Antarctic interior in 1970
- Ann Peoples (graduated 1979), first American woman to have a management position in Antarctica
- Erin Pettit (born 1971), glaciologist
- Christina Riesselman (graduated 2001), paleoceanographer
- Michelle Rogan-Finnemore (graduated 1981), scientist, legal expert
- Jackie Ronne (1919–2009), explorer, first woman to be a working member of an Antarctic expedition (1947–48)
- Karen Schwall, first female Army officer in Antarctica and first woman to manage McMurdo Station
- Christine Siddoway (born 1961), structural geologist
- Deborah Steinberg (graduated 1987), oceanographer, zooplankton ecologist
- Cristina Takacs-Vesbach (born 1968), microbial ecologist
- Lynne Talley (born 1954), physical oceanographer
- Trista Vick-Majors (graduated early 2000s), microbial ecologist
- Diana Wall (PhD in 1971), environmental scientist and soil ecologist
- Sophie Warny (born 1969), Belgian-born palynologist
- Jane K. Willenbring (born 1977), geomorphologist and professor
- Terry Wilson (born 1954), geologist, tectonics specialist

== See also ==
- Women in Antarctica
- Timeline of women in Antarctica
- List of female explorers and travelers
