= Preet Chandi =

British Army officer, explorer (b. 1988/89)

Preet Chandi MBE
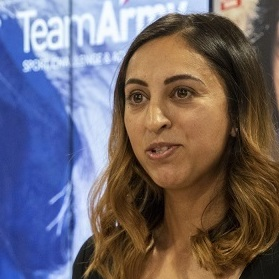
- Chandi at South Pole Expedition launch event, 2021
- Born: Harpreet Chandi; 1988 or 1989 (age 36–37); Derby, England
- Other name: "Polar Preet"
- Occupation: Physiotherapist
- Employer: British Army
- Known for: First woman of colour to complete a solo expedition to the South Pole; longest solo and unsupported polar expedition
- Military career
- Allegiance: United Kingdom
- Branch: British Army
- Service years: 2008–present
- Rank: Captain
- Unit: Royal Army Medical Corps
- Awards: Member of the Most Excellent Order of the British Empire

Harpreet Kaur "Preet" Chandi MBE (born 1988/1989) is a British physiotherapist and British Army officer who completed a solo expedition across Antarctica to the South Pole, finishing on 3 January 2022. In January 2023, she recorded the longest ever solo and unsupported polar expedition.

She was appointed Member of the Most Excellent Order of the British Empire (MBE) in the 2022 Birthday Honours.

== Life ==
Chandi was born in Derby in 1988/1989. She is a Sikh of Indian Punjabi descent. When she was aged 14 she was keen on tennis and left for a tennis school in Surrey; at the age of 16, she was in the Czech Republic, where Jiří Novák ran a tennis school. After losing interest in tennis, Chandi returned to the UK where she completed her education. She took up marathon running when she was eighteen, and also ultra-marathons, initially in the Peak District.

=== Push back ===
Referring to her independent decisions as a youth, followed by the challenges she set for herself as an adult, Chandi has noted that, as a woman of South Asian heritage, she had to deal with "perceptions of rebelliousness and stepping out of line" from both the press and her own ethnic community: "A lot of the time, especially in my community, it's those closest to us who sometimes hold us back, because we're doing something that's out of the norm or something that's different." After an expedition across Greenland in 2020, Chandi said: "I remember somebody saying to me they've never seen an injury like that [frostbite] on somebody of my colour skin before... I am an Asian woman, I'm not the image that people expect to see out there."

== Army career ==
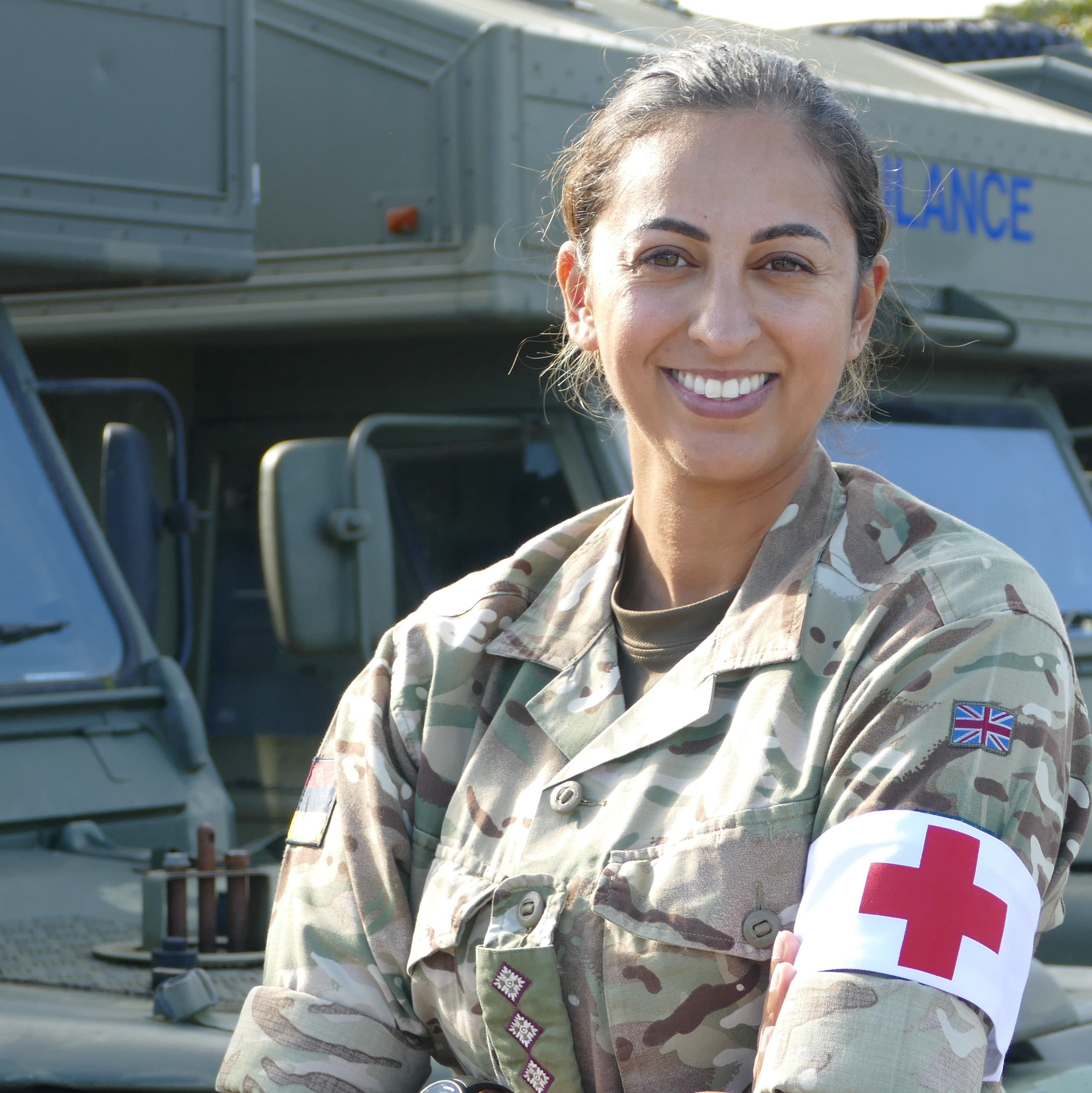
Captain Preet Chandi in 2021

Chandi joined the Territorial Army in 2008 (aged 19 or 20), and then the British Army when she was 27. On 23 March 2013, as a lance corporal, she received a Territorial Army commission as a lieutenant in the Royal Army Medical Corps (RAMC). She was promoted to captain on 15 December 2016 (seniority from 4 August 2016), and serves as a Clinical Training Officer with 3 Medical Regiment. Chandi has served in Nepal, Kenya and South Sudan, where she was deployed on a six-month United Nations peacekeeping tour. In 2017 she participated in the Lanyard Competition, a 40-mile (64 km) endurance event, as part of a team of six with the Royal Signals. In 2019, prior to her South Pole expedition, Chandi completed the Marathon des Sables, a 156-mile (251 km) ultramarathon across the Sahara.

== South Pole expeditions ==
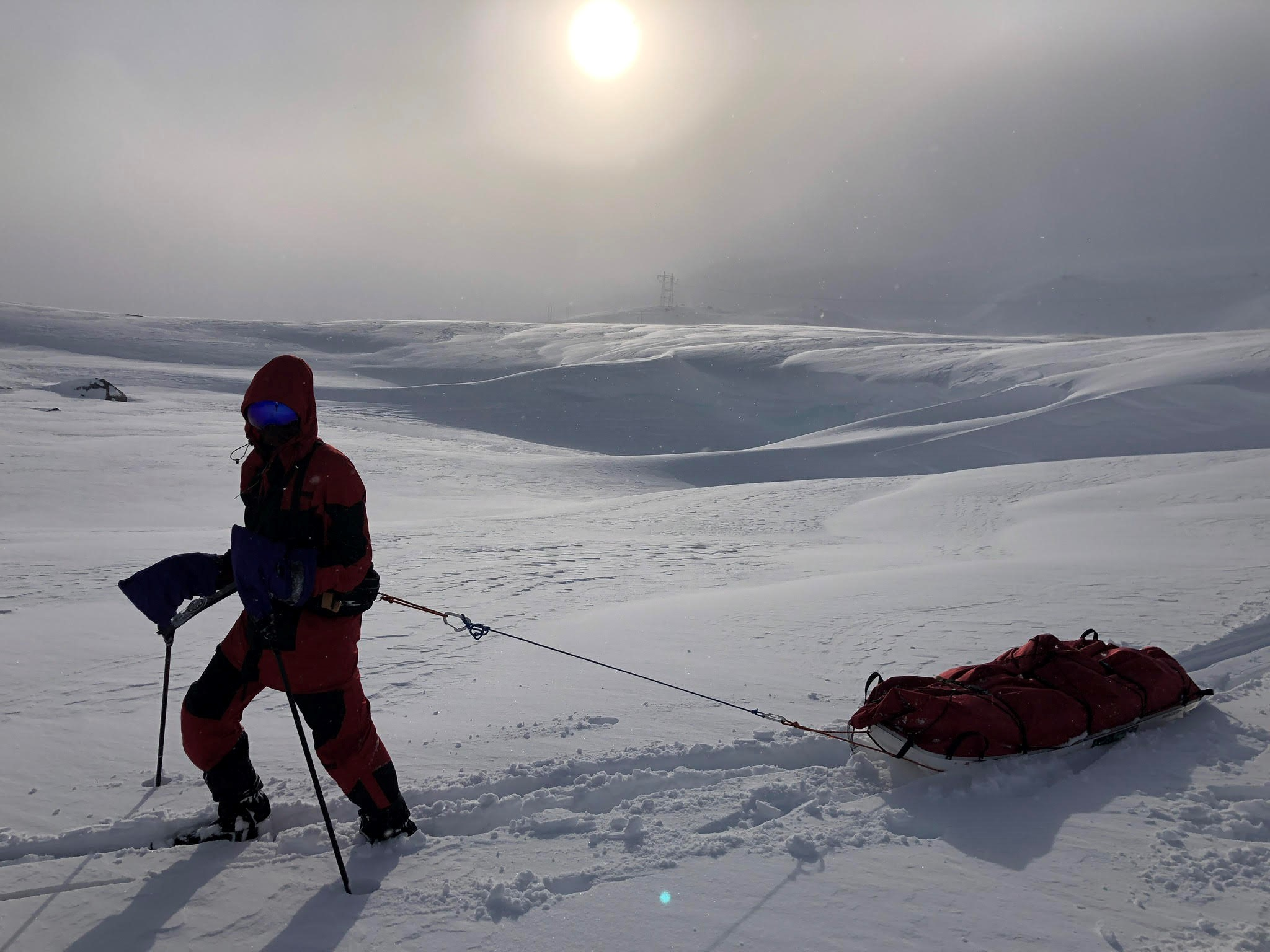
Chandi training in Finse, Norway, in 2021

=== Women in Antarctica ===
The presence of women in Antarctica, let alone women making solo expeditions across the continent, did not occur until more than a century after men first arrived. In 1821, American seal hunter John Davis was thought to be the first man to set foot on Antarctica. It was not until 1935 that the first woman, Danish-Norwegian explorer Caroline Mikkelsen, walked on any part of the Antarctic continent.

It would be another 59 years before Norwegian Liv Arnesen, in 1994, completed a 50-day trek to become the first woman to successfully complete a solo expedition to the South Pole; 27 years later, Chandi would be the first woman of colour to attempt the feat.

=== 2021 expedition ===
Chandi gave public launch to her expedition challenge at The Shard on 21 October 2021, noting she had been training for two years. The event included a statement from Defence Minister Leo Docherty praising "her physical and mental resilience" even in the preparation stages. Her commanding officer, Brigadier Lizzie Faithfull-Davies, Commander 102 Logistics Brigade, called her "inspirational", "talented", "determined" and she said that "the whole brigade wished her the very best".

Chandi set out on her solo expedition on 7 November 2021, departing from Antarctica's Hercules Inlet. The journey to the South Pole involved travelling a distance of 700 miles (1,100 km), pulling a sled weighing 200 pounds (90 kg), carrying 48 days worth of food and supplies.

She documented her journey via voice notes, which she uploaded to her blog. She said after her first week that this would be the longest time in her life that she would be alone. Each day's post was dedicated to those individuals who helped and supported her on her journey, beginning with her late grandfather. She listened to podcasts and music and messages from friends; when just 15 nautical miles (28 km; 17 mi) from the Pole, she posted a voice note asking six of her friends to be her bridesmaids. Upon reaching the South Pole, thinking of the push back she had experienced, Chandi posted that the expedition was a way "to encourage people to push their boundaries and to believe in themselves, ... without being labelled a rebel" and to continue setting your own course when "told to 'just do the normal thing'".

Chandi completed her journey in 40 days, 7 hours and 3 minutes, making her the third fastest solo woman to reach the South Pole unassisted (no snowkiting nor other sail assists), behind Johanna Davidsson of Sweden (38 days, 23 hours and 5 minutes in 2016) and Hannah McKeand from Great Britain (39 days, 9 hours and 33 minutes in 2006). The journey also made her the first woman of color to reach the South Pole solo and unsupported. Felicity Aston was the first person to rely solely on muscle power to complete the challenge, taking 59 days to cross Antarctica, a decade earlier.

=== 2022/23 expedition ===
In November 2022, Chandi set off on her second solo expedition from Hercules Inlet, with the aim of becoming the first woman to cross Antarctica solo and unsupported, hoping to reach Reedy Glacier within 75 days. However, she reported on an online blog on 19 January 2023 that she was about 30 nautical miles (56 km; 35 mi) away from her pick-up point and "pretty gutted" to have missed out on the crossing record. On 20 January 2023, it was announced that Chandi had broken the world record for the longest solo and unsupported polar expedition, having travelled 868 miles (1,397 km) up to that point.

Solo 'fastest' ski expedition 2023

Chandi set off on 26 November to ski solo and on 28 December 2023, she reached the South Pole and declared ( subject to confirmation by Guinness Book of Records ) to be the fastest solo woman skier to complete this route. She was interviewed on Channel 4 News and said she first thought she was a day behind the previous fastest time, but had been told she was actually more than a day ahead of the record.

== Role model ==
After her success, she was congratulated on her "grit and determination" by the British Army's chief of the general staff, Mark Carleton-Smith, while retired major general Lamont Kirkland, CEO of project sponsor Team Army Sports Foundation, noted that Chandi "will undoubtedly become a role model for young people from diverse and ethnic backgrounds to see a world with challenges rather than barriers."

Chandi was appointed a Member of the Order of the British Empire (MBE) in the 2022 Birthday Honours, the Queen's last, with investiture at Windsor Castle performed by the Princess Royal in February 2023. She was given an honorary degree by the University of Derby.

In November 2022, Chandi won Woman of the Year and also the Inspirational Award at the Women in Defence Awards 2022.
