= Linse =

Linse is both a surname and a given name. Notable people with the name include:

Surname:

- Cornelia Linse (born 1959), German rower
- Katrin Linse, German marine biologist
- Pat Linse, American illustrator and skeptic

Given name:

- Linse Kessler (born 1966), Danish adult model, actress and businesswoman

== See also ==
- Lins (disambiguation)
