= Lins =

Lins may refer to:

== People ==
- Cristóvão Lins, German colonizer in Brazil
- Ivan Lins, Brazilian singer and composer
- Luizianne Lins, Brazilian politician
- Heinz Maria Lins, German singer and author
- Norbert Lins (born 1977), German politician
- Paulo Lins, Brazilian writer

== Places ==
- Lins, São Paulo, Brazil

== See also ==
- Linse, a surname and a given name
