= Patricia Ortúzar =

Polar scientist

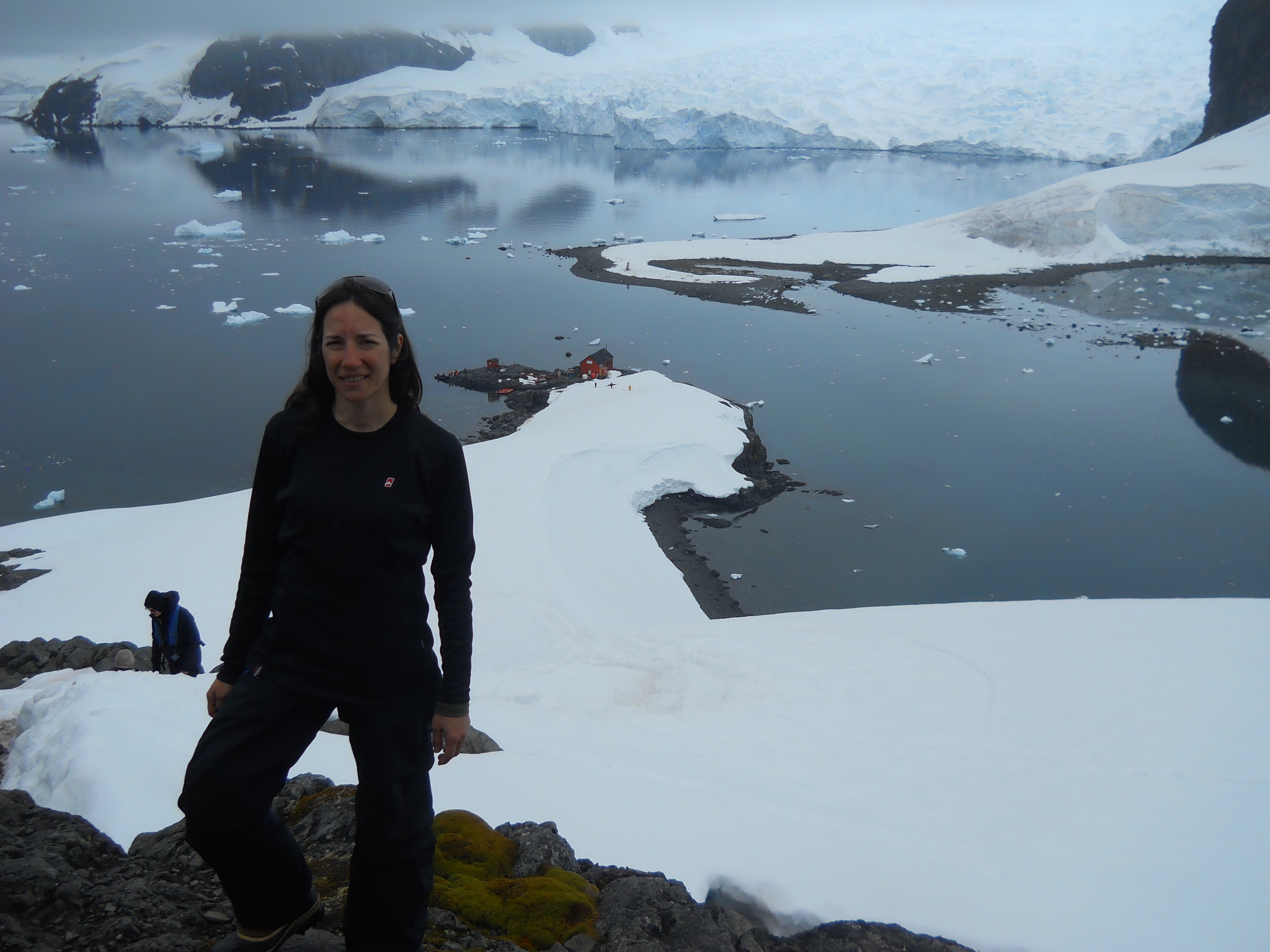
- Patricia Ortúzar at Brown Station
- Education: Universidad de Buenos Aires
- Organization(s): Direccion Nacional del Antartico; Committee for Environmental Protection

Patricia Verónica Ortúzar (Spanish pronunciation: [paˈtɾisja βeˈɾonika oɾˈtusaɾ]; born August 7 1975) is a polar scientist with the Direccion Nacional del Antartico in Argentina. She is the head of the Environment Management and Tourism Program of the Direccion Nacional del Antartico. She is the vice chair of the Committee for Environmental Protection (CEP) within the Antarctic Treaty System.

== Early life and education ==
Ortúzar obtained her degree in Geography from Universidad de Buenos Aires in 2001, during which she had a semester scholarship at University of Liverpool.

== Career and impact ==
Ortúzar works alongside policy makers with matters regarding the protection of the Antarctic environment and the regulation of Antarctic tourism. She implements and enforces these policies within the Argentine Antarctic Program, conducting seminars and education programs for all personnel traveling to Antarctica, evaluating environmental impact assessments and monitoring tourism activities.

Ortúzar represents Argentina in international forums such as Reunion de Administradores de Programas Antarticos Latinoamericanos (RAPAL) which is a meeting of Latin American Managers of Antarctic Programs and Antarctic Treaty Consultative Meetings (ATCM). Ortúzar's contributions to the protection of the Antarctic environment are many, from participating in the Editorial Group for the Antarctic Environments Portal to co-authoring a chapter on the Protection of the Antarctic Environment for the children's education resource titled 'Antartida educa'.

== See also ==
- Argentine Antarctica
