= Louise Allcock =

British researcher

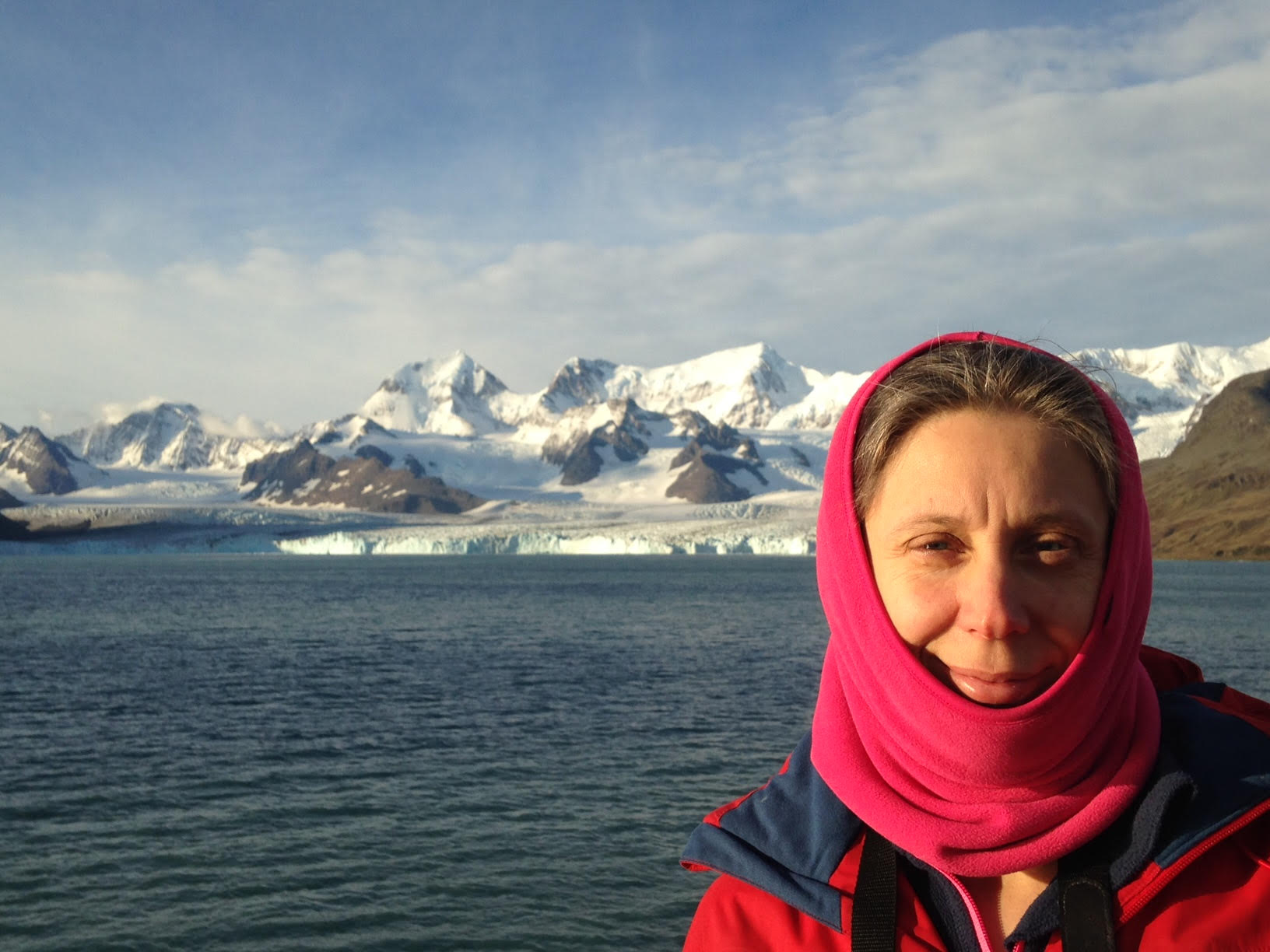
- Allcock aboard the RRS James Clark Ross in South Georgia
- Education: University of Liverpool
- Known for: Editor-in-Chief of the Zoological Journal of the Linnean Society
- Scientific career
- Fields: Cephalopod ecology
- Institutions: University of Galway
- Website: nuigalway.ie/our-research/people/natural-sciences/louiseallcock/

Anne Louise Allcock is a British researcher, best known for her work on ecology and evolution of the cephalopods of the Southern Ocean and deep sea. She is the editor of the Zoological Journal of the Linnean Society.

== Career and impact ==
Allcock is the editor of the Zoological Journal of the Linnean Society and was co-editor of the Journal of Natural History from 2007 to 2015. She was the president of the Cephalopod International Advisory Council (CIAC) from 2012 to 2015.

Allcock has also worked on gender equality, and is a member of the gender equality task force in Ireland. She has highlighted the role and impact of female researchers in cephalopod research.

Allcock's research focuses on the ecology, evolutionary biology and systematics of molluscs. Her research expertise also lies in benthic ecology. She has participated in cruises in and around the Antarctic and the South Atlantic Ocean, sometimes as leader. As of summer 2016, she is working on taxonomically poor sponges, cnidarians and ascidians. Since 2013, Allcock has been a lecturer in zoology at University of Galway. She has also served as Bipolar species co-ordinator for the British Antarctic Survey from (June 2009 to March 2010), lecturer in Marine Biology, Queen's University Belfast (September 2002 to March 2008) and Curator of Mollusca, National Museums of Scotland, Edinburgh (July 1998 to August 2002). On 1 February 2018, Allcock was one of the guests on the BBC Radio 4 discussion programme In Our Time, hosted by Melvyn Bragg, about Cephalopods.

== Awards and honours ==
Allcock was the last author on the best scientific paper on cephalopod research 2006–2009 awarded by the Cephalopod International Advisory Council (CIAC). The paper on the origin for deep-sea octopuses was also the highlight in the Census of Marine Life press release at the 1st World Congress of Marine Biodiversity, Valencia 2008. In 2023 she was elected a member of the Royal Irish Academy.

== Selected publications ==
- Wieczorek, A. M.; Morrison, L.; Croot, P. L.; Allcock, A. L.; MacLoughlin, E.; Savard, O.; Brownlow, H.; Doyle, T. K. (2018). "Frequency of Microplastics in Mesopelagic Fishes from the Northwest Atlantic". Frontiers in Marine Science. 5: 39. Bibcode:2018FrMaS...5...39W. doi:10.3389/fmars.2018.00039. hdl:10468/5968.
- Fernandez-Arcaya, U.; Ramirez-Llodra, E.; Aguzzi, J.; Allcock, A. L.; Davies, J. S.; Dissanayake, A.; Harris, P.; Howell, K.; Huvenne, V. A.; Macmillan-Lawler, M.; Martín, J.; Menot, L.; Nizinski, M.; Puig, P.; Rowden, A. A.; Sanchez, F.; Van den Beld, I. M. (2017). "Ecological Role of Submarine Canyons and Need for Canyon Conservation: A Review". Frontiers in Marine Science. 4: 5. Bibcode:2017FrMaS...4....5F. doi:10.3389/fmars.2017.00005. hdl:10261/153054.
- Strugnell, J.M.; Norman, M.D.; Vecchione, M.; Guzik, M.; Allcock, A.L. (March 2014). "The ink sac clouds octopod evolutionary history". Hydrobiologia. 725 (1): 215–235. Bibcode:2014HyBio.725..215S. doi:10.1007/s10750-013-1517-6.
- Allcock, A.L.; Lindgren, A.; Strugnell, J.M. (2015). "The contribution of molecular data to our understanding of cephalopod evolution and systematics: a review". Journal of Natural History. 49 (21–24): 1373–1421. Bibcode:2015JNatH..49.1373A. doi:10.1080/00222933.2013.825342. S2CID 85127519.
- Wilson, A.M.; Kiriakoulakis, K.; Raine, R.; Gerritsen, H.D.; Blackbird, S.; Allcock, A.L.; White, M. (2015). "Anthropogenic influence on sediment transport in the Whittard Canyon, NE Atlantic" (PDF). Marine Pollution Bulletin. 101 (1): 320–329. Bibcode:2015MarPB.101..320W. doi:10.1016/j.marpolbul.2015.10.067. PMID 26530881.
- Winkelmann, I.; Campos, P. F.; Strugnell, J.; Cherel, Y.; Smith, P. J.; Kubodera, T.; Allcock, L. M.; Kampmann, M.; Schroeder, H.; Guerra, A.; Norman, M.D.; Finn, J.; Ingrao, D.; Clarke, M.; Gilbert, M.T.P. (22 May 2013). "Mitochondrial genome diversity and population structure of the giant squid Architeuthis: genetics sheds new light on one of the most enigmatic marine species". Proceedings of the Royal Society B. 280 (1759). doi:10.1098/rspb.2013.0273. PMC 3619516. PMID 23516246.
- Allcock, A.L.; Strugnell, J.M. (2012). "Southern Ocean diversity: new paradigms from molecular ecology". Trends in Ecology & Evolution. 27 (9): 520–528. Bibcode:2012TEcoE..27..520A. doi:10.1016/j.tree.2012.05.009. PMID 22727016.
- Hanlon, Roger; Vecchione, Mike; Allcock, Louise (2018). Octopus, Squid, and Cuttlefish: A Visual Scientific Guide to the Oceans' Most Advanced Invertebrates. University of Chicago Press. ISBN 9780226459561.
