= Rosemary Askin =

New Zealand geologist

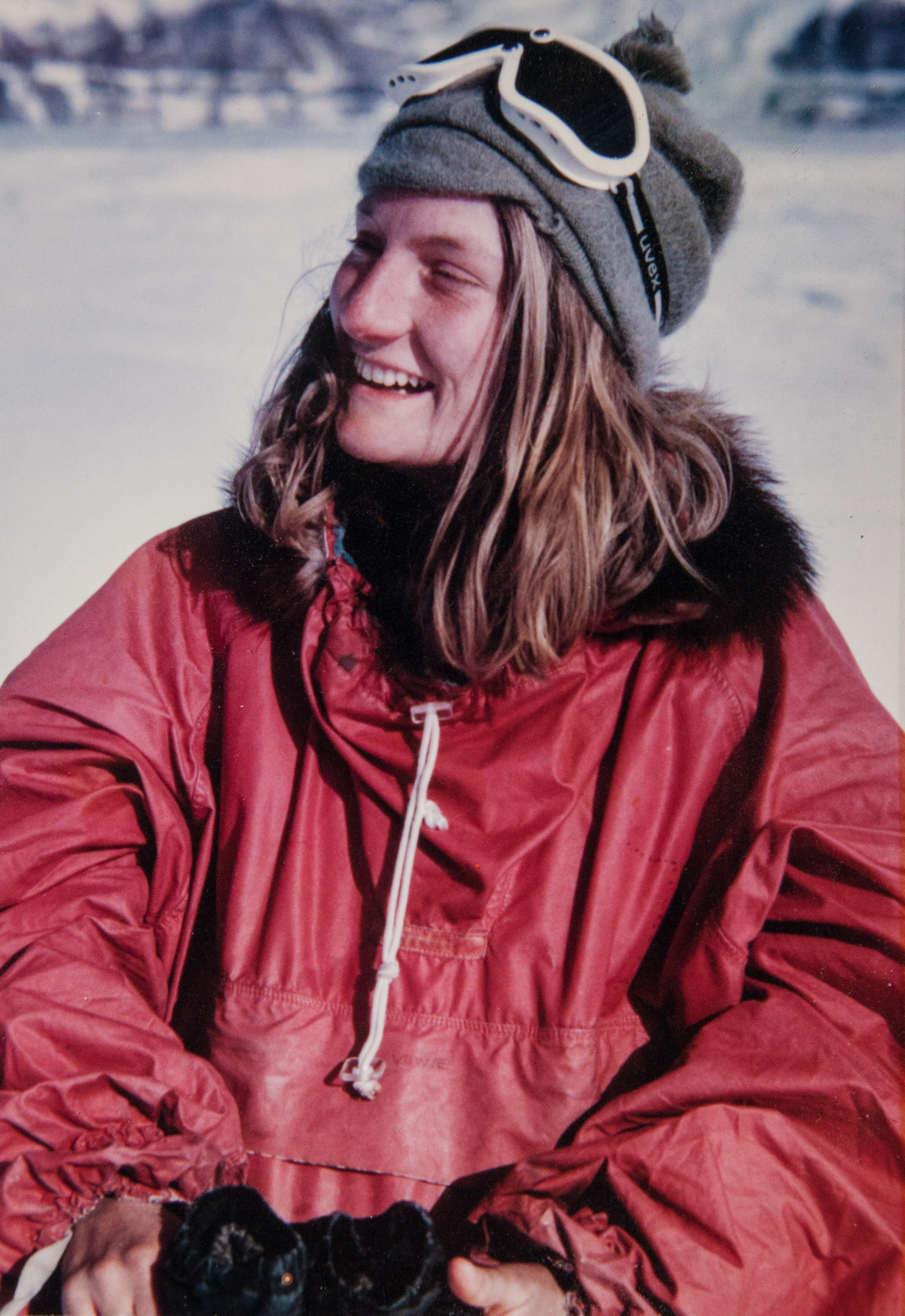
- Askin in Skelton Névé, Antarctica (1970)
- Born: 1949 (age 76–77)
- Education: Victoria University, Wellington
- Scientific career
- Fields: Antarctic Geology
- Workplaces: Byrd Polar Research Center; Ohio State University

Rosemary Anne Askin (born 1949), also known as Rosemary Askin Cully, is a New Zealand geologist specialising in Antarctic palynology. She was a trailblazer for women in Antarctic science, becoming the first New Zealand woman to undertake her own research programme in Antarctica in 1970.

== Early life and education ==
Born in 1949, Askin earned both her BSc honours degree in geology and zoology and her PhD in geology from Victoria University, Wellington, New Zealand.

== Career and impact ==
Askin was a trailblazer for women in Antarctica. She was the first New Zealand woman to undertake her own scientific programme in Antarctica, as well as the first woman to work in a deep field setting in Antarctica, when in 1970 she conducted research in Victoria Land at the age of 21. The expedition resulted in the discovery of Antarctica's richest-known site of fossilised fish remains. The younger rocks in this area became the basis for Askin's PhD research. Askin received high praise for her geological work as well as her fortitude during the 1970–71 season, with Scott Base leader Brian Porter remarking that Askin had "gained the respect and admiration of all the men of the 1970–71 New Zealand Antarctic Research Programme and set a high standard for future women who may be involved in research in Antarctica, traditionally a man's world only". Askin returned to the Antarctic numerous times between 1970 and 2001, completing expeditions to diverse parts of Antarctica including the Antarctic Peninsula, the South Shetland Islands, Victoria Land, and the Transantarctic Mountains. Mount Askin in the Darwin Mountains is named after her.

Askin has researched and taught in several US universities, including The Ohio State University, Colorado School of Mines, and the University of California, Riverside. Askin's research interests include terrestrial palynology and the vegetational/palaeoenvironmental history of the Permian-Triassic and Cenozoic periods in Antarctica. Among other things, her research has examined fossil pollen and spores, fossilised over 350 million to a few million years ago, to see how vegetation has changed over time. In 1982, Askin also was a member of the research team that discovered the first mammal fossils in Antarctica, and she was involved in research that demonstrated that Antarctica experienced an abrupt warming cycle 15 million years ago. More recently, Askin spearheaded the establishment of the US Polar Rock Repository at the Byrd Polar Research Center, Ohio State University, the first repository of its kind.

== Personal life ==
Askin is a Tai Chi & Qigong and karate teacher, and holds a 3rd Degree Black Belt (Sandan) in karate and a Tai Chi Advanced level (2013) from the Shorin-ryu Karatedo and Kobudo Association of America.

== Awards and honours ==
In 2017, she was selected as one of the Royal Society of New Zealand's "150 women in 150 words".

== Selected publications ==
- Askin, Rosemary A. "Campanian to Paleocene palynological succession of Seymour and adjacent islands, northeastern Antarctic Peninsula." Geological Society of America Memoirs 169 (1988): 131–154.
- Askin, Rosemary A. "Endemism and heterochroneity in the Late Cretaceous (Campanian) to Paleocene palynofloras of Seymour Island, Antarctica: implications for origins, dispersal and palaeoclimates of southern floras." Geological Society, London, Special Publications 47.1 (1989): 107–119.
- Askin, Rosemary A. "Campanian to Paleocene spore and pollen assemblages of Seymour Island, Antarctica." Review of Palaeobotany and Palynology 65.1 (1990): 105–113.
- Askin, Rosemary A. "Late Cretaceous–early Tertiary Antarctic outcrop evidence for past vegetation and climates." The Antarctic Paleoenvironment: a perspective on global change: Part One (1992): 61–74.
- Isbell, John L., Paul A. Lenaker, Rosemary A. Askin, Molly F. Miller, and Loren E. Babcock. "Reevaluation of the timing and extent of late Paleozoic glaciation in Gondwana: Role of the Transantarctic Mountains." Geology 31, no. 11 (2003): 977–980.
- Collinson, James W., Hammer, William R., Askin, Rosemary A. and David H. Elliot. "Permian-Triassic boundary in the central Transantarctic Mountains, Antarctica." Geological Society of American Bulletin 118 (5/6) (2006): 747–763, Data Repos. Item 2006080.
- Warny, Sophie and Rosemary Askin. "Vegetation and organic-walled phytoplankton at the end of the Antarctic greenhouse world: latest Eocene cooling events." In Anderson, J.B. and Wellner, J.S. (Eds.), Tectonic, Climatic, and Cryospheric Evolution of the Antarctic Peninsula. American Geophysical Union, Washington, D.C. (2011): 193–210.
