= Deborah Steinberg =

American Antarctic biological oceanographer

- Education: B.A. University of California Santa Barbara Ph.D. University of California Santa Cruz
- Known for: Interdisciplinary oceanography and zooplankton ecology
- Scientific career
- Fields: Oceanography
- Workplaces: Virginia Institute of Marine Science, The College of William and Mary
- Website: Deborah Steinberg at VIMS

Deborah K. Steinberg is an American Antarctic biological oceanographer who works on interdisciplinary oceanographic research programs. Steinberg's research focuses on the role that zooplankton play in marine food webs and the global carbon cycle, and how these small drifting animals are affected by changes in climate.

== Early life and education ==
Steinberg received her B.A. at the University of California Santa Barbara in 1987. During her undergraduate studies she was a member of a science team for winter research expedition in Antarctica. She received a PhD at the University of California Santa Cruz in 1993 focusing on zooplankton and marine dynamics. After graduation she joined the Bermuda Institute of Ocean Sciences as a Research Scientist where she remained until 2001. She then joined the Virginia Institute of Marine Sciences, where she is a CSX Professor of Marine Science.

== Career and impact ==
Steinberg has been an international leader in understanding the zooplankton and jellyfish ecology along with how the food web structures the flux of carbon to the deep sea. Since 2008, she has worked at Palmer Station within the US National Science Foundation Long-Term Ecological Research (LTER) program focusing on understanding how rapid warming drives ecosystem change.

Her research program focuses on how zooplankton influence cycling of nutrients and organic matter, and how climate affects long-term change in zooplankton communities. Steinberg's laboratory has been involved in a number of projects with this theme, including the role of zooplankton vertical migration in transport of nutrients, the ecology of gelatinous zooplankton "blooms" and their effect on fluxes of organic matter, the importance of zooplankton in the cycling of dissolved organic matter, mesopelagic zooplankton and particle flux, and the effects of mesoscale eddies and a large river plume on zooplankton community structure. They are also using long-term data sets from the Western Antarctic Peninsula and the Sargasso Sea off Bermuda to study the effects of climate change on zooplankton communities, and how these community changes may affect ocean food webs and biogeochemistry.

Steinberg has worked in a number of marine environments including coastal California, Antarctic, Sargasso Sea, the subtropical and subarctic North Pacific, the Amazon River plume, and the Chesapeake Bay. In the Antarctic, she oversees the krill research of Kim Bernard and her team known as "The Psycho Krillers".

Steinberg has spent collectively more than 1.5 years at sea on more than 50 research cruises, and starred in the documentary "Antarctic Edge: 70° South.

== Projects ==
- Long Term Ecological Research Network: Land-shelf-ocean connectivity, ecosystem resilience, and transformation in a sea-ice influenced pelagic ecosystem (NSF OPP)
- The Bermuda Atlantic Time-series Study: Sustained Biogeochemical, Ecosystem, and Ocean Change Observations and Linkages in the Subtropical North Atlantic (NSF OCE)
- CSBR: Natural History: Organization and digitization of the larval fish collection at the Virginia Institute of Marine Science (NSF DBI)
- Jellyfish population dynamics in the Chesapeake Bay (Graduate Fellow - Joshua Stone) (Virginia Sea Grant, NOAA)

== Awards and honors ==
- 2015 - State Council of Higher Education for Virginia (SCHEV) Outstanding Faculty Award
- 2014 - CSX Eminent Scholar Professorship/ Chair in Marine Science
- 2014 - William & Mary Plumeri Award for Faculty Excellence
- 2013 - William & Mary Tack Faculty lecture
- 2012 - Sverdrup Award lecture, Ocean Sciences, American Geophysical Union (AGU)
- 2007 - Winner of William and Mary Raft Debate
- 2006 - Dean's Prize for Advancement of Women in Marine Science
- 2005 - College of William & Mary Class of 1964 Distinguished Associate Professor of Marine Science
- 2005 - Elected to the board of trustees, Bermuda Institute of Ocean Sciences, Inc.
- 1987 - National Science Foundation Antarctic Service Award and Medal

== Professional memberships ==
- American Society of Limnology and Oceanography (ASLO)
- The Oceanography Society (TOS)
- American Geophysical Union (AGU)

== Selected works ==
- Steinberg, Deborah K., et al. "Overview of the US JGOFS Bermuda Atlantic Time-series Study (BATS): a decade-scale look at ocean biology and biogeochemistry." Deep-Sea Research Part II: Topical Studies in Oceanography 48.8 (2001): 1405-1447.
- Steinberg, Deborah A., et al. "Protegrin-1: a broad-spectrum, rapidly microbicidal peptide with in vivo activity." Antimicrobial Agents and Chemotherapy 41.8 (1997): 1738-1742.
- Steinberg, Deborah K., et al. "Zooplankton vertical migration and the active transport of dissolved organic and inorganic carbon in the Sargasso Sea." Deep-Sea Research Part I: Oceanographic Research Papers 47.1 (2000): 137-158.
