= Justine Shaw =

Australian Antarctic researcher

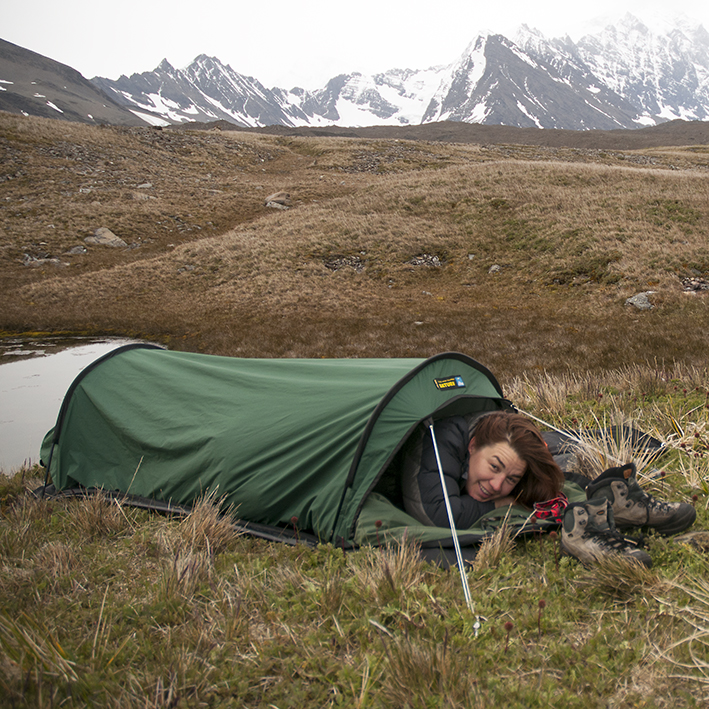
- Justine Shaw on South Georgia
- Education: BSc The University of Queensland; PhD University of Tasmania
- Known for: Antarctic Conservation
- Scientific career
- Fields: Conservation science
- Workplaces: University of Queensland; Australian Antarctic Division
- Website: Justine Shaw at National Environmental Science Programme

Justine Shaw is an Australian Antarctic researcher, best known for her conservation work on subantarctic islands, currently working at the Queensland University of Technology. She has a wide global research network, having worked in Australia, South Africa, sub-Antarctic/Antarctic and the Arctic.

== Early life and education ==
Shaw completed her BSc at the University of Queensland in 1996. Her first field season with the Australian National Antarctic Research Expedition was to Macquarie Island in the summer of 1996. She received her PhD in 2005 from the University of Tasmania, focusing on the plant ecology of subantarctic islands. She undertook a Postdoctoral Fellowship at the Centre of Excellence for Invasion Biology, Stellenbosch University, South Africa from 2007 to 2010.

== Career and impact ==
=== Research ===
Shaw is currently a Research Fellow at the Centre for Biodiversity and Conservation Science, School of Biological Sciences, at the University of Queensland. She has spent 20 years focused on Antarctic conservation science and environmental policy; working on a diverse range of plants and animals, ecosystems and management issues. Her main research areas include: multiple species interactions, impacts of non-native species, design of Antarctic Protected Areas, and island conservation by invasive species eradication. Her research has directly impacted policy, via her advice to the Australian state and federal governments and through her work for the Committee for Environmental Protection of the Antarctic Treaty System. She regularly leads workshops and conferences on issues relating to invasive species, Antarctic biodiversity and threatened species management for academic research groups and government agencies.

Her seminal work on Antarctic Protected Areas was published in the high impact journal PLOS Biology in 2014. This work had wide uptake in the media at a global scale appearing in Australian, Indian, French, US and Malaysian newspapers, reporting that Antarctic terrestrial ecosystems require greater protection from human activities. Her research received its most prominent exposure when it was profiled on a segment on Last Week Tonight highlighting the risk to Antarctica posed by human visitors, with the YouTube clip alone reaching over 2 million views.

Shaw has undertaken field research and led science research teams to the sub-Antarctic Heard, Macquarie, Marion, Prince Edward and South Georgia islands. She has been a member of the Australian National Antarctic program, the South African National Antarctic Programme and been hosted by the British Antarctic Survey. Altogether she has spent almost 3 years on various subantarctic islands. She has travelled on numerous research vessels across much of the Southern Ocean.

Shaw is currently examining the risks posed by non-native species to Antarctic protected areas, examining the interactions between indigenous and non-native species, and investigating how invasive species influence ecosystem function.

Shaw was appointed to the Australia Government's Threatened Species Scientific Committee in December 2023.

=== Outreach and community support ===
Shaw has also worked to improve outreach, collaboration, and networking within the Antarctic research community. In 2014, she co-founded Women in Polar Science, an interdisciplinary professional network, which uses social media to connect people around the issues and achievements of women working in polar science. Shaw was one of the co-founders of Homeward Bound, a training program for leadership for women in STEM which culminates 12 months of training with a voyage to Antarctica. She was member of the onboard voyage faculty in 2016 & 2018. She drives science and leadership within the program. She has discussed her research and Antarctic protection on several radio programs, including 3RRR and ABC Hobart. Dr Shaw is a member of the Australian Academy of Science's Early Mid Career Forum Executive Committee. In this role she works to bring the voice and needs of Australia's early career scientific researchers to the broader science community and science policy makers.
