= Verónica Vallejos =

Chilean marine biologist and Antarctic scientist

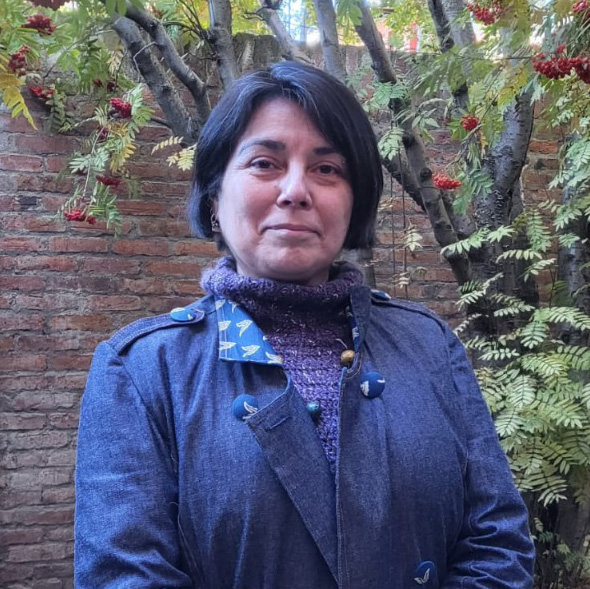
- Education: University of Valparaiso
- Scientific career
- Workplaces: Chilean Antarctic Institute (INACH)

Verónica Isabel Vallejos Marchant (born c. 1967) is the Head of the Projects and Environment Department at the Chilean Antarctic Institute (INACH) and a member of the Committee for Environmental Protection (CEP). She is considered a trailblazer for Chilean women in Antarctic research.

== Early life and education ==
Vallejos was born and raised in Santiago, Chile and received her degree in Marine Biology from the University of Valparaiso followed by a Masters in Conservation of Natural Resources.

== Career and impact ==
Vallejos is the Head of the Projects and Environment Department at the Chilean Antarctic Institute (INACH) and a member of the Committee for Environmental Protection (CEP). She first travelled to Antarctica in 1995 and visited 10 times subsequently. She works to support Chilean Antarctic researchers in international collaboration.
