= Christina Riesselman =

American paleoceanographer

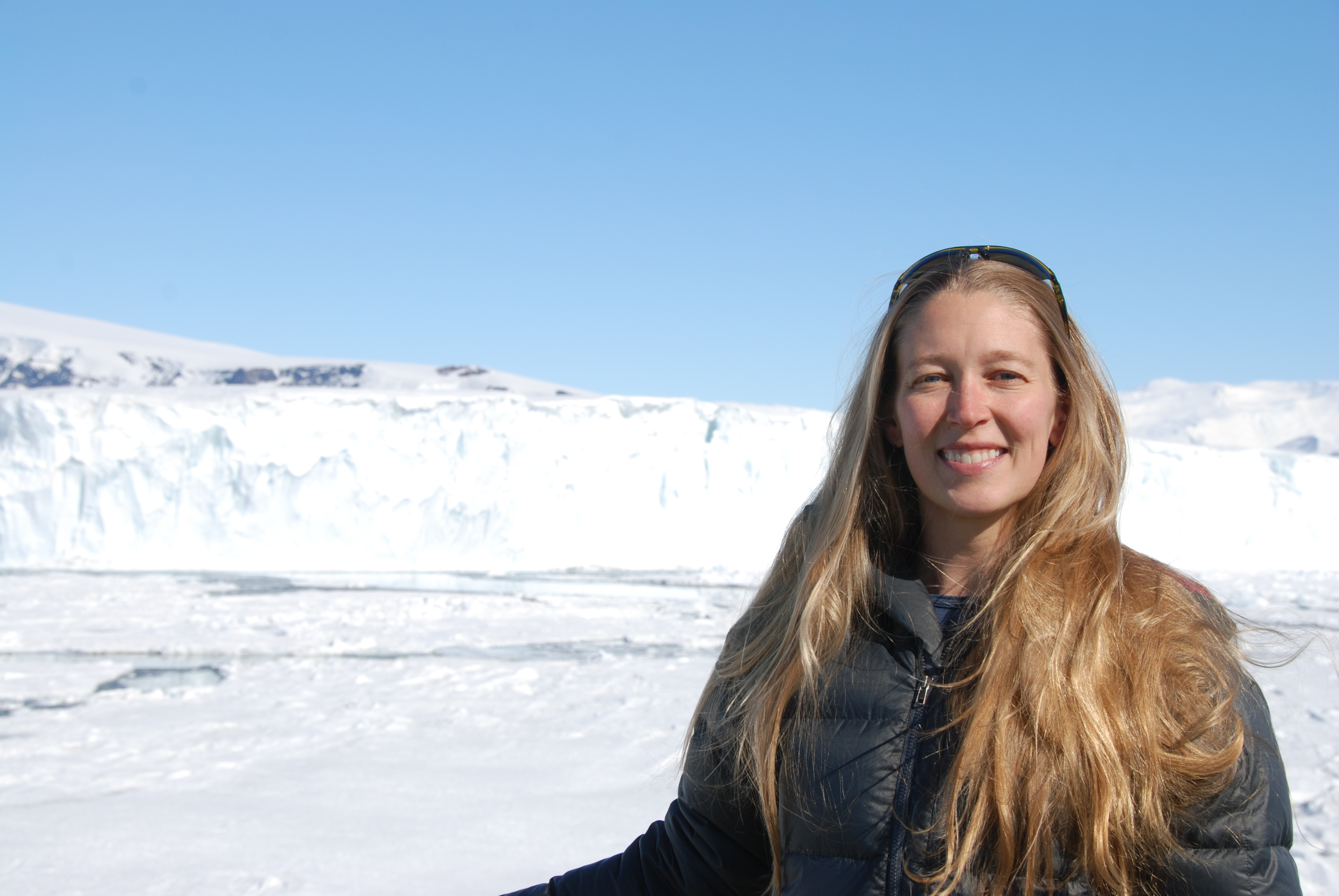
- Christina Riesselman in Moubray Bay
- Education: BSc University of Nebraska–Lincoln; PhD Stanford University
- Spouse: Chris Moy
- Awards: L’Oréal-UNESCO Fellowship For Women in Science (2015)
- Scientific career
- Fields: Paleoceanography
- Workplaces: University of Otago
- Website: Riesselman at University of Otago

Christina Riesselman is an American paleoceanographer whose research focus is on Southern Ocean response to changing climate.

== Early life and education ==
After completing her bachelor's degree at the University of Nebraska–Lincoln in geology and English in 2001, Riesselman spent time at the Joint Oceanographic Institution in Washington DC, then moved to Stanford for her PhD thesis entitled "Marine geochemical and micropaleontologic constraints on cenozoic antarctic cryosphere evolution" which was completed in 2011.

== Career ==
Following postdoctoral work as a Research Scientist with the US Geological Survey, she moved to the University of Otago, New Zealand in 2013.

Riesselman uses diatom micropaleontology and stable isotope geochemistry in marine sediments to examine the evolution of the Antarctic cryosphere through the Cenozoic. She also participates in collaborative investigations into the modern controls on phytoplankton community structure.

Riesselman with her husband, Chris Moy, a University of Otago paleoclimatologist, were among the 30 researchers on a 2019 voyage of the JOIDES Resolution. The aim of the voyage, according to Reisselman, was to figure out how ocean circulation behaved during past warmer climates, up to three million years ago.

In 2019 she was appointed co-Principal Investigator on a N.Z. Antarctic Science Platform project on Antarctic oceans.

== Awards and honors ==
Riesselman won the inaugural L’Oréal-UNESCO Fellowship for Women in Science New Zealand in 2015.

== Publications ==
=== Journal - Research Article ===
- Ohneiser, C., Yoo, K.-C., Albot, O. B., Cortese, G., Riesselman, C., Lee, J. I., … Bollen, M., … Beltran, C., … Wilson, G. S. (2019). Magneto-biostratigraphic age models for Pleistocene sedimentary records from the Ross Sea. Global & Planetary Change. Advance online publication. doi: 10.1016/j.gloplacha.2019.02.013
- Wilson, D. J., Bertram, R. A., Needham, E. F., van der Flierdt, T., Welsh, K. J., McKay, R. M., … Riesselman, C. R., … Escutia, C. (2018). Ice loss from the East Antarctic Ice Sheet during late Pleistocene interglacials. Nature, 561, 383-386. doi: 10.1038/s41586-018-0501-8
- Taylor-Silva, B. I., & Riesselman, C. R. (2018). Polar frontal migration in the warm late Pliocene: Diatom evidence from the Wilkes Land margin, East Antarctica. Paleoceanography & Paleoclimatology, 33(1), 76-92. doi: 10.1002/2017PA003225
- Pettinger, V., Martin, C. E., & Riesselman, C. R. (2018). Sources and downstream variation of surface water chemistry in the dammed Waitaki catchment, South Island, New Zealand. New Zealand Journal of Geology & Geophysics, 61(2), 207-218. doi: 10.1080/00288306.2018.1465985
- Bertram, R. A., Wilson, D. J., van de Flierdt, T., McKay, R. M., Patterson, M. O., Jimenez-Espejo, F. J., … Duke, G. C., Taylor-Silva, B. I., & Riesselman, C. R. (2018). Pliocene deglacial event timelines and the biogeochemical response offshore Wilkes Subglacial Basin, East Antarctica. Earth & Planetary Science Letters, 494, 109-116. doi: 10.1016/j.epsl.2018.04.05
