= Vivian Pellizari =

Brazilian Antarctic scientist

- Education: University of São Paulo
- Scientific career
- Fields: Antarctic microbiology
- Workplaces: Oceanographic Institute, University of Sao Paulo
- Website: www.io.usp.br

Vivian Helena Pellizari is a Brazilian Antarctic scientist known for her work on establishing Antarctic microbiology in Brazil. Pellizari is the head of Department of Oceanographic Biology at Oceanographic Institute of University of São Paulo.

== Early life and education ==
Pellizari received her master's degree in 1992 from the University of São Paulo (USP), Brazil. At the beginning of her PhD she contacted the Oceanographic Institute at University of São Paulo with the first proposal to for Brazilian Antarctic Program covering microbial ecology goals. She then obtained her PhD in 1996 in Biological Sciences (Microbiology) from the University of São Paulo. The title of her thesis was “Phenotypic and molecular aspects of bacteria isolated from the environment and involved in biodegradation Biphenyls (PCBs)". She spent 1 year as a postdoctoral researcher at Center for Microbial Ecology at Michigan State University in the Tiedje Lab.

== Career and impact ==
Pellizari’s research focuses on extremophiles, microbiology, and marine microbial ecology in different Antarctic ecosystems. Pellizari has also contributed to the formation of new Antarctic research areas in Latin America including astrobiology, genomics of extremophiles and molecular microbial ecology. She is part of a consortium addressing the topic Aerobiology Over Antarctica, and was part of the National Institute of Science and technology – Antarctic Environmental Research INCT –APA and support projects related with Brazilian National Institute of cryospheric science and technology .

Pellizari is the head of Department of Oceanographic Biology at Oceanographic Institute (IO) of University of São Paulo and a member of the scientific committee of Center of Antarctica Research (CPA) at University of São Paulo. The Oceanographic Institute was a pioneer in Antarctic expeditions, being part of the Brazilian Antarctic Program since the first expedition in 1982. Pellizari has been part of the program since 1996 and first worked in Antarctica in 1997.

In 2005, after 6 years in the Antarctic Program she organized a network of microbiologists, called the MicroPolar Network, to improve the microbial ecology research in Antarctica. This was created in 2005 under the umbrella of the Brazilian Antarctic Program (PROANTAR). The MicroPolar Network is coordinated by Pellizari and includes more than 15 professors and their teams from seven different Universities. The MicroPolar Network has generated important survey data on micro organisms adapted to survive in cold, dry, oligotrophic ecosystems with great temperature fluctuations, particularly in the Antarctic Peninsula - one of the regions most affected by the effects of climate change.

Pellizari has been a driver in the establishment of scientific networks across Latin America to investigate microbiology (Red Latinoamericana de Microbiologia Antartica) integrating microbiologists from Brazil, Uruguay, Argentina and Chile. She is active in the Scientific Committee on Antarctic Research (SCAR) and is the Brazilian delegate of Life Sciences and was the alternate delegate of Brazil in SCAR in 2012. She was an author of the Antarctic Science Action Plan for Brazil. She is a member of the Technical Scientific Committee of the Integrated ocean Drilling Program within CAPES.

Pellizari has been involved in the organisation of public outreach events to share information about the Antarctic environment at schools; scientific fairs and public places as parks (Vila Lobos Park) and subways in the city of São Paulo.
