= Mary Alice McWhinnie =

American biologist and academic (1922–1980)

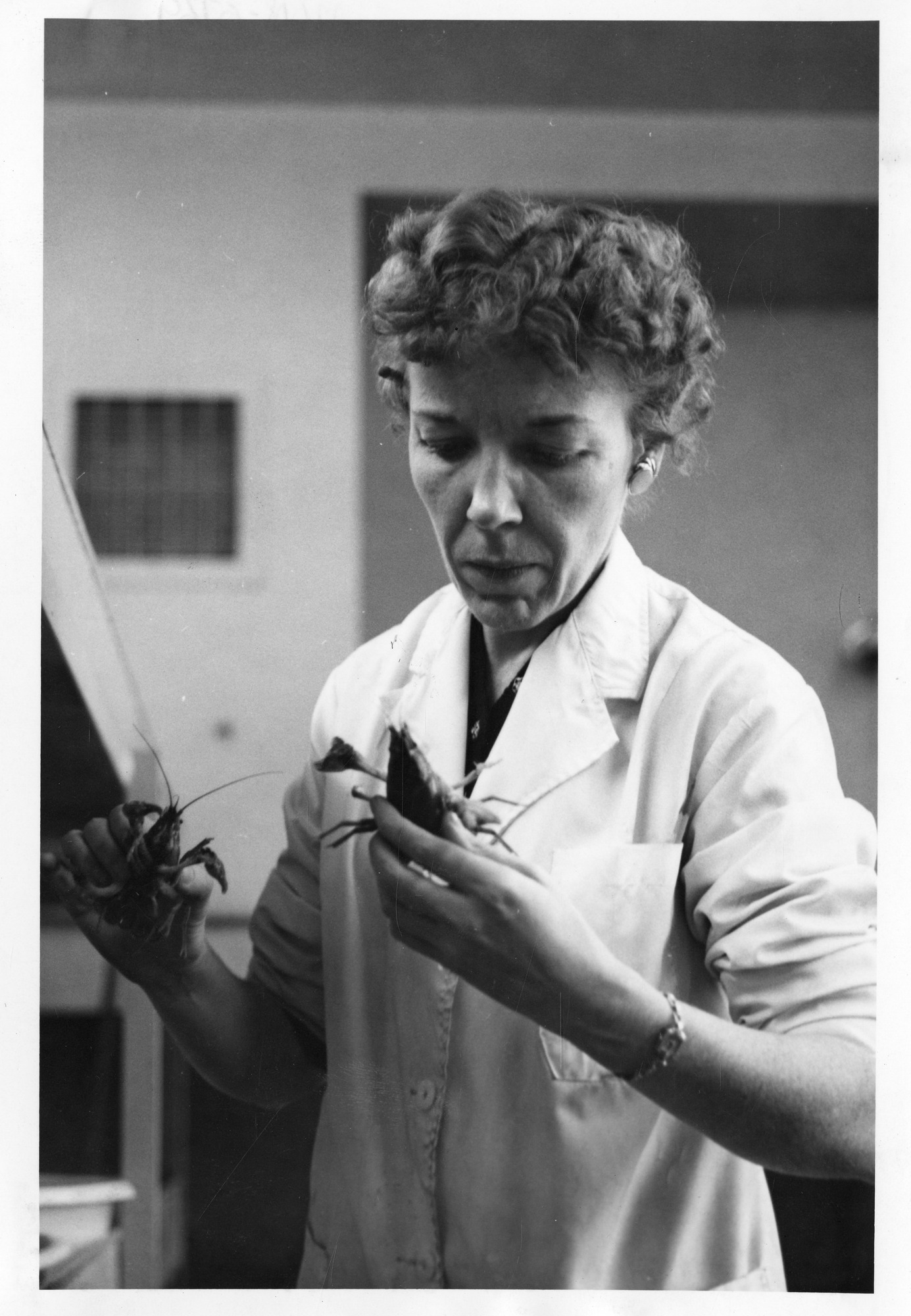
- McWhinnie in 1962
- Born: August 10, 1922; Chicago, Illinois
- Died: March 17, 1980 (aged 57)
- Citizenship: United States
- Education: Bsc DePaul University; PhD Northwestern University
- Known for: Biology of Krill
- Scientific career
- Fields: Biology
- Workplaces: DePaul University

Mary Alice McWhinnie (August 10, 1922 – March 17, 1980) was an American biologist, professor at DePaul University and an authority on krill. From Chicago, Illinois, she was the first woman to sail for two months in Antarctic waters aboard the NSF's research vessel, USNS Eltanin. The National Science Foundation eventually allowed her to winter over at McMurdo Station and in 1974, she became the first American woman to serve as chief scientist at an Antarctic research station.

== Education and early career ==
Mary Alice McWhinnie received her bachelor's and master's degrees in biology from DePaul University in 1944 and 1946. She began teaching at DePaul University in 1946 in the Department of Biological Sciences as a Graduate Assistant and was its chairman from 1966 to 1968. She received her doctorate from Northwestern University in 1952.

== Scientific career ==
In 1962, she and her research assistant, Phyllis Marciniack, were selected by the National Science Foundation (NSF) to sail for two months on the USNS Eltanin (Cruise 6, 24 November 1962 – 23 January 1963) in the Antarctic. Their plan was to study "the relation of water temperature to the physiology of molting crustaceans," namely, how krills' physiology and how it managed to thrive in such an extreme environment.

She completed four cruises on the Eltanin in 1965, 1967, 1969 and 1970 making her the first woman scientist to sail Antarctic waters. Duke University introduced a cooperative oceanographic program at the Marine Laboratory with Dr. McWhinnie in 1965. The program was sponsored by the NSF and available to Duke and other cooperating universities including Paul, City College of New York, Virginia Institute of Marine Sciences, and the Universities of Tennessee.

In 1972, McWhinnie was appointed the first female chief scientist on the Eltanin. Until 1969, United States' Antarctic programs were all male but in 1974, McWhinnie and her research assistant, Mary Odile Cahoon were the first women scientists to winter-over at McMurdo Station, the largest and most accessible station in Antarctica with 128 men. During the 1975-76 summer season, she was the first female scientist to work at Palmer Station. Her career included eleven trips to the Antarctic, more than fifty published scientific papers, and many presentations of research findings. In the 1977–78 and 1978-79 summers, McWhinnie succeeded in keeping krill alive in a flow-through seawater tank. During the observation, they found that krill become smaller and less sexually mature in appearance after spawning, a phenomenon called "regression". She determined this was a result of the animals having to swim constantly with limited food supply in winter. McWhinnie also conducted a significant amount of research into the field of Crustecdysone Mediated Changes in Crayfish. One of these noted changes is that of molting. McWhinnie noted that the molting process of crayfish is needed for growth in the organism, and results in lower levels of organic material present during the stages of premolt. She also was careful to discern that premolt crayfish regularly have higher levels of amino acids in their various tissues than they do during the intermolt stage. [1]

McWhinnie also focused a lot of her research on the respiration processes of the Antarctic copepod, R. gigas. During an austral winter, McWhinnie measured the procurement of oxygen and the production of carbon dioxide from copepods. With the discovery that oxygen levels were lower than those from lower latitude specimens, she concluded that a new type of metabolic adaptation had been developed in order to create two periods of reproduction.

She spent the three years before her death in 1980, traveling internationally, lecturing on various aspects of krill and amassing an extensive bibliography. She died from a brain tumor on March 17, 1980.

== Legacy ==
Honored with an Antarctic mountain peak, McWhinnie Peak. Mary Alice McWhinnie Marine Science Center at Palmer Station is also named in her honor. She was posthumously awarded DePaul University's highest faculty honor, the Via Sapientiae Award, for her dedication to teaching and scientific accomplishments in June 1980.
