= Irene Schloss =

Argentine Antarctic researcher

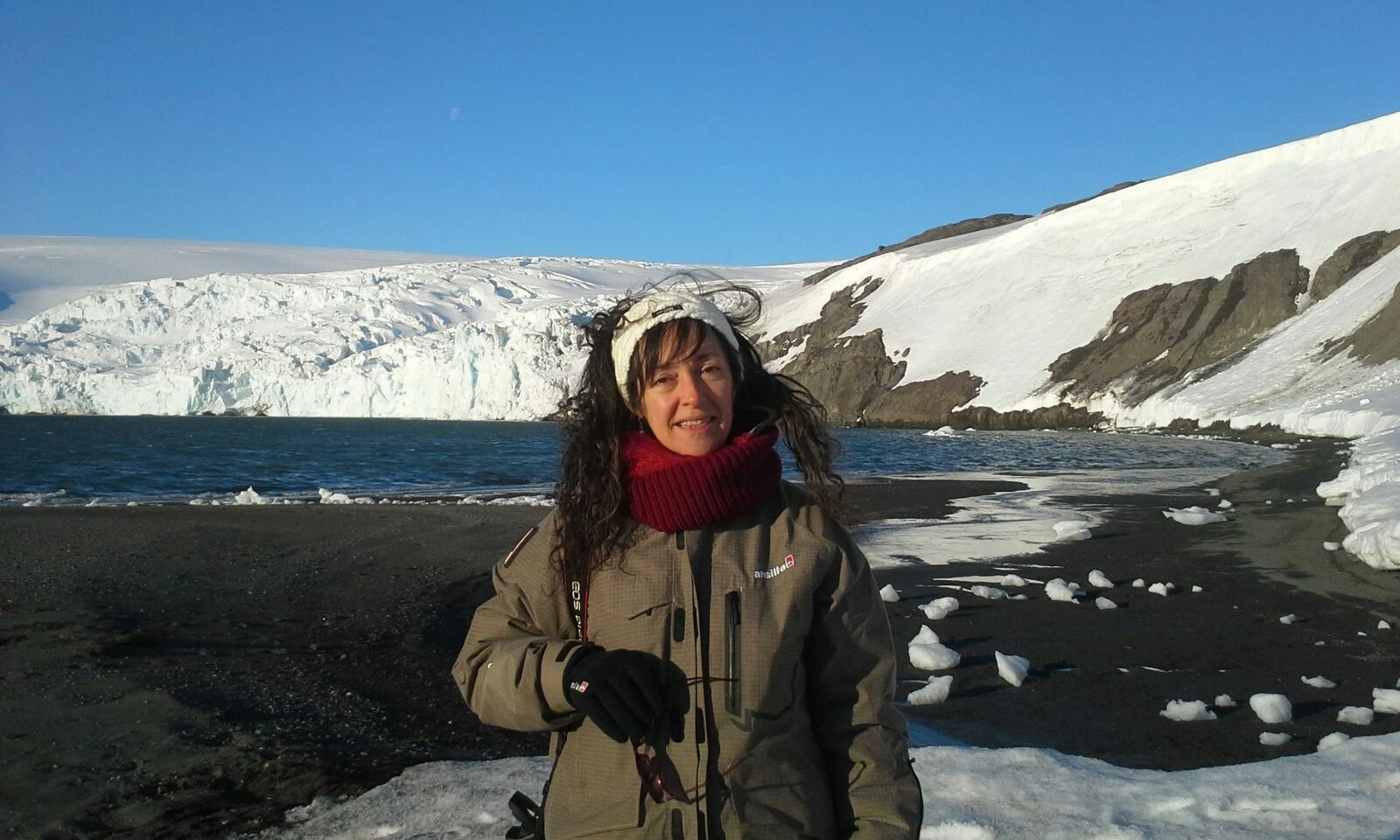
- Irene Schloss at Carlini Base
- Born: 1962 (age 63–64); Buenos Aires, Argentina
- Education: University of Buenos Aires
- Scientific career
- Fields: Plankton biology
- Workplaces: Argentine Antarctic Institute; National Scientific and Technical Research Council - Argentina; University of Quebec
- Website: Irene Schloss at the University of Quebec

Irene Ruth Schloss (Spanish pronunciation: [iˈɾene ˈrut ʃlos]; born 1962) is an Antarctic researcher, best known for her work on plankton biology. She is a researcher at the Argentine Antarctic Institute and was a correspondent researcher of the National Scientific and Technical Research Council of Argentina until July 2017. She became an independent researcher since August 2017 and an associate professor at the University of Quebec.

== Early life and education ==
Schloss was born in Buenos Aires, Argentina, where she first completed her “Licenciatura” (equivalent to a MSc) in Biology at the University of Buenos Aires. In 1989 she undertook a fellowship for 6 months (IAESTE and DAAD) at the Alfred-Wegener Institute in Bremerhaven, Germany, participating in the international European “Polarstern” Study (EPOS). She then began her PhD in 1992 as a National Council of the Research (CONICET) fellow in biological oceanography. Throughout her PhD she studied phytoplankton dynamics in coastal Antarctica. She received her PhD degree from the University of Buenos Aires in 1997. Between 2005 and 2007, she was a post-doctoral fellow at ISMER, where she studied the dynamics of phytoplankton and physical – biological coupling in the Beaufort Sea (Canadian Arctic).

== Career and impact ==
Schloss is a researcher at the Argentinian Antarctic Institute (IAA) and is a Correspondent Researcher of the National Council of the Research (CONICET) of Argentina. She has been an associate professor at UQAR since 2009, and was a research assistant there since 2008. Her research focuses on the impact of UVB radiation on plankton communities at a range of latitudes, the role of phytoplankton on CO_{2} fluxes between the ocean and the atmosphere and the effects of global change on coastal plankton. She has research expertise in the dynamics of high latitude marine plankton and variations of plankton communities in space and time. Schloss has participated in nine expeditions to Antarctica (ship-based and on Argentinean stations), spending around 17 months in the sixth continent.

Her greatest impact has been in research on the interactions the adaptation and effects of plankton to ocean climate change. Her work has modelled physical-biological interactions during bloom dynamics in coastal Antarctica, in particular the equilibrium between warming, glacier melt water and wind-induced physical turbulence in coastal waters. Her work on the role of plankton groups on CO_{2} dynamics indicated that diatoms are key contributors to atmospheric CO_{2} uptake in surface waters, providing a direct link between biodiversity and climate-relevant processes. Additionally, her work demonstrated links between large-scale atmospheric phenomena (e.g. Southern Annular Mode and El Niño Southern Oscillation) and local phytoplankton dynamics.

Schloss plays a central role in the development of international collaborations in Antarctic research. She has been successful in working in polar science in different countries, such as Argentina, Canada, and Germany through the promotion and participation in numerous international research projects and initiatives, cooperating with researchers from USA, Spain, Belgium, Brazil, Poland, and the UK. She further participates in the development of the Antarctic Environmental Portal. She is particularly involved in the promotion of Antarctic science. She participated at the SCAR Horizon SCAN in 2014.
