= Kathleen Conlan =

Canadian marine biologist

- Born: June 30, 1950 (age 76); Ottawa, Ontario, Canada
- Education: BSc Queen's University; MSc University of Victoria; PhD Carleton University
- Awards: Antarctica Service Medal
- Scientific career
- Fields: Marine biology
- Workplaces: Canadian Museum of Nature
- Website: Conlan at the Canadian Museum of Nature

Kathleen Elizabeth Conlan (born July 30, 1950) is an Antarctic marine biologist who studies sea floor marine life. She was named one of Canada's greatest explorers by Canadian Geographic.

== Early life and education ==
Conlan was born on June 30, 1950, in Ottawa, Ontario. She completed her undergraduate degree, a Bachelor of Science, at Queen's University in 1972, before undertaking a M.Sc. from the University of Victoria in 1977. Conlan completed her Ph.D. at Carleton University in 1988. The title of her Ph.D. thesis was "Systematics and sexual dimorphism: reclassification of the crustacean amphipod genus Jassa (Corophioidea: Ischyroceridae)."

The inspiration for her to study both the Arctic and the Antarctic came from a pioneer Antarctic marine biologist, Dr. John Oliver, who was one of the early divers in the Antarctic. Conlan met Oliver through a colleague, and was invited to be part of his Antarctic research team in 1991. In return, Conlan invited his research team to begin studies in the Canadian Arctic.

== Career and impact ==
Conlan is currently a Research Scientist at the Canadian Museum of Nature. Her research focuses on communities of marine life on the sea floor of the Antarctic and Arctic and the impacts of natural or anthropogenic changes. Conlan's research has had significant impact. Her study of long-term benthic changes near McMurdo Station helped change the U.S. Antarctic Program's procedures for sewage discharge in the Antarctic. She also discovered that the B-15 iceberg (the world's largest recorded iceberg) in Antarctica could impact benthic life over 100 km as it blocked access to their main food supply, the annual plankton bloom. This is a far-reaching effect that had not been previously documented.

Conlan is actively involved within the Scientific Committee on Antarctic Research (SCAR). She is a Canadian representative on SCAR's Standing Scientific Group on Life Sciences (SSG-LS), and has served as Chief Officer of the SSG-LS from 2008 to 2012 and Secretary from 2004 to 2008. Conlan is currently on the selection committee of the prestigious Tinker-Muse Prize for Science and Policy in Antarctica.

Conlan is a long-standing member of the Canadian Committee on Antarctic Research (1998–Present), providing advice and guidance on matters pertaining to Antarctic research and serving as a link between SCAR and the Canadian polar research community. She was Section Head of the Life Sciences-Zoology Program at the Canadian Museum of Nature (2006-2016) and adjunct professor at Carleton University (2004-2013).

Conlan's impact has extended beyond research. She has mentored over 50 students and has given nearly 50 interviews to the media about Antarctica and over 100 popular talks. She has been profiled in four polar exhibits for museums in Canada and the U.S. She has written over 20 scientific papers on the Antarctic and her underwater photographs assist newcomers with identifying Antarctic marine life. She was an educator on the inaugural voyages (2000-2001) of the international Students on Ice program to educate youth about the importance of the Polar Regions. In 2002, Conlan wrote a children's book, titled Under the Ice: A Marine Biologist at Work, published by Kids Can Press.

== Awards and honours ==
Conlan was named as one of Canada's Greatest Explorers in 2015 by Canadian Geographic for her polar research which involved 20 expeditions, 11 of them to Antarctica. She is also the recipient of the Science in Society Children's Book Award from Canadian Science Writers' Association for "Under the Ice" a book for youth featuring her research experiences in the Arctic and Antarctic.

Conlan received an Antarctica Service Medal (1992) from the US Department of the Navy and the National Science Foundation. She is also a 3-time winner of the R. W. Brock Award for best Canadian Museum of Nature research paper (1998, 2003 and 2006).

She was also nominated twice for the YMCA-YWCA Women of Distinction Award in the Technology Category (1999 and 2001).

== Selected works ==
- Barnes, David K. A.; Conlan, Kathleen E. (2007-01-29). "Disturbance, colonization and development of Antarctic benthic communities". Philosophical Transactions of the Royal Society of London B: Biological Sciences. 362 (1477): 11–38. doi:10.1098/rstb.2006.1951. ISSN 0962-8436. PMC 3227166. PMID 17405206.
- Kim, Stacy L.; Thurber, Andrew; Hammerstrom, Kamille; Conlan, Kathleen (2007-08-03). "Seastar response to organic enrichment in an oligotrophic polar habitat". Journal of Experimental Marine Biology and Ecology. 346 (1–2): 66–75. Bibcode:2007JEMBE.346...66K. doi:10.1016/j.jembe.2007.03.004.
- Conlan, Kathleen E. (1991-10-01). "Precopulatory mating behavior and sexual dimorphism in the amphipod Crustacea". Hydrobiologia. 223 (1): 255–282. Bibcode:1991HyBio.223..255C. doi:10.1007/BF00047644. ISSN 0018-8158. S2CID 24832061.
- Conlan, Kathleen E.; Currie, David R.; Dittmann, Sabine; Sorokin, Shirley J.; Hendrycks, Ed (2015-11-30). "Macrofaunal Patterns in and around du Couedic and Bonney Submarine Canyons, South Australia". PLOS ONE. 10 (11) e0143921. Bibcode:2015PLoSO..1043921C. doi:10.1371/journal.pone.0143921. ISSN 1932-6203. PMC 4664417. PMID 26618354.
