= Cristina Takacs-Vesbach =

American microbial ecologist

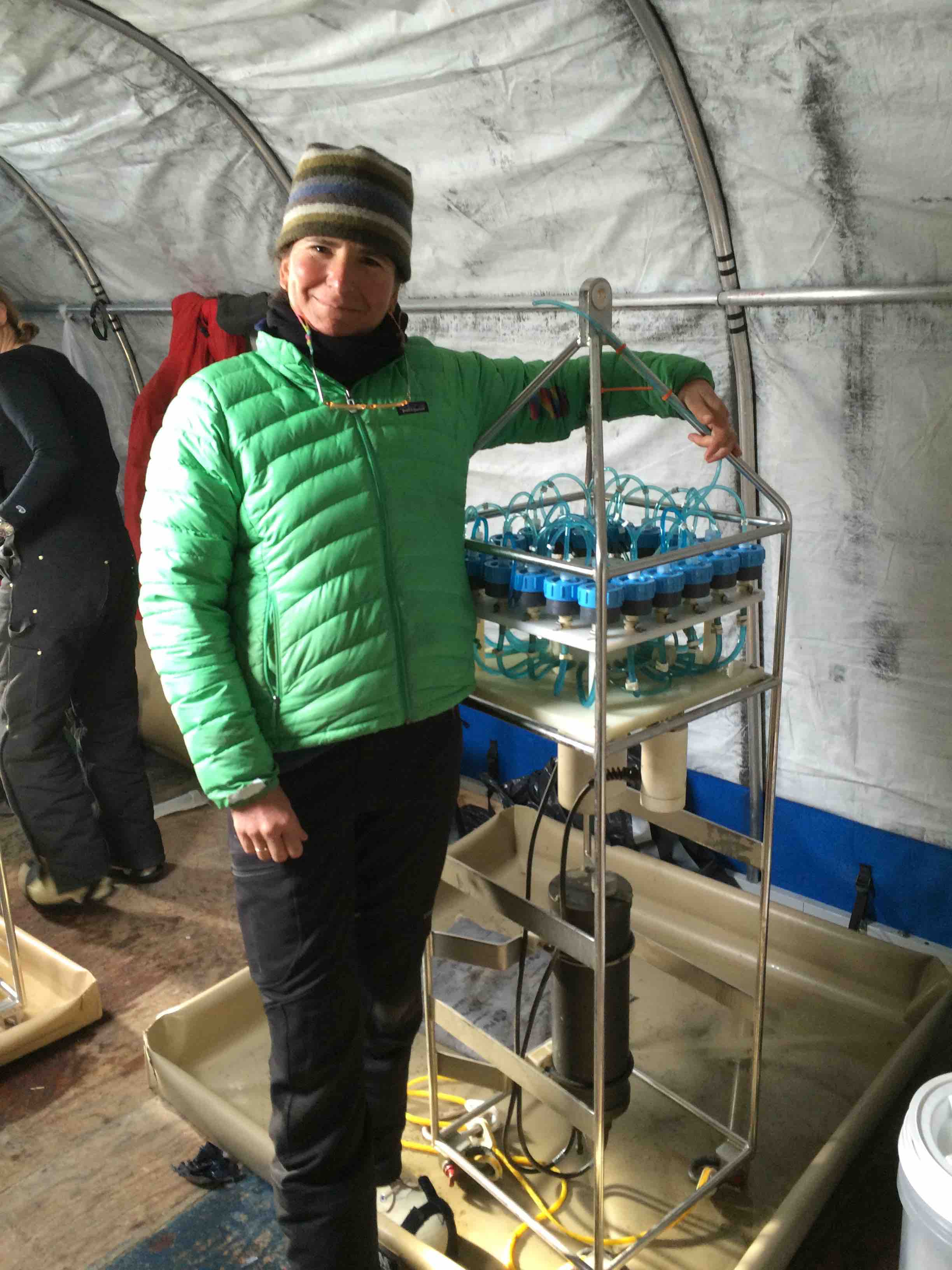
- Born: 1968 (age 57–58)
- Education: University of Colorado Boulder (BS); Montana State University (PhD)
- Scientific career
- Fields: Microbial ecology
- Workplaces: University of New Mexico
- Website: http://www.vesbachlab.org/cristina-takacs-vesbach.html

Cristina Takacs-Vesbach (born 1968) is an American microbial ecologist conducting research on the productivity, diversity, and function of microbial communities living at the two extremes of temperature found on Earth-Antarctica's McMurdo Dry Valleys and Yellowstone National Park's thermal springs.

== Early life and education ==
Takacs-Vesbach was born in New Jersey in 1968 and raised in San Juan, Puerto Rico. Originally, she had a fascination with astrophysics, but after a sophomore-level course in biogeography, taught by Dr. Alex Cruz at University of Colorado Boulder, she was drawn to biology. She graduated in 1991 from CU Boulder with a degree in Environmental, Population, and Organismic Biology.

Takacs-Vesbach developed a passion for microbial ecology in Dr. Brad Tebo's laboratory at Scripps Institution of Oceanography in San Diego, CA in 1994. Interested in microbial thermophiles of Yellowstone National Park research, she joined Dr. John Priscu's laboratory at Montana State University in 1994. Takacs-Vesbach spent three field seasons in the McMurdo Dry Valleys as a graduate student, including one WinFly season. Takacs-Vesbach was one of two US women who were the first to spend WinFly in the McMurdo Dry Valleys. She completed her dissertation research on the factors affecting bacterioplankton biomass and productivity in Antarctic lakes 1999, graduating with a PhD in Microbial Ecology with a minor concentration in Biochemistry from Montana State University.

== Career and impact ==
Following graduation, Takacs-Vesbach took a three-year postdoctoral position with Dr. Anna-Louise Reysenbach at Portland State University where she conducted research on the thermophiles of Yellowstone National Park. In 2002, Takacs-Vesbach joined the faculty of the Department of Biology at the University of New Mexico, awarded tenure in 2009 and promoted to full Professor in 2015.

Takacs-Vesbach's contributions to Antarctic science have been in the field of microbial ecology. Until her doctoral research on bacterioplankton biomass and productivity in the lakes of the McMurdo Dry Valleys, Antarctica, bacterioplankton were considered unimportant. She used a forward difference model to show that not only are bacteria significant to the biomass of these lakes, but that substantial predation occurs every season to reduce bacterial biomass by up to 88% at the height of the growing season. Further work by Takacs-Vesbach in this system included estimates of bacterioplankton organic carbon demand and respiration rates. Takacs-Vesbach also contributed to the description of the first microbiological study of sub-glacial Lake Vostok. Along with her colleagues, Takacs-Vesbach reported the presence and activity of bacteria associated with the accretion ice >4 km below the surface of the Antarctic polar plateau. This provided evidence that life may exist in inhospitable settings, which opened the possibility that other planetary bodies, such as Europa or Enceladus, may harbor life today. It is only in the past few years that Lake Vostok and other similar subglacial lakes finally have been sampled, confirming the initial findings of Takacs-Vesbach and her colleagues that life can exist in the deep icy subsurface of Antarctica.

Takacs-Vesbach’s Antarctic research focuses on the microbial diversity across various aquatic and soil habitats of the McMurdo Dry Valleys. Her work revealed microbial diversity in this system can be as high as temperate and tropical soils, and although activity is low, it is the highest reported activity per g of soil carbon. Takacs-Vesbach is interested in determining the spatial and temporal variations of microbial diversity, distribution, and function across all major McMurdo Dry Valley habitats, including cryoconites, streams, lakes, and soils.

Alongside teaching as a professor in the Department of Biology, Takacs-Vesbach has also helped lead the Maximizing Access to Research Careers (MARC) program at the University of New Mexico. This program seeks to expose underrepresented students to the biomedical field through special research training to prepare them for future careers in biomedicine.

Takacs-Vesbach was a member of the National Academy of Sciences Committee on the Development of a Strategic Vision for the U.S. Antarctic Program and a member of the U.S. National Committee for the International Polar Year.

== Awards and honors ==
Takacs-Vesbach received the Outstanding Performance in a Doctoral Program Award during 1999 from the Montana State University Foundation, Bozeman. This competition is an annual university-wide competition among doctoral degree students.

In 1995-1999, she received the NASA-Montana Space Grant Fellowship from the Montana Space Grant Consortium, Bozeman. This grant came from a statewide competition offering a full scholarship and stipend for doctoral students, awarded to 2-3 students.

During 1995 and 1996, she received the Leopold Schepp Foundation Scholarship from the Leopold Schepp Foundation which is a national competition that recognizes students based on ability and character.
