= Linda Nedbalová =

Czech Antarctic researcher, phycologist

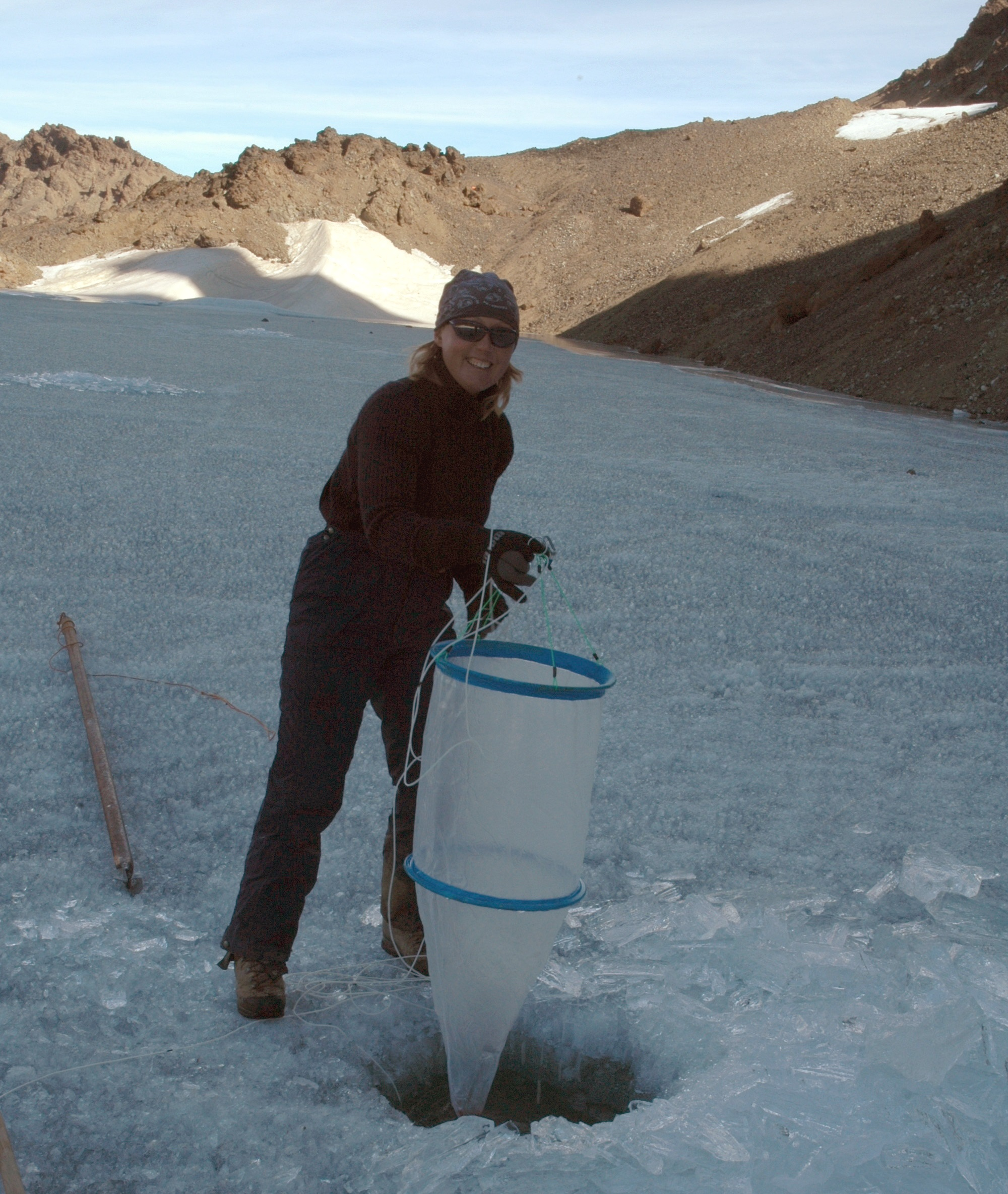
- Linda Nedbalová at James Ross Island
- Born: 1976
- Education: Charles University, Prague.
- Awards: Academy of Sciences of the Czech Republic Award
- Scientific career
- Fields: Cryosphere ecology
- Workplaces: Charles University, Prague
- Website: www.cryoeco.eu/linda-nedbalova

Linda Nedbalová is a Czech Antarctic researcher, best known for her work on snow algae.

== Early life and education ==
Nedbalová was born in 1976 in Prague (Czech Republic). She received her MSc. degree in biology in 2000 from the Faculty of Science, Charles University in Prague. She then received a Ph.D. from the same faculty in 2007. The title of her thesis was 'Phytoplankton in acidified lakes: structure, function and response to ecosystem recovery'.

== Career and impact ==
Nedbalová began her working career as a researcher both at the Institute of Botany of the Czech Academy of Sciences in Třeboň and at the Department of Ecology, Charles University in Prague, where she is now assistant professor. Nedbalová has been involved in polar research since 2008, when she was invited to participate on the expedition to the newly opened Johann Gregor Mendel Czech Antarctic Station on James Ross Island (NE Antarctic Peninsula). In 2011, she was awarded a prestigious award of the Czech Academy of Science for Young scientists for her work on snow algae.

During two consecutive expeditions to Antarctica, she performed (together with Josef Elster) a pioneering limnological survey of the Ulu Peninsula and Clearwater Mesa. Apart from the first characteristics of the lake district, this research yielded (in collaboration with specialists as Bart van de Vijver or Jiří Komárek) important results in taxonomy, ecology, ecophysiology and biogeography of Antarctic cyanobacteria, diatoms and green algae. Recently, she became a member of the Cryosphere Ecology Group formed at the Charles University in Prague.

In addition to her academic research publications, she has also written chapters in monographs, popular science articles, reports from Antarctic expeditions, and lake ecosystems at James Ross Island.

== Awards and honours ==
Nedbalová was awarded the Academy of Sciences of the Czech Republic Award to Young Researchers for Outstanding Achievements in 2011.
