= Mary Odile Cahoon =

American Benedictine nun, biologist and Antarctic scientist

Mary Odile Cahoon OSB (July 21, 1929 – October 2, 2011) was an American Benedictine nun who was among the first women to do research in Antarctica.

In 1974, Mary Odile Cahoon and Mary Alice McWhinnie became the first women scientists to winter over at the main American base in Antarctica, McMurdo Station, with 128 men, although the first woman to be there in the winter was in 1947 and other countries had taken women to Antarctica for some years previously.

== Education, early life, and career ==
Mary Odile Cahoon was born in Houghton, Michigan, on July 21, 1929, as the daughter of William Cahoon and Ruth Smothers. At the Houghton High School, she was named valedictorian of the class of 1947.

She grew up in upper Michigan, and attended private college at the College of St. Scholastica in Duluth. She received her MS degree from DePaul University in Chicago where she worked with McWhinnie. Cahoon held a doctoral degree in Biology from the University of Toronto in Canada (1961) having concentrated her studies in cellular physiology, biochemistry and cytology.

She returned to the College of St. Scholastica to teach, and during the summers, Cahoon continued to do biological work at DePaul University, and at Argonne National Lab. She was invited by McWhinnie to be part of a five-person research team, studying adaptation to cold temperatures in invertebrates and fish. They titled their research project, Metabolic Studies of Cold Resistance of Invertebrates and Fish in Antarctic Waters. After this trip, Cahoon was asked to speak about her experiences at public events, though she never returned to Antarctica.

At The College of St. Scholastica, Cahoon served as department chair, academic dean, and senior vice president, and trustee. She also started the College's study abroad program in Ireland. In addition to her college work, Cahoon was the treasurer for the monastic Benedictine community for over 13 years.

She died suddenly in Duluth at the St. Scholastica Monastery, at the age of 82 on October 2, 2011.
