= Jan Strugnell =

Australian molecular biologist (born 1976)

Jan Maree Strugnell
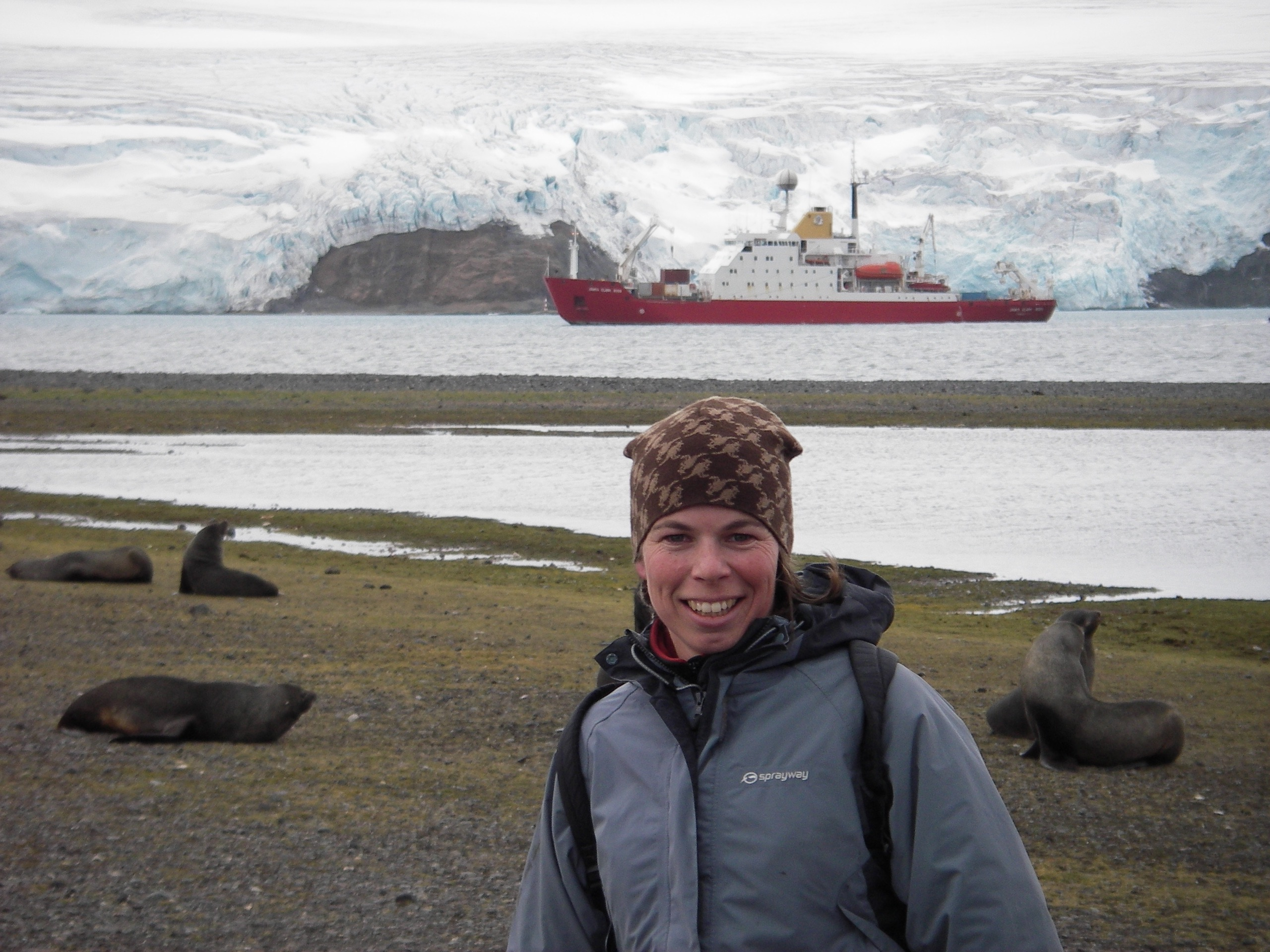
- Jan Strugnell at Carlini Base
- Born: September 14, 1976 (age 49)
- Education: BSc James Cook University; PhD University of Oxford
- Awards: Rhodes Scholarship
- Scientific career
- Workplaces: James Cook University
- Website: Jan Strugnell at JCU

Jan Maree Strugnell is an Australian evolutionary molecular biologist. She is a professor and director in the Centre for Sustainable Tropical Fisheries and Aquaculture at James Cook University, Townsville, Australia. Strugnell's work has investigated population and species level molecular evolution in Antarctic and deep sea species in the context of past geological and climatic change. Strugnell's work also uses genetic tools to help solve bottlenecks in aquaculture and fisheries industries.

== Early life and education ==
Strugnell grew up in Swan Hill in country Victoria, Australia. She attended Swan Hill Secondary College where she was joint dux. Strugnell completed her undergraduate degree (BSc) from James Cook University in Townsville, where she received the University Medal and the Convocation medal. After completing an honours degree in Aquaculture, investigating proximate composition of pearl oyster larvae she received a competitive Rhodes Scholarship to study at Oxford University. She was the first alumnus from James Cook University to be awarded a Rhodes Scholarship.

At Oxford University, Strugnell was a member of Merton College and completed her DPhil within the Department of Zoology. The title of her thesis was The molecular evolutionary history of the Class Cephalopoda (Phylum Mollusca). During this time she represented Oxford University in both cricket and rugby union.

== Career and impact ==
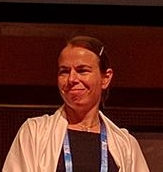
Jan Strugnell at the Scientific Committee on Antarctic Research 2016 Wikibomb

Strugnell completed a postdoc funded by the Antarctic Funding Initiative (AFI) and the National Environment Research Council (NERC) at Queen's University Belfast and the British Antarctic Survey. She subsequently successfully competed for a Lloyd's Tercentenary fellowship and was based in the Department of Zoology at the University of Cambridge from 2008 to 2009. She started as a lecturer in La Trobe University in 2010 and has risen as an associate professor rendering her service in the university until 2016. She is currently at the Centre for Sustainable Tropical Fisheries and Aquaculture at James Cook University, Townsville, Australia, serving as the director and an associate professor.

Strugnell has worked on the genetic basis of resilience and susceptibility to heat stress in commercially valuable abalone and population genomics of rock lobsters both funded by the Australian Research Council. Strugnell was the lead author of a study that discovered that a clade of the world's deep-sea octopuses had their evolutionary origins in the Southern Ocean, demonstrating that the Southern Ocean has been an evolutionary source of taxa for other ocean basins. This study was the first to quantify this link between Southern Ocean and deep sea taxa using genetic analyses. This study estimated that the deep-sea clade of octopods diverged from the Southern Ocean clade more than 30 mya when Antarctica cooled and the global thermohaline circulation strengthened. This provided similar conditions in the deep sea (cold, nutrient and oxygen rich) to that in the Southern Ocean enabling the octopods to colonise this environment and diversify.

In addition, Strugnell's work on Southern Ocean octopods detected genetic signatures between Ross Sea and Weddell Seas populations despite them being separated by 10,000 km of land. This signature provides evidence for a historic seaway across Antarctica which forms during the collapse of the West Antarctic ice shelf.

Strugnell's contributions include editorial work for Molecular Phylogenetics and Evolution. She is currently the co-chair of the Scientific Committee on Antarctic Research research program 'State of the Antarctic Ecosystem' (AntEco) and is on the National Committee for Antarctic Research in Australia. In August 2016, Strugnell received considerable media attention in Australia as coordinator of the scientific committee's Wikibomb event, designed to provide better coverage of female Antarctic scientists. Under her leadership, over 100 biographies of women in Antarctic science were completed and are now posted on Wikipedia. They are all included in the Wikipedia List of Antarctic women.

== Awards and honors ==
- Australian Research Council (ARC) Discovery Grant – Lost at sea? Understanding adaptation and dispersal in spiny lobsters (2015–2017)
- Australian Research Council (ARC) Discovery Grant – Stress transcriptomics: development of tests to reduce the incidence of summer mortality in abalone (2011 to 2013)
- Australia and Pacific Science Foundation grant – Gene flow, adaptation and speciation in Antarctic octopus: consequences of climate change ( 2010 to 2011)
- Outstanding Alumnus Award, James Cook University (2010)
- Prize for the best scientific paper on cephalopod research published between 2006 and 2009 (2009)
- Rhodes Scholarship (2000)
- The University Medal, James Cook University (1999)
- The Convocation Medal (1997)
