= Balloon debate =

Form of competitive debate

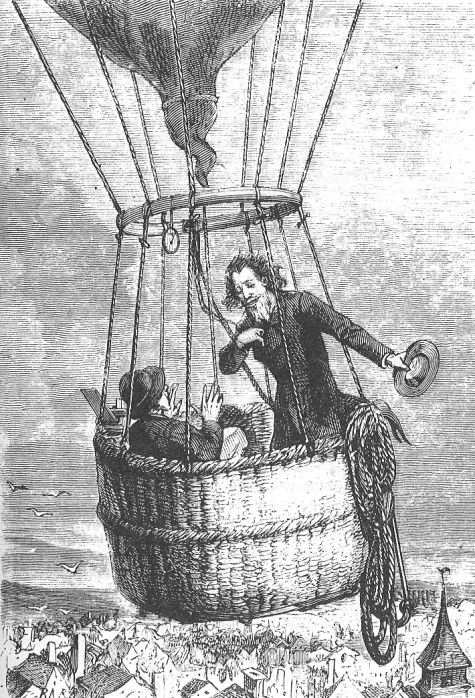
In a balloon debate, speakers must argue their case for not being thrown out of a hot-air balloon

A balloon debate is a debate in which a number of speakers attempt to win the approval of an audience. The audience is invited to imagine that the speakers are flying in a hot-air balloon which is sinking and that someone must be thrown out if everyone is not to die.

Each speaker has to make the case why they should not be thrown out of the balloon to save the remainder. Typically, each participant speaks on behalf of a famous person, profession, fictional character, etc. Other perilous situations may take the place of the sinking balloon, for example, a shipwrecked raft, or a nuclear bunker.

It is often used to build argumentative skills in preparation for speech and debate activities such as public forum, policy debate and Lincoln-Douglas.

The balloon debate style appears in the Big Brother reality television series where contestants vote each week on who leaves the show, each arguing their own case to the group.

== See also ==
- Lifeboat ethics
- Storytelling game
