= Ji Hee Kim =

South Korean Antarctic scientist

- Education: BSc Mokpo National University; PhD Seoul National University
- Awards: KOPRI Medal (2005 & 2010); Ministerial Award of Land Transport and Maritime Affairs (2012)
- Scientific career
- Workplaces: Korean Polar Research Institute (KOPRI)

Korean name
- Hangul: 김지희
- RR: Gim Jihui
- MR: Kim Chihŭi

Ji Hee Kim is a South Korean Antarctic researcher, best known for being the Principal Investigator for comprehensive environmental monitoring and construction of the long term environmental database at South Korea's King Sejong Station.

== Early life and education ==
Kim received her BSc in biology at Mokpo National University in 1991 and her MSc in biology at Seoul National University in 1993, and a PhD at the same university in 2000. She started her research work at the Korea Polar Research Institute (KOPRI) in 1998 before she completed her PhD. She has been a key member of the polar ecology laboratory at KOPRI.

== Career and impact ==
Kim has led many projects at KOPRI, particularly after the construction of Jang Bogo Station, South Korea's second Antarctic research station. Kim was a key member of the expedition team searching for the proper site and later Principal Investigator for the preparation for the Comprehensive Environmental Evaluation. She is the Principal Investigator for comprehensive environmental monitoring and construction of a long term environmental database in the King Sejong Station.

== Awards and honours ==
Kim was awarded a KOPRI medal in 2005 and 2010. She was also awarded the Ministerial Award of Land Transport and Maritime Affairs in 2012.

== Selected works ==
- Y-J Jung, Y M Lee, K Baek, C Y Hwang, Y Cho, S G Hong, J H Kim, H K Lee 2015. Algibacter psychrophilus sp. nov., a psychrophilic bacterium isolated from marine sediment. International Journal of Systematic and Evolutionary Microbiology 65(6) 1735-1740.
- K Baek, Y M Lee, C Y Hwang, H Park, Y-J Jung, M-K Kim, S G Hong, J H Kim, H K Lee. 2015. Psychroserpens janbogonensis sp. nov., apsychrophilic bacterium isolated from Antarctic marine sediment. International Journal of Systematic and Evolutionary Microbiology. 65(1): 183-188.
- M Kim, A Cho, H S Lim, S G Hong, J H Kim, J Lee, T Choi, T S Ahn, O-S Kim. 2015. Highly heterogeneous soil bacterial communities around Terra Nova Bay of Northern Victoria Land, Antarctica. PLoS ONE
- J.H. Kim, M.D. Guiry, J.-H. Ok, H. Chung, H.-G. Choi. 2008. Phylogenetic relationships within the tribe Janieae (Corallinales, Rhodophyta) based on molecular and morphological data: A reappraisal of Jania. Journal of Phycology Vol. 43. 1310-1319.
- J.H. Kim, I.-Y. Ahn, K.S. Lee, H. Chung, H.-G. Choi. 2007. Vegetation of Barton Peninsula in the neighbourhood of King Sejong Station (King George Island, maritime Antarctic). Polar Biology 30, 903-916.
- H.W. Seo, J.Y. Kee, Y.E. Park, S.-H. Kang, H. Chung, & J.H. Kim. 2006. Multiple Shoot Induction from Radicle-derived Callus and in Vitro propagation of Silene Acaulis Subsp. arctica. Plant Biotechnology society. 33(4), 303-307.
- J.H. Kim et al. 2006. Lichen flora around the Korean Antarctic scientific station, King George Island, Antarctic. Microbiology. Vol. 30, 903-916.
