= Sophie Warny =

Belgian Antarctic researcher

- Born: 1969 (age 56–57)
- Education: UCLouvain
- Scientific career
- Fields: Polar palynology Palaeobotany
- Workplaces: Louisiana State University
- Website: www.geol.lsu.edu/warny

Sophie Warny (born 1969) is a Belgian Antarctic researcher, best known for her work on palynology. As an associate professor at Louisiana State University in the Department of Geology and Geophysics and one of the curators at the Museum of Natural Science, Warny studies past climate change patterns by examining fossilized pollen and spores. She is currently the vice president of the Gulf Coast Section of the Society for Sedimentary Geology (GCSSEPM).

== Early life and education ==
Warny was educated at the University of Louvain (UCLouvain) where she earned a BS and a PhD in Marine Geology and Micropaleontology; and at the Université de Liège where she earned a DEA in Oceanography.

== Career and impact ==
After completing her Ph.D., Warny came to the U.S. where she held a joint appointed as assistant professor of research at Louisiana State University and education director at the Louisiana Museum of Natural Science. In 2008–2014 she was appointed assistant professor and in 2014 promoted to associate professor. She has continued her involvement with the Natural Science Museum, where she currently serves as one of the curators for the museum.

Warny is a palynologists/paleobotanist and has played a key role in expanding our understanding of Antarctic climate evolution. Working with the Antarctic Offshore Stratigraphy (ANTOSTRAT) team, she provided evidence for Antarctica having experienced significant warming during the mid-Miocene, when land temperatures reached 10 °C, and that liquid precipitation was notably higher at that time. Later, working with SHALDRIL cores she established compelling evidence that the Antarctic Peninsula lagged the rest of the continent by several million years in its transition into polar conditions. In recent years her research has reached further back in geological time to include the warm Eocene and Oligocene, providing new insights into how Antarctica transitioned from Greenhouse to Icehouse conditions.

Warny worked with Sarah J. Feakins, partnering with NASA, in Antarctica and focused on looking for marine sediment as they are "ideal to look for clues of past vegetation, as the fossils deposited are protected from ice sheet advances, but these are technically very difficult to acquire in the Antarctic and require international collaboration." (Warny). Her findings of (discovering fossils and algae on the seafloor) along with others that she worked with in this project represented that there were summer temperatures in Antarctica 15-20 million years prior.

Throughout her career, Warny has remained heavily engaged in public education through her involvement with the LSU Museum of Natural Science. She has helped to design exhibits that have received national recognition. She has also played a key role in establishing new techniques in forensic palynology that have been used nationally. One of her greatest contributions was as a key player in the highly successful Polar Palooza program.

In addition to conducting paleoenvironmental research in Antarctica, she is also working on sections in the Mediterranean Sea (her doctoral focus), in the Gulf of Mexico, in Canada, in Tanzania, and in Papua New Guinea via doctoral student projects and collaborations. To this date, she has advised 15 MS and PhD projects.

== Awards and honors ==
Warny was awarded the AASP Graduate Student Award in 1996, a UCL Dissertation Award in 1999, a NSF CAREER Award in 2011, and the LSU Rising Faculty Research Award in 2014.

Warny was nominated as one of the six 2018–2019 AAPG Distinguished Lecturers. AAPG, the American Association of Petroleum Geologists is an international organization with over 38000 members in 100-plus countries.

In 2023, Warny was awarded Fellow of the American Association for the Advancement of Science.

== Selected works ==
- Levy, Richard; Harwood, David; Florindo, Fabio; Sangiorgi, Francesca; Tripati, Robert; von Eynatten, Hilmar; Gasson, Edward; Kuhn, Gerhard; Tripati, Aradhna; DeConto, Robert; Fielding, Christopher; Field, Brad; Golledge, Nicholas; McKay, Robert; Naish, Timothy; Olney, Matthew; Pollard, David; Schouten, Stefan; Talarico, Franco; Warny, Sophie; Willmott, Veronica; Acton, Gary; Panter, Kurt; Paulsen, Timothy; Taviani, Marco (2016). "Antarctic ice sheet sensitivity to atmospheric CO2variations in the early to mid-Miocene" (PDF). Proceedings of the National Academy of Sciences. 113 (13): 3453–3458. Bibcode:2016PNAS..113.3453L. doi:10.1073/pnas.1516030113. ISSN 0027-8424. PMC 4822588. PMID 26903644.
- Griener, Kathryn W.; Warny, Sophie; Askin, Rosemary; Acton, Gary (2015). "Early to middle Miocene vegetation history of Antarctica supports eccentricity-paced warming intervals during the Antarctic icehouse phase". Global and Planetary Change. 127: 67–78. Bibcode:2015GPC...127...67G. doi:10.1016/j.gloplacha.2015.01.006. ISSN 0921-8181.
- Warny, S. (2013). "Museums' Role: Pollen and Forensic Science". Science. 339 (6124): 1149. Bibcode:2013Sci...339.1149W. doi:10.1126/science.339.6124.1149-a. ISSN 0036-8075. PMID 23471387.
- Griener, Kathryn W.; Nelson, David M.; Warny, Sophie (2013). "Declining moisture availability on the Antarctic Peninsula during the Late Eocene". Palaeogeography, Palaeoclimatology, Palaeoecology. 383–384: 72–78. Bibcode:2013PPP...383...72G. doi:10.1016/j.palaeo.2013.05.004. ISSN 0031-0182.
- Feakins, Sarah J.; Warny, Sophie; Lee, Jung-Eun (2012). "Hydrologic cycling over Antarctica during the middle Miocene warming". Nature Geoscience. 5 (8): 557–560. Bibcode:2012NatGe...5..557F. doi:10.1038/ngeo1498. ISSN 1752-0894.
- Anderson, J. B.; Warny, S.; Askin, R. A.; Wellner, J. S.; Bohaty, S. M.; Kirshner, A. E.; Livsey, D. N.; Simms, A. R.; Smith, T. R.; Ehrmann, W.; Lawver, L. A.; Barbeau, D.; Wise, S. W.; Kulhanek, D. K.; Weaver, F. M.; Majewski, W. (2011). "Progressive Cenozoic cooling and the demise of Antarctica's last refugium". Proceedings of the National Academy of Sciences. 108 (28): 11356–11360. Bibcode:2011PNAS..10811356A. doi:10.1073/pnas.1014885108. ISSN 0027-8424. PMC 3136253. PMID 21709269.
- Warny, S.; Askin, R. A.; Hannah, M. J.; Mohr, B. A.R.; Raine, J. I.; Harwood, D. M.; Florindo, F. (2009). "Palynomorphs from a sediment core reveal a sudden remarkably warm Antarctica during the middle Miocene". Geology. 37 (10): 955–958. Bibcode:2009Geo....37..955W. doi:10.1130/G30139A.1. ISSN 0091-7613.
