= Katrin Linse =

British zoologist

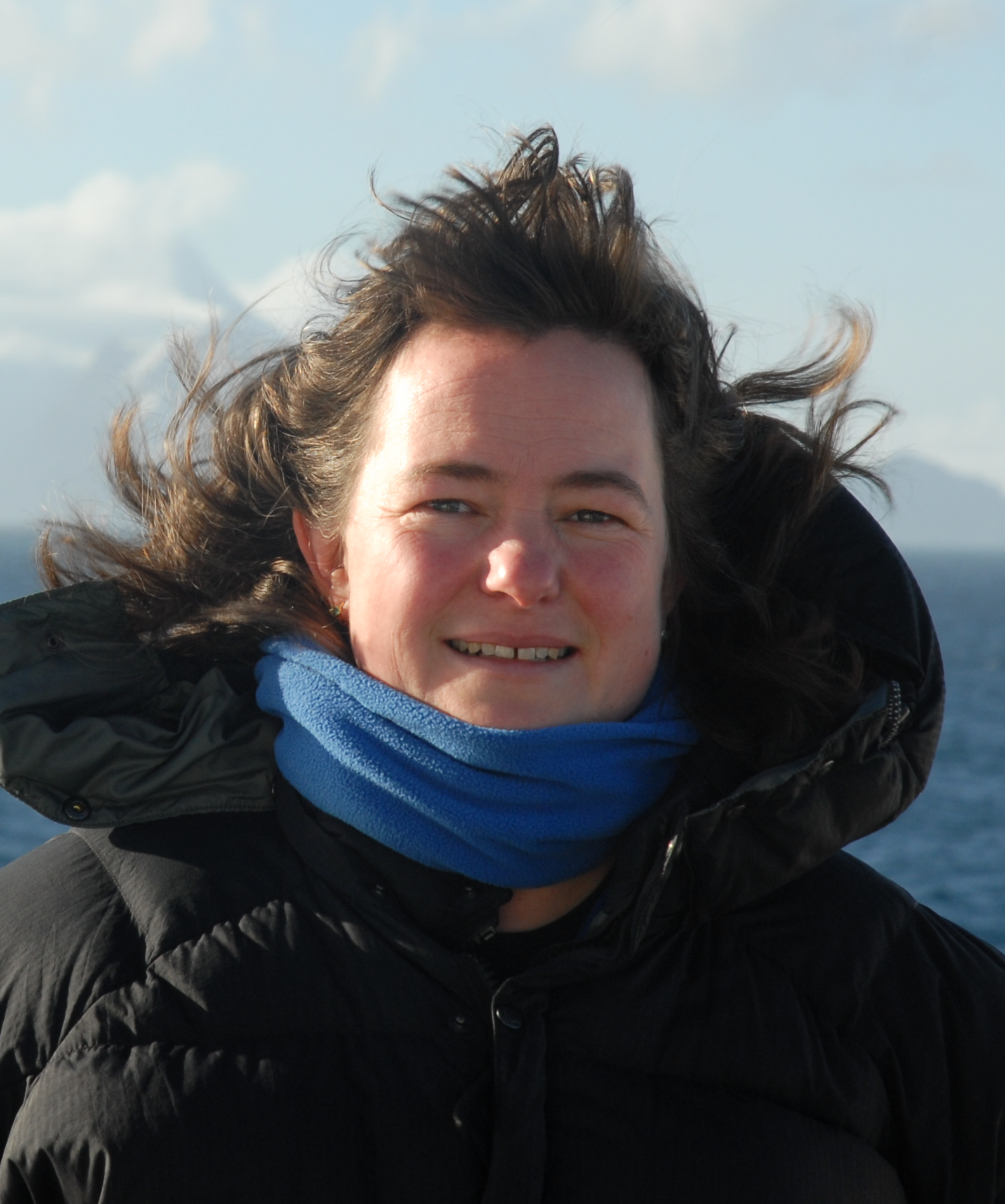
- Linse aboard the RRS James Cook
- Education: University of Hamburg
- Scientific career
- Fields: Marine biology
- Workplaces: British Antarctic Survey
- Website: Katrin Linse at the British Antarctic Survey

Katrin Linse is a German marine biologist, best known for her work on discovering new Antarctic and deep sea species.

== Early life and education ==
Linse was born in Germany. She discovered marine biology at the age of six, thanks to undergraduates she encountered while on holiday with her family. She developed the goal of working in polar science at the age of twelve, when a national polar research vessel was being built in a shipyard near to her family home: forbidden from visiting the shipyard during its open day, a were all women and children, Linse announced that one day she would sail aboard the ship to study marine life in the Antarctic. At the age of twenty-six, she did so for the first time.

Linse received her undergraduate degree with magna cum laude honors from Kiel University, where she also completed her master's degree. She completed her PhD at the University of Hamburg and the Zoology Museum, where she compared molluscs collected from the tip of South America with those found in Antarctica.

== Career and impact ==
Linse is a Senior Biodiversity Biologist at the British Antarctic Survey, where she began her career in 2001. She is a distinguished marine benthic biologist with over fifteen years’ research experience in the biodiversity, phylogeography and evolution of Antarctic marine invertebrates. She has participated in over 13 ship-based expeditions, including several that studied hydrothermal habitats in the Southern Ocean and numerous that have impacted global knowledge of the Southern Ocean and Antarctica. She has led or contributed to the discovery of dozens of new species, as she works toward what she has referred to as a “census of marine life in the Southern Ocean.”

Among Linse's contributions to Antarctic science is her work leading the team that designed the first georeferenced Antarctic benthos database, which resulted in new Antarctic provinces and an updated biogeography for the Southern Ocean. Her research on phylogenetic relationships of current Antarctic species and their evolutionary histories contributed to the discovery of high biodiversity in the bathyal and abyssal Antarctic deep sea, and influenced the discovery of the first hydrothermal vents in the Southern Ocean. She also has led or contributed to numerous teams that discovered new species, including a new family of deep-sea starfish living in the warm waters around a hydrothermal vent in the East Scotia Ridge in the Southern Ocean; a new species of bug (Jaera tyleri), similar in appearance to the common woodlouse, which was found plastered all over a whale carcass on the floor of the deep Southern Ocean; and more than thirty new species of marine life discovered during an expedition to the Amundsen Sea off Pine Island Bay in Antarctica. She also was part of the BAS team that made the first comprehensive “inventory” of sea and land animals around a group of Antarctic islands, South Orkney Islands, near the tip of the Antarctic Peninsula.

== Selected works ==
- Connolly SR, MacNeil MA, Caley MA, Cripps E, Hisano M, Thibaut LM, Bhattacharya BD, Benedetti-Cecchi L, Brainard RE, Brandt A, Bulleri F, Kaiser S, Knowlton N, Kroncke I, Linse K, Maggi E, D. O’Hara T, Plaisance L, Poore GCB, Sarkar SK, Satpathy KK, Schückel U, Sogin ML, Stocks KI, Williams A, Wilson RS, Zettler LA (2014) Commonness and rarity in the marine biosphere. PNAS
- Angelika Brandt, Andrew J Gooday, Simone N Brandao, Saskia Brix, Wiebke Brökeland, Tomas Cedhagen, Madhumita Choudhury, Nils Cornelius, Bruno Danis, Ilse De Mesel, Robert J Diaz, David C Gillan, Brigitte Ebbe, John A Howe, Dorte Janussen, Stefanie Kaiser, Katrin Linse, Marina Malyutina, Jan Pawlowski, Michael Raupach, Ann Vanreusel First insights into the biodiversity and biogeography of the Southern Ocean deep sea Nature 447 (7142), 307-311
- Katrin Linse, Huw J Griffiths, David KA Barnes, Andrew Clarke 2006 Biodiversity and biogeography of Antarctic and sub-Antarctic mollusca Deep-Sea Research Part II: Topical Studies in Oceanography 53: 8, 985-1008
- Huw J Griffiths, David KA Barnes, Katrin Linse (2009) Towards a generalized biogeography of the Southern Ocean benthos Journal of Biogeography 36(1): 162-177
