= Hannah McKeand =

British explorer (born 1973)

- Born: June 22, 1973 (age 53); Bristol, England
- Education: University of Wales
- Occupation: Polar guide
- Known for: Antarctic solo exploration
- Website: http://hannahmckeand.com

Hannah McKeand is an English polar explorer. In 2006 she set the record for the fastest journey (man or woman) to the South Pole, a 600-nautical-mile (1,100 km) journey she completed solo in just 39 days, 9 hours, and 33 minutes. The record was broken in 2008 by Todd Carmichael of Spokane, Washington, United States. In March 2008 she attempted to reach the North Pole alone and unsupported but had to abandon the trip after falling through the ice and badly damaging her shoulder and back. McKeand is a public speaker and polar consultant.

== Early life ==
McKeand was born in Bristol. Her mother Julian Burbury was an actress and her father Ian McKeand was a theatre director and now teaches at Newark College. Until she was 6 the family lived in St Andrews, Scotland where her father ran the Byre Theatre. Next the family moved to the north coast of Somerset where she spent the rest of her childhood. She attended St Audries School, and the Richard Huish College and took two years out before university to work with FEI carriage horses. She attended the University of Wales Lampeter and achieved a degree in Classics.

== Early career ==
Her first job was a statistician for the Automobile Association, which she left after 3 years to pursue a career in theatre. She was the marketing manager, then head of touring for the Watermill Theatre in Newbury, Berkshire and the all-male Shakespeare company Propeller for nearly 10 years. In 2004 she first skied to the South Pole and in 2005 gave up her job in theatre to sail around the world in the Clipper Round the World Yacht Race and ski solo to the South Pole.

== Achievements ==
- 2006 Guinness World Record, fastest person to ski solo and unsupported from the coast of Antarctica to the South Pole. Held for four years, the fastest woman until 2016.
- 2008 Became a Fellow of the Royal Geographical Society
- 2009 Invited to present the Gold Duke of Edinburgh awards at St James' Palace and meet His Royal Highness Prince Philip
- 2010 Invited to a reception at 10 Downing Street for the Mark Evison Foundation with Prime Minister Gordon Brown
- 2010 Completed more South Pole expeditions than anyone in history
- 2010 Invited to join the Explorers Club
- 2016 Association of Independent Tour Operators (AITO) Travel Writer of the Year (over 1,500 words), second place
- 2018 AITO Travel Writer of the Year (under 1,500 words), first place
