= Johanna Davidsson =

Swedish nurse and adventurer (born 1983)

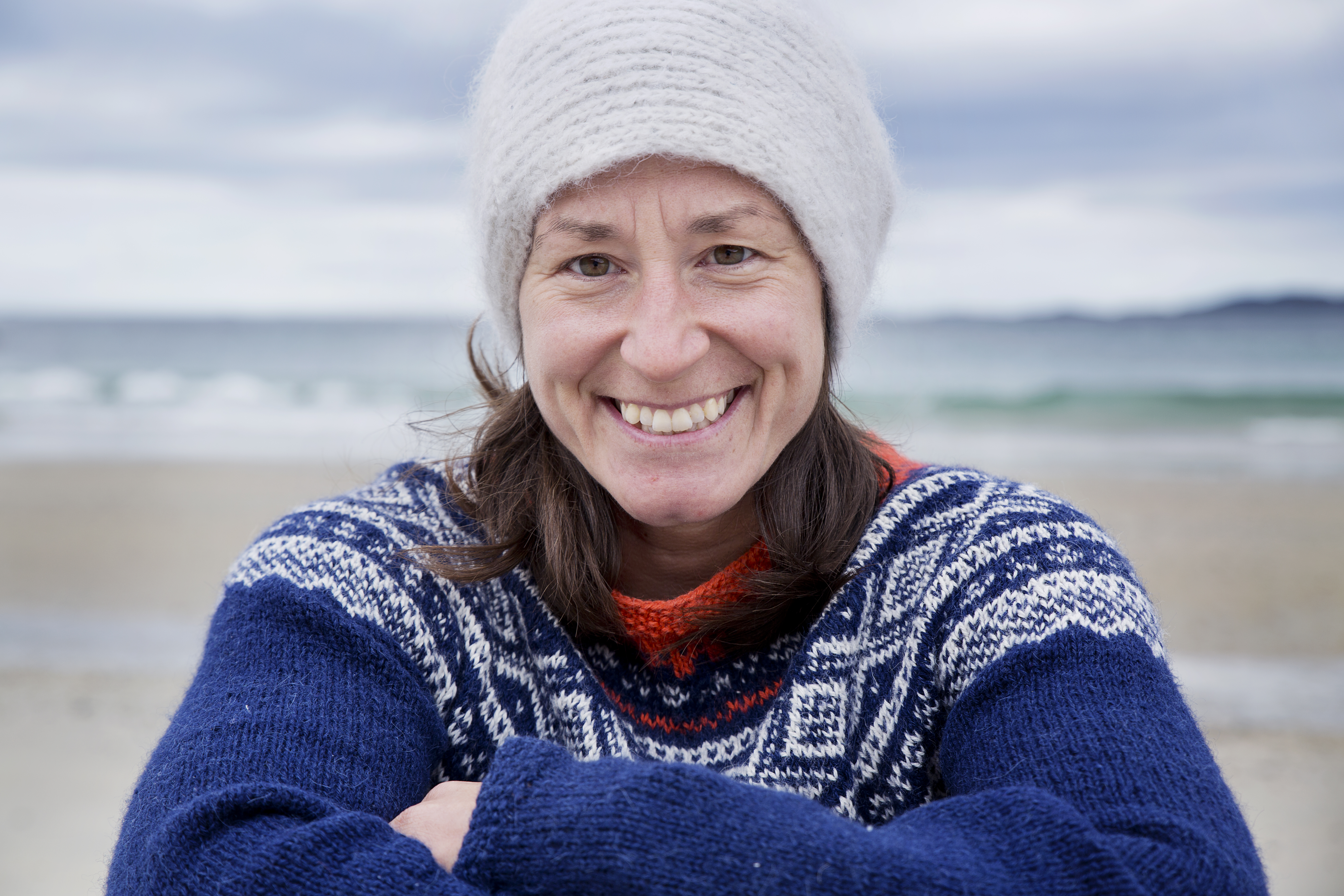
Image of Johanna Davidsson

Johanna Davidsson (born 11 December 1983) is a Swedish nurse and adventurer. She is the Guinness World Record holder for skiing solo, unsupported from the coast of Antarctica to the South Pole.

She is a nurse at Tromsø Legevakt medical center and an accomplished adventurer.

She started her world record journey on 15 November 2016 and skied for seven hours a day for 38 days, ending on 24 December 2016. The journey took her 38 days, 23 hours and five minutes to get to the South Pole and the Amundsen-Scott South Pole Station. She beat the previous record by nine hours.

In 2016 she received the Swedish Award for Female Adventurer of the Year and in 2017 she received The Shackleton Award for her trip to the South Pole.
