= Secretariat of the Antarctic Treaty =

Organization

- Formation: 1 September 2004
- Headquarters: Buenos Aires, Argentina
- Members: Parties to the Antarctic Treaty System
- Official language: English, French, Russian, and Spanish
- Executive Secretary: Albert Lluberas
- Staff: 9
- Website: www.ats.aq

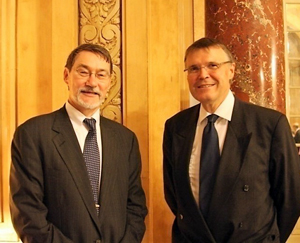
Johannes Huber (left) and Manfred Reinke (right)

The Antarctic Treaty Secretariat (ATS) is a subsidiary body of the Antarctic Treaty Consultative Meeting (ATCM) and, as such, performs its duties under the ATCM's direction. The ATCM is the forum that brings together the Antarctic Treaty Consultative Parties, Non-Consultative Parties, Observers and Experts. The Antarctic Treaty was signed in 1959 and entered into force in 1961.

The Secretariat is located at 757 Maipú Street, in the Autonomous City of Buenos Aires, Argentina. The government of Argentina provides the office where the Secretariat operates, and the Headquarters Agreement –signed in 2010, during ATCM XXXIII—establishes the relationship between the ATCM and the Argentine Republic regarding the operations of the Secretariat in Argentina.

== Mission ==
The mission of the Secretariat is to assist the ATCM and the Committee for Environmental Protection (CEP) in performing their functions, with the aim of strengthening the Antarctic Treaty System and ensuring that all activities carried out in Antarctica are consistent with the purposes and principles of the Antarctic Treaty and its Protocol on Environmental Protection.

== Functions ==
Under the direction and supervision of the ATCM, the Secretariat performs the tasks specified in Measure 1 (2003), which can be summarized as follows:

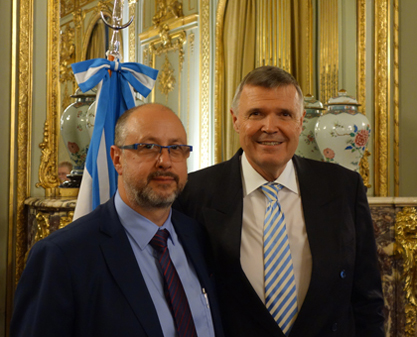
Albert Lluberas Bonaba (left) and Manfred Reinke (right)

- provide support for the annual Antarctic Treaty Consultative Meeting (ATCM) and the Committee for Environmental Protection (CEP) meeting;
- facilitate the exchange of information amongst Parties on all required exchanges under the Antarctic Treaty and the Protocol;
- compile, store, archive and make available all ATCM-related documents;
- facilitate and disseminate information about the Antarctic Treaty System and activities in Antarctica.

== Executive Secretary ==
The Secretariat is headed by an Executive Secretary appointed by the ATCM from candidates who are nationals of Consultative Parties. The mandate extends for four years, with the possibility of being re-elected for a second term.

The first Executive Secretary, elected in 2004, was Mr Johannes Huber from the Netherlands. From 2009 to 2017 (two terms) the ATCM entrusted the position to Dr Manfred Reinke (Germany). At ATCM XL (Beijing, 2017), Mr Albert Lluberas Bonaba (Uruguay) was appointed. Mr Lluberas Bonaba was re-elected in 2021 and has a mandate until 2025.

== Structure ==
The Secretariat operates cost-effectively. It includes the Executive Secretary and other staff members selected by him/her. The Secretariat currently consists of the Executive Secretary, the Deputy Executive Secretary and eight members in the general staff category, who serve under the procedures, terms and conditions set out in the Staff Regulations.

== Financing ==
The Secretariat and the work it carries out are financed by contributions from the Consultative Parties. Half of the budget comes from contributions from the Consultative Parties in equal parts, while the other half comes from the contributions that the Consultative Parties make, based on the scale of their national activities in Antarctica and taking into account the payment capacity of each of them. Any Contracting Party (Consultative or Non-Consultative) may also make voluntary contributions at any time.

The budget of the Secretariat must be approved by the representatives of all the Consultative Parties present annually at the ATCM.

== Historical background ==
During its first thirty years of existence, until 1991, the Antarctic Treaty operated based on a non-permanent secretariat, which rotated in parallel with the organization of the Antarctic Treaty Consultative Meetings (ATCM). Thus, administrative matters were handled by the host country of the next ATCM, at the end of the previous meeting. With the adoption of the Madrid Protocol, which added a series of organizational and coordination issues, the need to create a permanent Secretariat for the Antarctic Treaty became evident.

During ATCM XVII (Venice, 1992) a consensus was reached on the need to establish a Secretariat to help the ATCM and the future Committee for Environmental Protection (CEP), created by the Madrid Protocol, to carry out their functions. At that same Meeting, Argentina proposed Buenos Aires as the headquarters of the permanent Secretariat, while the United States proposed Washington D.C.

For several years thereafter, the ATCM debated the geographical location of the future Secretariat. At ATCM XXII (Tromsø, 1998) Australia proposed the city of Hobart, but at ATCM XXIII (Lima, 1999) a large majority of Consultative Parties had expressed their support for the Argentine capital city. Eventually, at ATCM XXIV (Saint Petersburg, 2001) Parties reached a consensus to establish the Secretariat in Buenos Aires.

The basic guidelines and the budget forecasts for the Secretariat were drawn up at the XXV and XXVI ATCMs (Warsaw, 2002 and Madrid, 2003, respectively). The specific functions of the Secretariat are included in Measure 1 (2003). The first Executive Secretary was elected during ATCM XXVII (Cape Town, 2004) and the Secretariat started operating on 1 September 2004.

== List of Executive Secretaries ==
No.	Secretary	Term start	Term end	Country
1	Johannes "Jan" Huber (b. 1947)	1 September 2004	31 August 2009	Netherlands
2	Manfred Reinke (b. 1952)	1 September 2009	31 August 2017	Germany
3	Albert Alexander Lluberas Bonaba	1 September 2017	31 August 2025	Uruguay
4	Francisco Javier Berguño Hurtado	1 September 2025	Present	Chile

== See also ==
- International Seabed Authority
- United Nations Office for Outer Space Affairs
