= APA =

APA most often refers to:

- American Psychological Association
  - APA style, a writing style guide from the American Psychological Association

APA or Apa may also refer to:

== Entertainment and media ==
- Acolytes Protection Agency, a professional wrestling tag-team
- Agency for the Performing Arts, a talent and literary agency
- Father (1966 film) (Hungarian: Apa)

== Government and politics ==
- Administrative Procedure Act, a statute controlling administrative agencies of the federal government of the United States
- Administrative Procedure Act (Switzerland)
- Advance pricing agreement
- Agência Portuguesa do Ambiente (APA, English: Portuguese Environment Agency)
- Approved Publication Arrangement
- Accredited parliamentary assistant to a Member of the European Parliament

== Language ==
- Americanist phonetic notation or the American phonetic alphabet
- Southern Athabaskan languages excluding Navajo (ISO 639 code: apa)

== Organizations and businesses ==
=== Australia ===
- APA Group (Australia), electricity generation and gas pipeline company
- Aborigines Progressive Association
- Australian Parkour Association
- Australian Progressive Alliance

=== Japan ===
- Japan Advertising Photographers' Association
- APA Group (Japan), a Japanese hotel chain

=== United Kingdom ===
- All Peoples' Association (1930–1936), a British organisation for international amity
- Army Prosecuting Authority, former government body
- Association of Publishing Agencies

=== United States ===
- APA – The Engineered Wood Association, formerly the American Plywood Association
- APA Corporation, an energy company
- A-P-A Transport Corp., New Jersey
- Adirondack Park Agency, New York
- Agency for the Performing Arts, a talent and literary agency
- Allied Pilots Association, a labor union for American Airlines pilots
- American Payroll Association
- American Philological Association, devoted to Greek and Roman civilization
- American Philosophical Association
- American Planning Association, representing the field of city and regional planning
- American Polygraph Association
- American Poolplayers Association
- American Poultry Association
- American Protective Association, a former anti-Catholic organization
- American Psychiatric Association
- American Psychological Association
- Anglican Province of America, a church
- Austin Peace Academy, an Islamic school in Texas

=== Elsewhere ===
- Asian Pickleball Association
- Association of Panamerican Athletics
- Austria Press Agency (German: Austria Presse Agentur)
- Azerbaijan Press Agency
- NSDAP Office of Foreign Affairs (Außenpolitisches Amt der NSDAP), a Nazi Party organization
- Peruvian Astronomy Association (Spanish: Asociación Peruana de Astronomía), in Peru

== People ==
- Apa (footballer) (born 2000), Spanish footballer
- Apa of Slavonia, 12th-century Hungarian noble
- Apa Sherpa, a Nepali Sherpa and famous Mt. Everest mountaineer
- KJ Apa (born 1997), New Zealand actor

== Places ==
=== Asia ===
- Apa, Acıpayam
- Upu, a historic region surrounding Damascus (alternative transliteration)
- The Hong Kong Academy for Performing Arts

=== North America ===
- Apache Railway, Arizona, U.S. (by reporting mark)
- Anderson Preparatory Academy, a school in Indiana, United States
- Centennial Airport, Colorado, United States (by IATA code)

=== Other places ===
- Antarctic Protected Area, several types of zone on Antarctica
- Apa, Benue, a local government area in Benue State, Nigeria
- Apa, Lagos, a locality in Lagos State, Nigeria
- Apa River, frontier between Brazil and Paraguay
- Apa, Satu Mare, a commune in Romania

== Maritime ==
- Apa (ship), an Amazonas-class corvette of the Brazilian Navy
- Advance provisioning allowance
- A retired US Navy hull classification symbol: Attack transport (APA)

== Science and technology ==
- Aldosterone-producing adenoma
- All points addressable
- Amplified piezoelectric actuator
- Atypical polypoid adenomyoma
- Apa, a type of Bronze Age sword named after the Romanian village

== Other uses ==
- Apa, Coptic form of Ab (Semitic)
- Amateur press association, any group of people who self-publish material among themselves
- American pale ale
- Antarctic Protected Area, several types of place on Antarctica
- Asian Pacific American
- Asset purchase agreement
- Australian Postgraduate Awards
