= Associations Incorporation Act 1981 =

Associations Incorporation Act 1981 may refer to:

- Associations Incorporation Act 1981 (Queensland)
- Associations Incorporation Act 1981 (Victoria)
