= Associations Incorporation Act =

Associations Incorporation Act may refer to:

- Associations Incorporation Act 1981 (Queensland)
- Associations Incorporation Act 1981 (Victoria)
- Associations Incorporation Act (New South Wales) (1984)
- Associations Incorporation Act (South Australia) (1985)
