= Administrative Procedure Act (disambiguation) =

The Administrative Procedure Act is a statute in the United States that provides a general framework for judicial review of federal agency actions.

Administrative Procedure Act may also refer to:

- Administrative Procedure Act (Japan)
- Administrative Procedure Act (Switzerland)
