= List of acts of the Parliament of Victoria from 1982 =

This is a list of acts of the Parliament of Victoria, Australia for the year 1982.

== 1982 ==
Short title, or popular name	Citation	Royal assent
Long title
Tattersall Consultations (Amendment) Act 1981 (Note: Although the short title of this act ends "... Act 1981", it was passed in the year 1982.) (repealed)	No. 9682	5 January 1982
An Act to amend the Tattersall Consultations Act 1958 (Note: Tattersall Consultations Act 1958 (No. 6390)) with respect to the Sale of Tickets to Minors and for other purposes. (Repealed by Statute Law Revision Act 1995 (No. 11 of 1995))
Workers Compensation (Actions) Act 1981 (repealed)	No. 9683	5 January 1982
An Act to amend the Workers Compensation Act 1958 (Note: Workers Compensation Act 1958 (No. 6419)) in relation to Proceedings under the Act and at Common Law and for other purposes. (Repealed by Statute Law Revision Act 1995 (No. 11 of 1995))
Pensioners Rates Remission Act 1981 (repealed)	No. 9684	5 January 1982
An Act to make further provision with respect to the payment of certain Rates and Charges, to amend the Geelong Waterworks and Sewerage Act 1958, (Note: Geelong Waterworks and Sewerage Act 1958 (No. 6263)) the Local Government Act 1958, (Note: Local Government Act 1958 (No. 6299)) the Melbourne and Metropolitan Board of Works Act 1958, (Note: Melbourne and Metropolitan Board of Works Act 1958 (No. 6310)) the Mildura Irrigation and Water Trusts Act 1958, (Note: Mildura Irrigation and Water Trusts Act 1958 (No. 6316)) the Sewerage Districts Act 1958 (Note: Sewerage Districts Act 1958 (No. 6368)) and the Water Act 1958 (Note: Water Act 1958 (No. 6413)) and for other purposes. (Repealed by Statute Law Revision Act 1995 (No. 11 of 1995))
Superannuation Benefits Act 1981 (repealed)	No. 9685	5 January 1982
An Act to make Provision with respect to Retirement Benefits for certain Contributors who are Retrenched, to amend the Superannuation Benefits Act 1977 (Note: Superannuation Benefits Act 1977 (No. 9017)) and for other purposes. (Repealed by Statute Law Revision Act 1995 (No. 11 of 1995))
Water and Sewerage Authorities (Financial) Act 1981	No. 9686	5 January 1982
An Act to amend the Water Act 1958, the Sewerage Districts Act 1958, the Latrobe Valley Act 1958, (Note: Latrobe Valley Act 1958 (No. 6290)) the Geelong Waterworks and Sewerage Act 1958, the Mildura Irrigation and Water Trusts Act 1958 and the Dandenong Valley Authority Act 1963. (Note: Dandenong Valley Authority Act 1963 (No. 7060))
Victorian Economic Development Corporation (Amendment) Act 1981 (repealed)	No. 9687	5 January 1982
An Act to amend the Victorian Economic Development Corporation Act 1981 (Note: Victorian Economic Development Corporation Act 1981 (No. 9574)) and for other purposes. (Repealed by Victorian Economic Development Corporation (Amendment) Act 1982 (No. 9745))
Sale of Land (Deposits) Act 1981 (repealed)	No. 9688	5 January 1982
An Act to amend the Sale of Land Act 1962 (Note: Sale of Land Act 1962 (No. 6975)) to make provision with respect to the Payment of Estate Agents' Commission and for other purposes. (Repealed by Statute Law Revision Act 1995 (No. 11 of 1995))
Magistrates' Courts (Amendment) Act 1981 (repealed)	No. 9689	5 January 1982
An Act to amend the Magistrates' Courts Act 1971. (Note: Magistrates' Courts Act 1971 (No. 8184)) (Repealed by Statute Law Revision Act 1995 (No. 11 of 1995))
Bail (Amendment) Act 1981 (repealed)	No. 9690	5 January 1982
An Act to amend the Bail Act 1977. (Note: Bail Act 1977 (No. 9008)) (Repealed by Statute Law Revision Act 1995 (No. 11 of 1995))
Instruments (Enduring Powers of Attorney) Act 1981 (repealed)	No. 9691	5 January 1982
An Act to amend the Instruments Act 1958 (Note: Instruments Act 1958 (No. 6279)) to make provision with respect to Enduring Powers of Attorney and for other purposes. (Repealed by Statute Law Revision Act 1995 (No. 11 of 1995))
Penalties and Sentences (Amendment) Act 1981 (repealed)	No. 9692	5 January 1982
An Act to amend the Penalties and Sentences Act 1981. (Note: Penalties and Sentences Act 1981 (No. 9554)) (Repealed by Statute Law Revision Act 1995 (No. 11 of 1995))
Fisheries (Amendment) Act 1981 (repealed)	No. 9693	5 January 1982
An Act to amend the Fisheries Act 1968. (Note: Fisheries Act 1968 (No. 7780)) (Repealed by Statute Law Revision Act 1995 (No. 11 of 1995))
Wildlife (Protection of Whales) Act 1981 (repealed)	No. 9694	5 January 1982
An Act to amend the Wildlife Act 1975 (Note: Wildlife Act 1975 (No. 8699)) and Part VIII. of the Magistrates' Courts Act 1971 to make better Provision for the Protection of Whales. (Repealed by Statute Law Revision Act 1995 (No. 11 of 1995))
Constitution (Parliamentary Oaths) Act 1981	No. 9695	5 January 1982
An Act to amend the Constitution Act 1975 (Note: Constitution Act 1975 (No. 8750)) with respect to the Administration of Oaths by the Legislative Council the Legislative Assembly and Committees and Joint Committees thereof and for other purposes.
Small Claims Tribunals (Jurisdiction) Act 1981 (repealed)	No. 9696	5 January 1982
An Act to amend the Small Claims Tribunals Act 1973 (Note: Small Claims Tribunals Act 1973 (No. 8486)) with respect to the Jurisdiction of the Small Claims Tribunals and for other purposes. (Repealed by Statute Law Revision Act 1995 (No. 11 of 1995))
Legal Profession Practice (Amendment) Act 1981 (repealed)	No. 9697	5 January 1982
An Act to amend the Legal Profession Practice Act 1958 (Note: Legal Profession Practice Act 1958 (No. 6291)) and the Legal Aid Commission Act 1978 (Note: Legal Aid Commission Act 1978 (No. 9245)) and for other purposes. (Repealed by Statute Law Revision Act 1995 (No. 11 of 1995))
Companies (Administration) Act 1981	No. 9698	5 January 1982
An Act to establish the Corporate Affairs Commissioner as a body corporate, to establish the Companies Auditors and Liquidators Disciplinary Board, to amend the Companies Act 1961, (Note: Companies Act 1961 (No. 6839)) the Securities Industry Act 1975 (Note: Securities Industry Act 1975 (No. 8788)) and certain other Acts and for other purposes.
Companies (Consequential Amendments) Act 1981 (repealed)	No. 9699	5 January 1982
An Act to make amendments to certain Acts consequential upon the enactment of the Companies (Application of Laws) Act 1981, (Note: Companies (Application of Laws) Act 1981 (No. 9712)) to make certain other amendments to Acts and for other purposes. (Repealed by Statute Law Revision Act 1995 (No. 11 of 1995))
Melbourne and Metropolitan Board of Works (Yarra Development) Act 1981 (repealed)	No. 9700	5 January 1982
An Act to amend the Melbourne and Metropolitan Board of Works Act 1958 to provide for the Development of the Yarra River and the Maribyrnong River and for other purposes. (Repealed by Statute Law Revision Act 1995 (No. 11 of 1995))
Victorian Water and Sewerage Authorities Association Act 1981 (repealed)	No. 9701	5 January 1982
An Act to make Provision with respect to the Amalgamation of the Provincial Sewerage Authorities Association of Victoria and the Waterworks Trusts Association of Victoria. (Repealed by Water Act 1989 (No. 80 of 1989))
Fuel Prices Regulation Act 1981	No. 9702	5 January 1982
An Act with respect to the Regulation of Prices for certain Fuel and for other purposes.
Railways (Amendment) Act 1981 (repealed)	No. 9703	5 January 1982
An Act to amend the Railways Act 1958 (Note: Railways Act 1958 (No. 6355)) and for other purposes. (Repealed by Transport Act 1983 (No. 9921))
Petroleum Retail Selling Sites Act 1981	No. 9704	5 January 1982
An Act with respect to the Rights and Liabilities of Persons occupying Land for the purpose of selling Motor Fuel by Retail and for other purposes.
Land (Further Amendment) Act 1981 (repealed)	No. 9705	5 January 1982
An Act to further amend the Land Act 1958. (Note: Land Act 1958 (No. 6284)) (Repealed by Statute Law Revision Act 1995 (No. 11 of 1995))
Water and Sewerage Authorities (Interest Payments) Act 1981	No. 9706	5 January 1982
An Act to amend the Sewerage Districts Act 1958 and the Water Act 1958 with respect to the Payment of Interest.
Disposal of Dartmouth Township Act 1981 (repealed)	No. 9707	5 January 1982
An Act to amend Section 15 of the River Murray Waters Act 1915 (Note: River Murray Waters Act 1915 (6 Geo. V. No. 2596)) and Section 34 of the Water Act 1958. (Repealed by Statute Law Revision Act 1995 (No. 11 of 1995))
Wrongs (Defamation) Act 1981 (repealed)	No. 9708	5 January 1982
An Act to amend the Wrongs Act 1958 (Note: Wrongs Act 1958 (No. 6420)) in relation to the Reporting of certain Public Inquiries. (Repealed by Statute Law Revision Act 1995 (No. 11 of 1995))
Education (Councils) Act 1981 (repealed)	No. 9709	5 January 1982
An Act to amend section 29A of the Education Act 1958. (Note: Education Act 1958 (No. 6240)) (Repealed by Statute Law Revision Act 1995 (No. 11 of 1995))
Charities (Amendment) Act 1981 (repealed)	No. 9710	5 January 1982
An Act to amend the Charities Act 1978 (Note: Charities Act 1978 (No. 9227)) to enable Investigations of the Affairs of Charities to be carried out and for other purposes. (Repealed by Statute Law Revision Act 1995 (No. 11 of 1995))
Post-Secondary Education (Amendment) Act 1981 (repealed)	No. 9711	5 January 1982
An Act to amend the Post-Secondary Education Act 1978 (Note: Post-Secondary Education Act 1978 (No. 9145)) and the Melbourne University Act 1958, (Note: University Act 1958 (No. 6405)) and for other purposes. (Repealed by Statute Law Revision (Repeals) Act 1999 (No. 3 of 1999))
Companies (Application of Laws) Act 1981	No. 9712	5 January 1982
An Act to make Provision for the Formation of Companies in Victoria, the Regulation of Companies formed in Victoria, the Registration in Victoria of certain other Bodies and certain other Matters, and for other purposes.
Associations Incorporation Act 1981 (repealed)	No. 9713	5 January 1982
An Act to make provision for the Incorporation of certain Associations, for the Regulation of certain Affairs of Incorporated Associations, to amend the Evidence Act 1958 (Note: Evidence Act 1958 (No. 6246)) and for other purposes. (Repealed by Associations Incorporation Reform Act 2012 (No. 20 of 2012))
Education Service Act 1981 or the Teaching Service Act 1981	No. 9714	5 January 1982
An Act to establish the Education Service, to repeal the Teaching Service Act 1958 (Note: Teaching Service Act 1958 (No. 6391)) and for other purposes.
Lotteries Gaming and Betting (Amendment) Act 1981 (repealed)	No. 9715	5 January 1982
An Act to amend the Lotteries Gaming and Betting Act 1966 (Note: Lotteries Gaming and Betting Act 1966 (No. 7429)) and for other purposes. (Repealed by Statute Law Revision Act 1995 (No. 11 of 1995))
Film Victoria Act 1981	No. 9716	5 January 1982
An Act to establish a Body Corporate by the Name of Film Victoria, to abolish the Victorian Film Corporation, to repeal the Victorian Film Corporation Act 1976 (Note: Victorian Film Corporation Act 1976 (No. 8864)) and certain other Enactments and for other purposes.
Industrial Safety, Health and Welfare Act 1981	No. 9717	5 January 1982
An Act to provide for the Safety, Health and Welfare of Persons employed or engaged in Industry, for the Safety of Persons affected by Industry, to repeal certain provisions of the Labour and Industry Act 1958 (Note: Labour and Industry Act 1958 (No. 6283)) and for other purposes.
Co-operation Act 1981 (repealed)	No. 8718	12 January 1982
An Act to re-enact with Amendments the Law relating to the Formation, Registration and Management of Co-operative Societies and Purposes connected therewith. (Repealed by Co-operatives Act 1996 (No. 84 of 1996))
Drugs, Poisons and Controlled Substances Act 1981	No. 9719	12 January 1982
An Act to re-enact with Amendments the Law relating to Drugs, Poisons and Controlled Substances, to amend the Health Act 1958 (Note: Health Act 1958 (No. 6270)) and the Crimes Act 1958 (Note: Crimes Act 1958 (No. 6231)) and for other purposes.
Building Control Act 1981	No. 9720	12 January 1982
An Act to consolidate and amend and make further Provision for the Law relating to Building, to provide for the better Regulation of Building, to establish a Division of Building Control, a Building Control Technical Advisory Council, a Building Control Accreditation Authority, a Plumbers Gasfitters and Drainers Registration Board, a Building Qualifications Board and Building Referees Boards, to amend the Health Act 1958, the Housing Act 1958, (Note: Housing Act 1958 (No. 6275)) the Labour and Industry Act 1958, the Local Government Act 1958 and other Acts and for other purposes.
Constitution Act 1981 (repealed)	No. 9721	19 January 1982 (Note: This act was reserved for approval by Her Majesty, as required by section 1 of the Australian States Constitution Act 1907 (7 Edw. 7. c. 7 (Imp)).)
An Act to amend the Constitution Act 1975 with respect to Pensions payable in respect of former Governors of the State and the exercise of Ministerial powers. (Repealed by Statute Law Revision Act 1995 (No. 11 of 1995))
Historic Shipwrecks Act 1981	No. 9722	10 March 1982
An Act to make Provision for the Protection of Certain Shipwrecks and Relics of Historic Significance.
Commercial Bank of Australia Limited (Merger) Act 1982	No. 9723	1 June 1982
An Act to provide for the transfer to Bank of New South Wales of the undertaking of The Commercial Bank of Australia Limited and for the transfer to Bank of New South Wales Savings Bank Limited of the undertaking of The Commercial Savings Bank of Australia Limited and for other purposes.
Commercial Banking Company of Sydney Limited (Merger) Act 1982	No. 9724	1 June 1982
An Act to supplement The Commercial Banking Company of Sydney Limited (Merger) Act 1982 (Note: Commercial Banking Company of Sydney Limited (Merger) Act 1982 (No. 32 (NSW))) of the State of New South Wales which provides for the transfer to The National Bank of Australasia Limited of the undertaking of The Commercial Banking Company of Sydney Limited and for the transfer to The National Bank Savings Bank Limited of the undertaking of C.B.C. Savings Bank Limited and for other purposes.
Stamps (Matrimonial Settlements) Act 1982	No. 9725	22 June 1982
An Act to provide Exemptions from Stamp Duty in relation to certain Dealings with Property and for that purpose to amend the Stamps Act 1958 (Note: Stamps Act 1958 (No. 6375)) and for other purposes.
Stamps (First Purchases of Land) Act 1982	No. 9726	22 June 1982
An Act to provide Exemptions from Stamp Duty in relation to certain Purchases of Land and for that purpose to amend the Stamps Act 1958 and for other purposes.
Metropolitan Fire Brigades (Amendment) Act 1982	No. 9727	22 June 1982
An Act to amend the Metropolitan Fire Brigades Act 1958 (Note: Metropolitan Fire Brigades Act 1958 (No. 6315)) to increase the bank overdraft limit of the Metropolitan Fire Brigades Board and for other purposes.
Howard Florey Institute of Experimental Physiology and Medicine Act 1982 (repealed)	No. 9728	22 June 1982
An Act to make further provision with respect to the powers of the Howard Florey Institute of Experimental Physiology and Medicine, to amend the Howard Florey Institute of Experimental Physiology and Medicine Act 1971 (Note: Howard Florey Institute of Experimental Physiology and Medicine Act 1971 (No. 8108)) and for other purposes. (Repealed by Statute Law Revision Act 1995 (No. 11 of 1995))
Building Societies (Control) Act 1982	No. 9729	22 June 9182
An Act to make further provision with respect to the Operation of Building Societies, to amend the Building Societies Act 1976, (Note: Building Societies Act 1976 (No. 8966)) and for other purposes.
Constitution (Executive Council Expenses) Act 1982 (repealed)	No. 9730	29 June 1982
An Act to amend the Constitution Act 1975 to increase the amount payable for the Clerk and the expenses of the Executive Council. (Repealed by Statute Law Revision Act 1995 (No. 11 of 1995))
Appeal Costs Fund (Amendment) Act 1982	No. 9731	29 June 1982
An Act to amend the Appeal Costs Fund Act 1964 (Note: Appeal Costs Fund Act 1964 (No. 7117)) and for other purposes.
Supply (1982-83, No. 1) Act 1982 (repealed)	No. 9732	29 June 1982
An Act to make Interim Provision for the Appropriation of Moneys out of the Consolidated Fund for the Service of the Financial Year 1982-83. (Repealed by Statute Law Revision (Repeals) Act 1999 (No. 3 of 1999))
Pay-roll Tax (Amendment) Act 1982	No. 9733	29 June 1982
An Act to amend the Pay-roll Tax Act 1971 (Note: Pay-roll Tax Act 1971 (No. 8154)) and the Land Tax Act 1958, (Note: Land Tax Act 1958 (No. 6289)) and for other purposes.
West Gate Bridge Authority (Transfer of Functions) Act 1982 (repealed)	No. 9734	29 June 1982
An Act to confer certain powers on the Country Roads Board, to amend the Country Roads Act 1958, (Note: Country Roads Act 1958 (No. 6229)) to repeal the West Gate Bridge Authority Act 1980 (Note: West Gate Bridge Authority Act 1980 (No. 9513)) and for other purposes. (Repealed by Transport Act 1983 (No. 9921))
Melbourne and Metropolitan Board of Works (Differential Rating) Act 1982 (repealed)	No. 9735	29 June 1982
An Act to empower the differential rating of Land by the Melbourne and Metropolitan Board of Works, to amend the Melbourne and Metropolitan Board of Works Act 1958, and for other purposes. (Repealed by Statute Law Revision Act 1995 (No. 11 of 1995))
Psychological Practices (Scientology) Act 1982 (repealed)	No. 9736	29 June 1982
An Act to repeal certain provisions of the Psychological Practices Act 1965 (Note: Psychological Practices Act 1965 (No. 7355)) relating to the practice of Scientology and for other purposes. (Repealed by Statute Law Revision Act 1995 (No. 11 of 1995))
Health (Private Hospitals) Act 1982	No. 9737	29 June 1982
An Act to amend Part X. of the Health Act 1958.
Racing (Payment of Dividends) Act 1982	No. 9738	29 June 1982
An Act to repeal the Provisions of the Racing Act 1958 (Note: Racing Act 1958 (No. 6353)) requiring the Payment of certain Dividends by the Totalizator Agency Board to be withheld until the Holding of the last Event at a meeting.
Optometrists Registration (Amendment) Act 1982	No. 9739	6 July 1982
An Act to amend the Optometrists Registration Act 1958. (Note: Optometrists Registration Act 1958 (No. 6329))
Motor Car (Breath Analysing Instruments) Act 1982 (repealed)	No. 9740	6 July 1982
An Act to amend Section 80F of and Schedule Seven to the Motor Car Act 1958 (Note: Motor Car Act 1958 (No. 6325)) with respect to Breath Analysing Instruments and for Purposes connected therewith. (Repealed by Statute Law Revision Act 1995 (No. 11 of 1995))
Victorian Arts Centre (Guarantees) Act 1982	No. 9741	6 July 1982
An Act to amend Section 7 of the Victorian Arts Centre Act 1979. (Note: Victorian Arts Centre Act 1979 (No. 9354))
Transport Regulation (Tow Trucks) Act 1982 (repealed)	No. 9742	6 July 1982
An Act to amend the Transport Regulation Act 1958 (Note: Transport Regulation Act 1958 (No. 6400)) with respect to the Operation of Tow Trucks in certain Areas and for other purposes. (Repealed by Transport Act 1983 (No. 9921))
Superannuation (Amendment) Act 1982	No. 9743	6 July 1982
An Act to amend the Superannuation Act 1958. (Note: Superannuation Act 1958 (No. 6386))
Local Government (City of Richmond) Act 1982	No. 9744	6 July 1982
An Act to authorize the Establishment of a Commission to administer the City of Richmond, to dismiss the Council of the City of Richmond from Office, to provide for the restoration of an Elected Council and for other purposes.
Victorian Economic Development Corporation (Amendment) Act 1982	No. 9745	6 July 1982
An Act to amend the Victorian Economic Development Corporation Act 1981, to repeal the Victorian Economic Development Corporation (Amendment) Act 1981 (Note: Victorian Economic Development Corporation (Amendment) Act 1981 (No. 9687)) and for other purposes.
Public Authorities (Sinking Funds) Act 1982 (repealed)	No. 9746	6 July 1982
An Act to make provision with respect to Sinking Funds of certain Public Authorities, to amend the Grain Elevators Act 1958, (Note: Grain Elevators Act 1958 (No. 6266)) the Melbourne and Metropolitan Board of Works Act 1958, the Port of Geelong Authority Act 1958, (Note: Geelong Harbor Trust Act 1958 (No. 6262)) the Port of Melbourne Authority Act 1958, (Note: Melbourne Harbor Trust Act 1958 (No. 6312)) the State Electricity Commission Act 1958 (Note: State Electricity Commission Act 1958 (No. 6377)) and for other purposes. (Repealed by Treasury Legislation (Repeal) Act 2005 (No. 73 of 2005))
Workers Compensation (Benefit Rates) Act 1982	No. 9747	6 July 1982
An Act to amend Section 9 of the Workers Compensation Act 1958.
Transport Regulation (Vehicles) Act 1982 (repealed)	No. 9748	6 July 1982
An Act to amend the Transport Regulation Act 1958 with respect to the Carriage of Goods and Passengers for certain purposes. (Repealed by Transport Act 1983 (No. 9921))
Weights and Measures (Time for Verification) Act 1982	No. 9749	6 July 1982
An Act to amend the Weights and Measures Act 1958 (Note: Weights and Measures Act 1958 (No. 6414)) with respect to the Time for Verification of certain Weights Measures Weighing Instruments and Measuring Instruments.
Bourke Street Mall Act 1982	No. 9750	13 July 1982
An Act to provide for the Development of the Bourke Street Mall and for other purposes.
Local Authorities Superannuation (Amendment) Act 1982	No. 9751	13 July 1982
An Act to amend the Local Authorities Superannuation Act 1958 (Note: Local Authorities Superannuation Act 1958 (No. 6298)) and for other purposes.
State Employees Retirement Benefits (School Council Employees) Act 1982	No. 9752	13 July 1982
An Act to amend the State Employees Retirement Benefits Act 1979 (Note: State Employees Retirement Benefits Act 1979 (No. 9363)) with respect to past Service of Employees of School Councils and other matters.
Parliamentary Superannuation Act 1982	No. 9753	13 July 1982
An Act to amend The Constitution Act Amendment Act 1958, (Note: Constitution Act Amendment Act 1958 (No. 6224)) the Parliamentary Contributory Superannuation Act 1962 (Note: Parliamentary Contributory Superannuation Act 1962 (No. 6968)) and the Parliamentary Salaries and Superannuation Act 1968 (Note: Parliamentary Salaries and Superannuation Act 1968 (No. 7723)) to make Provision with respect to the Superannuation Entitlements of Members of Parliament, former Members, their Widows and Dependants and for other purposes.
Melbourne and Metropolitan Board of Works (Offices) Act 1982 (repealed)	No. 9754	13 July 1982
An Act to amend the Melbourne and Metropolitan Board of Works Act 1958 with respect to Offices, and for other purposes. (Repealed by Statute Law Revision Act 1995 (No. 11 of 1995))
Water and Sewerage Districts (Amendment) Act 1982	No. 9755	13 July 1982
An Act to amend Section 65c of the Water Act 1958 and to amend Section 81 of the Sewerage Districts Act 1958 and for other purposes.
Hospitals Superannuation (Amendment) Act 1982	No. 9756	13 July 1982
An Act to facilitate the Transfer of the Hospitals Superannuation Act 1965 (Note: Hospitals Superannuation Act 1965 (No. 7354)) from the administration of the Minister of Health.
Abattoir and Meat Inspection (Amendment) Act 1982	No. 9757	13 July 1982
An Act to amend the Abattoir and Meat Inspection Act 1973. (Note: Abattoir and Meat Inspection Act 1973 (No. 8404))
Environment Protection (Penalties) Act 1982	No. 9758	13 July 1982
An Act to amend the Environment Protection Act 1970 (Note: Environment Protection Act 1970 (No. 8056)) to increase penalties.
Baxter Technical School Land Act 1982	No. 9759	13 July 1982
An Act to authorize the Minister of Education of the State of Victoria to enter into a Lease and Licence with the Commonwealth of Australia with respect to the use for Defence and other purposes of certain Lands in the City of Frankston, to expend moneys on the construction of Buildings and the provision of facilities in connexion with the Lease and Licence, and for other purposes.
Environment Protection (Lead in Petrol) Act 1982	No. 9760	13 July 1982
An Act to make further provision for reducing Pollution of the Air from Motor Vehicles, to amend the Environment Protection Act 1970 and for other purposes.
Companies (Consequential Amendments) Act 1982	No. 9761	13 July 1982
An Act to make amendments to certain Acts consequential on the enactment of the Companies (Application of Laws) Act 1981 and for other purposes.
Pipelines (Amendment) Act 1982	No. 9762	13 July 1982
An Act to amend the Pipelines Act 1967 (Note: Pipelines Act 1967 (No. 7541)) and for other purposes.
Melbourne Corporation (Election of Council) Act 1982	No. 9763	13 July 1982
An Act to amend the Law relating to the city of Melbourne, to amend the Melbourne and Geelong Corporations Act 1938, (Note: Melbourne and Geelong Corporations Act 1938 (No. 4574)) the Local Government Act 1958, to repeal the Local Government (City of Melbourne) Act 1981 (Note: Local Government (City of Melbourne) Act 1981 (No. 9525)) and for other purposes.
Hospital Benefits (Levy) Act 1982 (repealed)	No. 9764	13 July 1982
An Act to impose a Levy on Organizations carrying on Hospital Benefits Business in Victoria, to make Provision to Free from Payment of Out-Patient Fees Contributors to Hospital Benefit Funds in Victoria and for other purposes. (Repealed by Treasury Legislation (Repeal) Act 2005 (No. 73 of 2005))
Parliamentary Committees (Joint Investigatory Committees) Act 1982 (repealed)	No. 9765	13 July 1982
An Act to make Provision with respect to the Establishment, Powers and Functions of certain Joint Investigatory Committees of the Legislative Council and the Legislative Assembly, to repeal the Public Works Committee Act 1958, (Note: Public Works Committee Act 1958 (No. 6352)) the State Development Committee Act 1958, (Note: State Development Act 1958 (No. 6376)) the Joint Select Committee (Conservation of Energy Resources) Act 1976 (Note: Joint Select Committee (Conservation of Energy Resources) Act 1976 (No. 8851)) and certain other Acts, to amend the Melbourne and Metropolitan Tramways Act 1958, (Note: Melbourne and Metropolitan Tramways Act 1958 (No. 6311)) the Subordinate Legislation Act 1962, (Note: Subordinate Legislation Act 1962 (No. 6886)) the Parliamentary Committees Act 1968, (Note: Parliamentary Committees Act 1968 (No. 7727)) the Constitution Act 1975 and certain other Acts and for other purposes. (Repealed by Statute Law Revision Act 1995 (No. 11 of 1995))
Evidence (Commissions) Act 1982	No. 9766	13 July 1982
An Act to make provision with respect to the giving of information to Commissions, to amend the Land Tax Act 1958, the Stamps Act 1958, the Pay-roll Tax Act 1971 and the Business Franchise (Tobacco) Act 1974 (Note: Business Franchise (Tobacco) Act 1974 (No. 8597)) and for other purposes.
Town and Country Planning (Amendment) Act 1982	No. 9767	13 July 1982
An Act to amend the Town and Country Planning Act 1961 (Note: Town and Country Planning Act 1961 (No. 6849)) and for other purposes.
Lotteries Gaming and Betting (Advertisements) Act 1982	No. 9768	13 July 1982
An Act to amend section 40 of the Lotteries Gaming and Betting Act 1966 to further restrict the publication of information concerning betting odds.
Local Government (Board of Review) Act 1982	No. 9769	13 July 1982
An Act to amend the Local Government Act 1958 and for other purposes.
Public Account (Cash Management Account) Act 1982	No. 9770	13 July 1982
An Act to amend the Public Account Act 1958 (Note: Public Account Act 1958 (No. 6345)) and for other purposes.
Local Government (General Amendment) Act 1982	No. 9771	13 July 1982
An Act to amend the Local Government Act 1958, the Town and Country Planning Act 1961, the Local Government (Further Amendment) Act 1981, (Note: Local Government (Further Amendment) Act 1981 (No. 9575)) the Building Control Act 1981 (Note: Building Control Act 1981 (No. 9720)) and for other purposes.
Petroleum (Submerged Lands) Act 1982	No. 9772	20 July 1982
An Act to make provision with respect to the Exploration for and the Exploitation of the Petroleum Resources, and certain other Resources, of certain Submerged Lands adjacent to the Coasts of Victoria, to amend the Petroleum Act 1958 (Note: Petroleum Act 1958 (No. 6334)) and the Acts Interpretation Act 1958 (Note: Acts Interpretation Act 1958 (No. 6189)) and for other purposes.
Constitution (Governor's Salary) Act 1982 (repealed)	No. 9773	1 September 1982
An Act to amend the Constitution Act 1975 to increase the Governor's Salary. (Repealed by Statute Law Revision Act 1995 (No. 11 of 1995))
Burrumbeet (Russell Reserve) Land Act 1982	No. 9774	14 September 1982
An Act to authorize the Granting of Leases of certain Crown Land in the Parish of Haddon permanently reserved as a Site for Public Purposes and for other purposes.
Seeds Act 1982 (repealed)	No. 9775	14 September 1982
An Act to consolidate and amend the Law relating to Seeds, and for other purposes. (Repealed by Plant Health and Plant Products Act 1995 (No. 51 of 1995))
Co-operative Housing Societies and Co-operation (Amendment) Act 1982	No. 9776	21 September 1982
An Act to amend the Co-operative Housing Societies Act 1958 (Note: Co-operative Housing Societies Act 1958 (No. 6226)) and the Co-operation Act 1981 (Note: Co-operation Act 1981 (No. 8718)) with respect to the Execution of Guarantees and the Entering into of Agreements by the Treasurer of Victoria and for other purposes.
Industrial and Provident Societies (Amendment) Act 1982	No. 9777	21 September 1982
An Act to amend the Industrial and Provident Societies Act 1958. (Note: Industrial and Provident Societies Act 1958 (No. 6277))
Council of Law Reporting in Victoria Act 1982 (repealed)	No. 9778	21 September 1982
An Act to amend the Council of Law Reporting in Victoria Act 1967 (Note: Council of Law Reporting in Victoria Act 1967 (No. 7569)) and for other purposes. (Repealed by Statute Law Revision Act 1995 (No. 11 of 1995))
Dentists (Fees) Act 1982	No. 9779	28 September 1982
An Act to amend the Dentists Act 1972 (Note: Dentists Act 1972 (No. 8287)) with respect to Fees and for other purposes.
Domicile (Amendment) Act 1982	No. 9780	28 September 1982
An Act to amend the Domicile Act 1978 (Note: Domicile Act 1978 (No. 9231)) in relation to the Domicile of certain Children and for other purposes.
Local Government Department (Director-General for Local Government) Act 1982	No. 9781	6 October 1982
An Act to change the title of the Secretary for Local Government and for that purpose to amend the Local Government Department Act 1958, (Note: Local Government Department Act 1958 (No. 6479)) the Local Government Act 1958, the Public Service Act 1974, (Note: Public Service Act 1974 (No. 8658)) the State Co-ordination Council Act 1975 (Note: State Co-ordination Council Act 1975 (No. 8793)) and the Building Control Act 1981.
Health (Amendment) Act 1982	No. 9782	12 October 1982
An Act to amend the Health Act 1958.
Road Traffic (Amendment) Act 1982 (repealed)	No. 9783	12 October 1982
An Act to amend the Road Traffic Act 1958 (Note: Road Traffic Act 1958 (No. 6359)) to increase certain penalties and for other purposes. (Repealed by Transport Act 1983 (No. 9921))
Health (Privileges) Act 1982	No. 9784	19 October 1982
An Act to clarify and extend privileges and immunities in relation to proceeding before Disciplinary Tribunals under Acts administered by the Minister of Health by amending those Acts, and for other purposes.
Public Lands and Works (Public Projects) Act 1982	No. 9785	19 October 1982
An Act to authorize the Minister of Public Works to assist in the implementation of Public Projects to amend the Public Lands and Works Act 1964 (Note: Public Lands and Works Act 1964 (No. 7228)) and for other purposes.
Residential Tenancies (Amendment) Act 1982	No. 9786	26 October 1982
An Act to amend the Residential Tenancies Act 1980 (Note: Residential Tenancies Act 1980 (No. 9514)) and the Landlord and Tenant Act 1958 (Note: Landlord and Tenant Act 1958 (No. 6285)) and for other purposes.
Local Government (Pecuniary Interests of Councillors) Act 1982	No. 9787	26 October 1982
An Act to amend the Provisions of the Local Government Act 1958 with respect to the Pecuniary Interests of Councillors, and for other purposes.
Education Service (Amendment) Act 1982	No. 9788	9 November 1982
An Act to amend the Education Service Act 1981, (Note: Education Service Act 1981 (No. 9714)) the Constitution Act 1975, The Constitution Act Amendment Act 1958 and the Teaching Service Act 1958 and for other purposes.
Ethnic Affairs Commission Act 1982 (repealed)	No. 9789	9 November 1982
An Act to establish an Ethnic Affairs Commission, to repeal the Ministry of Immigration and Ethnic Affairs Act 1976 (Note: Ministry of Immigration and Ethnic Affairs Act 1976 (No. 8963)) and for other purposes. (Repealed by Ethnic Affairs Commission Act 1993 (No. 26 of 1993))
Public Account (Amendment) Act 1982	No. 9790	16 November 1982
An Act to amend Section 16 of the Public Account Act 1958, and for other purposes.
Pounds (Amendment) Act 1982	No. 9791	16 November 1982
An Act to amend the Pounds Act 1958 (Note: Pounds Act 1958 (No. 6341)) and for other purposes.
Victorian Tobacco Growers (Disposal of Assets) Act 1982	No. 9792	16 November 1982
An Act to make Provision with respect to the Disposal of Assets acquired by the Victorian Tobacco Growers Association and for other purposes.
Sewerage Districts (Sewerage Schemes) Act 1982	No. 9793	16 November 1982
An Act to amend the Sewerage Districts Act 1958 with respect to Schemes for the Construction of Sewers pursuant to section 120A of that Act and for other purposes.
Appropriation (1982-83, No. 1) Act 1982 (repealed)	No. 9794	16 November 1982
An Act to appropriate certain Sums out of the Consolidated Fund for the Service of the Financial Year 1982-83 and to appropriate the Supplies granted in this Session of Parliament and for other purposes. (Repealed by Statute Law Revision Act 1995 (No. 11 of 1995))
Geelong Performing Arts Centre Trust (Amendment) Act 1982	No. 9795	23 November 1982
An Act with respect to the functions of the Geelong Performing Arts Centre Trust to amend the Geelong Performing Arts Centre Trust Act 1980 (Note: Geelong Performing Arts Centre Trust Act 1980 (No. 9406)) and for other purposes.
Aboriginal Lands (Aborigines' Advancement League) (Watt Street, Northcote) Act 1982	No. 9796	23 November 1982
An Act to make provision with respect to a Crown Grant of land at Watt Street, Northcote in the Parish of Jika Jika.
Pipelines (Fees) Act 1982	No. 9797	23 November 1982
An Act to amend the Pipelines Act 1967 with respect to Pipeline Operation Fees and for other purposes.
Closer Settlement (Winding-Up) Act 1982	No. 9798	23 November 1982
An Act to repeal the Closer Settlement Act 1938, (Note: Closer Settlement Act 1938 (No. 4597)) to make certain consequential Repeals and Amendments and for Purposes connected therewith.
Ministry of Transport (Amendment) Act 1982 (repealed)	No. 9799	23 November 1982
An Act to abolish certain offices in the Ministry of Transport, to create certain other offices, to amend the Ministry of Transport Act 1958 (Note: Ministry of Transport Act 1958 (No. 6322)) and for other purposes. (Repealed by Transport Act 1983 (No. 9921))
Works and Services Appropriation Act 1982 (repealed)	No. 9800	23 November 1982
An Act with respect to the Appropriation of Moneys out of the Works and Services Account for certain Works and Purposes. (Repealed by Statute Law Revision Act 1995 (No. 11 of 1995))
Electoral Commission Act 1982	No. 9801	23 November 1982
An Act to establish an Electoral Commission for dividing the State of Victoria from time to time into Electoral Provinces for the Legislative Council and Electoral Districts for the Legislative Assembly.
Motor Car (Penalties) Act 1982 (repealed)	No. 9802	23 November 1982
An Act to amend the Penalties fixed under the Motor Car Act 1958 for Offences against that Act and Regulations made under that Act. (Repealed by Statute Law Revision Act 1995 (No. 11 of 1995))
Environment Protection (Air Pollution Control) Act 1982	No. 9803	23 November 1982
An Act to amend the Environment Protection Act 1970 and for other purposes.
Liquor Control (Booth Licences) (Amendment) Act 1982	No. 9804	1 December 1982
An Act to amend the Liquor Control Act 1968 (Note: Liquor Control Act 1968 (No. 7695)) with respect to Booth Licences and for other purposes.
Land (Amendment) Act 1982	No. 9805	7 December 1982
An Act to amend the Land Act 1958.
Werribee South Water Supply (Validation) Act 1982	No. 9806	7 December 1982
An Act relating to the Werribee South Water Supply Scheme and for other purposes.
Superannuation (Railway Service Employés) Act 1982 or the Superannuation (Railway Service Employees) Act 1982	No. 9807	7 December 1982
An Act to amend the Superannuation Act 1975 (Note: Superannuation Act 1975 (No. 8717)) with respect to certain Railway Service Employés.
Film Victoria (Reconstitution) Act 1982	No. 9808	7 December 1982
An Act to amend the Film Victoria Act 1981 (Note: Film Victoria Act 1981 (No. 9716)) with respect to the Constitution, Functions and Powers of Film Victoria, to amend the Ministry for the Arts Act 1972 (Note: Ministry for the Arts Act 1972 (No. 8357)) and the Public Service Act 1974 and for other purpose.
State Electricity Commission (Financial Arrangements) Act 1982	No. 9809	7 December 1982
An Act to amend the State Electricity Commission Act 1958 and for other Purposes.
Motor Car (Registration and Drivers' Licences) Act 1982 (repealed)	No. 9810	14 December 1982
An Act to amend the Motor Car Act 1958 with respect to Registration and Drivers' Licences, to amend the Motor Car (Drivers' Licences) Act 1981 (Note: Motor Car (Drivers' Licences) Act 1981 (No. 9680)) and for other purposes. (Repealed by Statute Law Revision (Repeals) Act 1999 (No. 3 of 1999))
Local Government (House Builders' Liability) (Amendment) Act 1982	No. 9811	14 December 1982
An Act to amend Division 1A of Part XLIX. of the Local Government Act 1958, to amend the Building Control Act 1981 and for other purposes.
Victorian College of Agriculture and Horticulture Act 1982	No. 9812	14 December 1982
An Act to provide for the establishment of a post-secondary education institution to be known as the Victorian College of Agriculture and Horticulture and for the transfer to the College of the control and administration of the Agricultural Colleges carried on as State Agricultural Colleges pursuant to the Agricultural Colleges Act 1958, (Note: Agricultural Colleges Act 1958 (No. 6194)) to repeal the Agricultural Colleges Act 1958, to amend the Land Act 1958 and the Post-Secondary Education Remuneration Tribunal Act 1980, (Note: Post-Secondary Education Remuneration Tribunal Act 1980 (No. 9485)) and for other purposes.
Judges Salaries Act 1982	No. 9813	14 December 1982
An Act to amend the Constitution Act 1975 and the County Court Act 1958 (Note: County Court Act 1958 (No. 6230)) with respect to the Salaries of Judges of the Supreme Court and the County Court.
Lotteries Gaming and Betting (Amendment) Act 1982	No. 9814	14 December 1982
An Act to amend the Lotteries Gaming and Betting Act 1966 with respect to pre-race Betting on the Stawell Easter Gift (Note: Stawell Gift.) and for other purposes.
Public Account (State Development Account) Act 1982	No. 9815	14 December 1982
An Act to amend the Public Account Act 1958 and the Audit Act 1958 (Note: Audit Act 1958 (No. 6203)) and for other purposes.
Trustee (Authorized Investments) Act 1982	No. 9816	14 December 1982
An Act to make further provisions with respect to Authorized Trustee Investments and housing loans by trustees and building societies and to amend the Building Societies Act 1976, the Public Account Act 1958 and the Trustee Act 1958. (Note: Trustee Act 1958 (No. 6401))
Abattoir and Meat Inspection (Further Amendment) Act 1982	No. 9817	14 December 1982
An Act to amend the Abattoir and Meat Inspection Act 1973, to provide for an Additional Member to be appointed to the Victorian Abattoir and Meat Inspection Authority, to make further provision for recovery of Fees for Inspection Services, and for other purposes.
Labour and Industry (Shops) Act 1982	No. 9818	21 December 1982
An Act to amend the Labour and Industry Act 1958 with respect to Shops and for other purposes.
Wheat Marketing (Amendment) Act 1982	No. 9819	21 December 1982
An Act to amend the (Note: Wheat Marketing Act 1979 (No. 9362)) and for other purposes.
Water (Penalties and Borrowing Powers) Act 1982	No. 9820	21 December 1982
An Act to amend the Water Act 1958 with respect to the borrowing powers of the State Rivers and Water Supply Commission and with respect to penalties and to amend certain other Enactments with respect to penalties and for other purposes.
Cemeteries (Amendment) (Commencement) Act 1982	No. 9821	21 December 1982
An Act to amend the Cemeteries (Amendment) Act 1980 (Note: Cemeteries (Amendment) Act 1980 (No. 9431)) with respect to the Commencement of that Act and for other purposes.
Eastern Railway Construction (Repeal) Act 1982 (repealed)	No. 9822	21 December 1982
An Act to repeal the Eastern Railway Construction Act 1971 (Note: Eastern Railway Construction Act 1971 (No. 8235)) and to facilitate the disposal of land acquired for the purposes thereof. (Repealed by Transport Act 1983 (No. 9921))
Farm Produce Merchants and Commission Agents (Amendment) Act 1982	No. 9823	21 December 1982
An Act to amend the Farm Produce Merchants and Commission Agents Act 1965. (Note: Farm Produce Merchants and Commission Agents Act 1965 (No. 7274))
Melbourne and Metropolitan Board of Works (Administration) Act 1982 (repealed)	No. 9824	21 December 1982
An Act to amend the Melbourne and Metropolitan Board of Works Act 1958 the Town and Country Planning Act 1961 and the Water Resources Act 1975 (Note: Water Resources Act 1975 (No. 8729)) with respect to the Administration of the Board, the Penalties payable for Offences against the said Act and for other purposes. (Repealed by Legislation Reform (Repeals No. 2) Act 2008 (No. 16 of 2008))
Construction Industry (Electrical and Metal Trades) Long Service Leave Act 1982 (repealed)	No. 9825	21 December 1982
An Act to empower the Building Industry Long Service Leave Board to do all acts and things necessary in contemplation of the extension of the operation of the Building Industry Long Service Leave Act 1975 (Note: Building Industry Long Service Leave Act 1975 (No. 8693)) to and in relation to the provision of long service leave for Persons employed in Electrical and Metal Trades Work in the Construction Industry and to empower the payment of moneys out of the Building Industry Long Service Leave Fund for that purpose, and for other purposes. (Repealed by Construction Industry Long Service Leave Act 1983 (No. 9935))
Constitution (Qualification of Electors) Act 1982 (repealed)	No. 9826	21 December 1982
An Act to amend section 48 of the Constitution Act 1975, sections 181, 183 and 187 of The Constitution Act Amendment Act 1958 and for other purposes. (Repealed by Statute Law Revision Act 1995 (No. 11 of 1995))
Railways (Amendment) Act 1982 (repealed)	No. 9827	21 December 1982
An Act to amend the Railways Act 1958 and for other purposes. (Repealed by Transport Act 1983 (No. 9921))
Hospitals and Charities (Amendment) Act 1982	No. 9828	21 December 1982
An Act to amend the Hospitals and Charities Act 1958 (Note: Hospitals and Charities Act 1958 (No. 6274)) with respect to the Payments to be made by or in respect of Patients in Public Hospitals, to make Fresh Provision with respect to the Allocation of Beds in Public Hospitals, to amend the Cancer Act 1958 (Note: Cancer Act 1958 (No. 6213)) and for other purposes.
Veterinary Surgeons (Amendment) Act 1982	No. 9829	21 December 1982
An Act to amend the Veterinary Surgeons Act 1958 (Note: Veterinary Surgeons Act 1958 (No. 6410)) and for other purposes.
Educational Grants (Continuation) Act 1982	No. 9830	21 December 1982
An Act to amend the Educational Grants Act 1973. (Note: Educational Grants Act 1973 (No. 8495))
Local Government Acts (Miscellaneous Amendments) Act 1982	No. 9831	21 December 1982
An Act to make miscellaneous amendments to certain Acts administered by the Minister for Local Government and for that purpose to amend the Local Government Act 1958, the Local Authorities Superannuation Act 1958, the Valuation of Land Act 1960 (Note: Valuation of Land Act 1960 (No. 6653)) and the Building Control Act 1981 and for other purposes.
River Entrance Docks Railway Construction (Amendment) Act 1982 (repealed)	No. 9832	21 December 1982
An Act to amend the River Entrance Docks Railway Construction Act 1970 (Note: River Entrance Docks Railway Construction Act 1970 (No. 8009)) to vary the Route of the Line of Railway to be constructed to connect Melbourne with the Docks at the Mouth of the Yarra River, and for other purposes. (Repealed by Transport Act 1983 (No. 9921))
Groundwater (Amendment) Act 1982	No. 9833	21 December 1982
An Act to amend the Groundwater Act 1969 (Note: Groundwater Act 1969 (No. 7849)) with respect to Mineral Water.
Victorian Tourism Commission Act 1982	No. 9834	21 December 1982
An Act to establish a Victorian Tourism Commission, to repeal the Victorian Government Travel Authority Act 1977, (Note: Victorian Government Travel Authority Act 1977 (No. 9083)) to amend the Economic Development Act 1981, (Note: Economic Development Act 1981 (No. 9567)) the Motor Boating Act 1961, (Note: Motor Boating Act 1961 (No. 6832)) and for other purposes.
Country Roads (Lands) Act 1982 (repealed)	No. 9835	21 December 1982
An Act to amend the Country Roads Act 1958 with respect to Lands, and to authorize the Country Roads Board to take and use Certain Lands being Recreational Lands under the Cultural and Recreational Lands Act 1963, (Note: Cultural and Recreational Lands Act 1963 (No. 7101)) and for other purposes. (Repealed by Transport Act 1983 (No. 9921))
Queen Victoria Medical Centre (Guarantees) Act 1982	No. 9836	21 December 1982
An Act to authorize the Treasurer of Victoria to give certain Guarantees for and in connexion with the construction of a Medical Centre at Clayton to be known as the Queen Victoria Medical Centre.
Pay-roll Tax (Further Amendment) Act 1982	No. 9837	21 December 1982
An Act to further amend the Pay-roll Tax Act 1971 and for other purposes.
Mildura Irrigation and Water Trusts (Amendment) Act 1982	No. 9838	21 December 1982
An Act to amend the Mildura Irrigation and Water Trusts Act 1958 and for other purposes.
Metropolitan Fire Brigades Superannuation (Eligibility) Act 1982	No. 9839	21 December 1982
An Act to amend the Metropolitan Fire Brigades Superannuation Act 1976 (Note: Metropolitan Fire Brigades Superannuation Act 1976 (No. 8952)) with respect to the Rights of Fire Board Officers over 57 years of age to join the Metropolitan Fire Brigades Superannuation Scheme and for other purposes.
Workers Compensation (Amendment) Act 1982	No. 9840	21 December 1982
An Act to amend the Workers Compensation Act 1958.
St. Nicholas Hospital (Sale of Land) Act 1982	No. 9841	21 December 1982
An Act to provide for the Surrender to the Crown of certain Land the greater part of which is used for the purposes of the St. Nicholas Hospital, which Land is no longer required for the Purposes of a Hospital, and to enable the Sale thereof.
Land Tax (Amendment) Act 1982	No. 9842	21 December 1982
An Act to amend the Land Tax Act 1958 and for other purposes.
Equal Opportunity (Discrimination against Disabled Persons) Act 1982	No. 9843	21 December 1982
An Act to render Unlawful certain Kinds of Discrimination on the Ground of Impairment, to amend the Equal Opportunity Act 1977, (Note: Equal Opportunity Act 1977 (No. 9025)) and for other purposes.
Flood Plain Management Act 1982	No. 9844	21 December 1982
An Act to make further provision with respect to Flood Plain Management, to amend the Local Government Act 1958, the Water Act 1958, the Dandenong Valley Authority Act 1963, the Drainage of Land Act 1975 (Note: Drainage of Land Act 1975 (No. 8811)) and the Building Control Act 1981 and for other purposes.
Fisheries (Fees) Act 1982	No. 9845	21 December 1982
An Act to amend the Fisheries Act 1968 with respect to certain fees.
Energy Consumption Levy Act 1982	No. 9846	21 December 1982
An Act to impose a Levy on the Consumption of Natural Gas by large Users thereof, to provide for the Assessment and Collection of the Levy, to amend the Evidence (Commissions) Act 1982 (Note: Evidence (Commissions) Act 1982 (No. 9766)) and for other purposes.
Administration and Probate (Survival of Actions) Act 1982	No. 9847	21 December 1982
An Act to amend section 29 of the Administration and Probate Act 1958. (Note: Administration and Probate Act 1958 (No. 6191))
Director of Public Prosecutions Act 1982	No. 9848	21 December 1982
An Act to provide for the Appointment of a Director of Public Prosecutions, to repeal the Courts Administration Act 1975, (Note: Courts Administration Act 1975 (No. 8752)) to amend the Crimes Act 1958 and other Acts and for other purposes.
Melbourne College of Advanced Education Act 1982 (repealed)	No. 9849	21 December 1982
An Act to amalgamate the State College of Victoria—Institute of Early Childhood Development and the State College of Victoria at Melbourne, to establish the Melbourne College of Advanced Education and for other purposes. (Repealed by Melbourne College of Advanced Education (Amalgamation) Act 1988 (No. 61 of 1988))
Financial Institutions Duty Act 1982	No. 9850	21 December 1982
An Act to impose a Duty upon Financial Institutions and other persons in respect of certain Receipts, to provide for the Assessment and Collection of the Duty, to amend the Stamps Act 1958 and the Evidence (Commissions) Act 1982 and for other purposes.

== Sources ==
- "1982 Victorian Historical Acts". AustLII.
