= APA Group =

APA Group may refer to:

- APA Group (Australia), natural gas pipeline and electricity company
- APA Group (Azerbaijan), a media company
- APA Group (Japan), a hotel group

== See also ==
- APA (disambiguation)
