= Apas =

Apas or APAS may refer to:

- Ap (water), most commonly known as apas, the waters of Vedic mythology
- Aban, also known as apas, the waters in Iranian mythology
- Apas (biscuit), a type of Philippine biscuit
- Androgynous Peripheral Attach System, a family of spacecraft docking mechanisms
- Apas (state constituency), a state constituency in Sabah
- Apastovo (Tatar: Апас and Romanize Apas), an urban locality in the Republic of Tatarstan, Russia

== See also ==
- Apa (disambiguation)
