= List of acts of the Parliament of Victoria from 1983 =

This is a list of acts of the Parliament of Victoria, Australia for the year 1983.

== 1983 ==
Short title, or popular name	Citation	Royal assent
Long title
Wildlife (Fees) Act 1982 (Note: Although the short title of this act ends "... Act 1982", it was passed in the year 1983.)	No. 9851	5 January 1983
An Act to amend the Wildlife Act 1975 (Note: Wildlife Act 1975 (No. 8699)) to increase certain fees.
Motor Car (General Amendment) Act 1982 (repealed)	No. 9852	5 January 1983
An Act to amend generally the Motor Car Act 1958. (Note: Motor Car Act 1958 (No. 6325)) (Repealed by Statute Law Revision Act 1995 (No. 11 of 1995))
State Electricity Commission (Amendment) Act 1982	No. 9853	5 January 1983
An Act to reconstitute the State Electricity Commission, to amend the State Electricity Commission Act 1958, (Note: State Electricity Commission Act 1958 (No. 6377)) the Electric Light and Power Act 1958 (Note: Electric Light and Power Act 1958 (No. 6241)) and for other purposes.
Egg Industry Stabilization (Amendment) Act 1982	No. 9854	5 January 1983
An Act to amend the Egg Industry Stabilization Act 1973 (Note: Egg Industry Stabilization Act 1973 (No. 8406)) to restrict the transfer of licences to individual persons and prevent the accumulation of hen quotas in single holdings and for other purposes.
Revocation and Excision of Crown Reservations Act 1982	No. 9855	5 January 1983
An Act to revoke the Permanent Reservations of certain Lands and for Purposes connected therewith.
Wrongs (Dependants) Act 1982	No. 9856	5 January 1983
An Act to amend the Wrongs Act 1958 (Note: Wrongs Act 1958 (No. 6420)) and for other purposes.
State Bank (Amendment) Act 1982	No. 9857	5 January 1983
An Act to amend the State Bank Act 1958. (Note: State Savings Bank Act 1958 (No. 6379))
Sale of Land (Amendment) Act 1982	No. 9858	5 January 1983
An Act to amend the Sale of Land Act 1962, (Note: Sale of Land Act 1962 (No. 6975)) with respect to Contracts for the Sale of Land, to amend the Legal Profession Practice Act 1958, (Note: Legal Profession Practice Act 1958 (No. 6291)) the Property Law Act 1958, (Note: Property Law Act 1958 (No. 6344)) the Supreme Court Act 1958, (Note: Supreme Court Act 1958 (No. 6387)) and Transfer of Land Act 1958 (Note: Transfer of Land Act 1958 (No. 6399)) and for other purposes.
Freedom of Information Act 1982	No. 9859	5 January 1983
An Act to give the Members of the Public Rights of Access to Official Documents of the Government of Victoria and of its Agencies and for other purposes.
Human Tissue Act 1982	No. 9860	5 January 1983
An Act to make provision for and in relation to the Removal of Human Tissue for Transplantation, for Post-mortem Examinations, for the Definition of Death, for the Registration of Schools of Anatomy, to repeal certain Acts and enactments and for other purposes.
Public Account (Trust Funds) Act 1982	No. 9861	5 January 1983
An Act to provide for the transfer of moneys in certain Trust Funds in the Public Account to the Consolidated Fund, to repeal certain Acts, to make consequential Amendments to certain other Acts and for other purposes.
River Murray Waters Act 1982	No. 9862	5 January 1983
An Act to approve and provide for carrying out an Agreement entered into between the Prime Minister of the Commonwealth of Australia and the Premiers of the States of New South Wales, Victoria and South Australia respecting the River Murray and other Waters, to repeal the River Murray Waters Act 1915 (Note: River Murray Waters Act 1915 (6 Geo. V. No. 2596)) and for other purposes.
Statute Law Revision (Repeals) Act 1982 (repealed)	No. 9863	5 January 1983
An Act to revise the Statute Law of Victoria by Repealing spent Acts and for other purposes. (Repealed by Statute Law Revision Act 1995 (No. 11 of 1995))
Minerals and Energy Fees Act 1983	No. 9864	29 March 1983
An Act to amend the Mines Act 1958, (Note: Mines Act 1958 (No. 6320)) the Petroleum Act 1958, (Note: Petroleum Act 1958 (No. 6334)) the Explosives Act 1960, (Note: Explosives Act 1960 (No. 6715)) the Extractive Industries Act 1966, (Note: Extractive Industries Act 1966 (No. 7499)) the Inflammable Liquids Act 1966 (Note: Inflammable Liquids Act 1966 (No. 7512)) and the Liquefied Gases Act 1968 (Note: Liquefied Gases Act 1968 (No. 7754)) with respect to certain fees and charges and for other purposes.
Administrative Law (Amendment) Act 1983 (repealed)	No. 9865	29 March 1983
An Act to amend the Administrative Law Act 1978 (Note: Administrative Law Act 1978 (No. 9234)) and for other purposes. (Repealed by Statute Law Revision Act 1995 (No. 11 of 1995))
Local Government (Investments) Act 1983	No. 9866	29 March 1983
An Act to provide for the establishment of an Investment Service for Local Government, to amend the Municipal Association Act 1907 (Note: Municipal Association Act 1907 (7 Edw. VII. No. 2080)) and the Local Government Act 1958 (Note: Local Government Act 1958 (No. 6299)) and for other purposes.
Motor Accidents (Amendment) Act 1983	No. 9867	12 April 1983
An Act to amend the Motor Accidents Act 1973 (Note: Motor Accidents Act 1973 (No. 8429)) to extend the provisions of the Act to motor accidents occurring outside Victoria involving motor cars registered in Victoria, to provide for the entering into of agreements between the Motor Accidents Board and other similar authorities in the Commonwealth of Australia, and for other purposes.
Motor Car (Learner Drivers) Act 1983 (repealed)	No. 9868	12 April 1983
An Act to amend the Motor Car Act 1958 to extend and improve training of Learner Drivers, to make provision for Learner's Endorsements, and for other purposes. (Repealed by Statute Law Revision Act 1995 (No. 11 of 1995))
Constitution Act Amendment (Temporary Provisions) Act 1983	No. 9869	21 April 1983
An Act to amend The Constitution Act Amendment Act 1958 (Note: Constitution Act Amendment Act 1958 (No. 6224)) with respect to the conduct of the By-elections to be held for the Electoral Districts of Swan Hill and Warrnambool and the Electoral Province of East Yarra, in 1983.
Constitution (Local Government) Act 1983	No. 9870	27 April 1983
An Act to amend Part IIA. of the Constitution Act 1975 (Note: Constitution Act 1975 (No. 8750)) with respect to Municipal Council Elections, to amend the Melbourne Corporation (Election of Council) Act 1982 (Note: Melbourne Corporation (Election of Council) Act 1982 (No. 9763)) and for other purposes.
Local Government (Municipal Council Elections) Act 1983	No. 9871	27 April 1983
An Act to amend the Local Government Act 1958 with respect to Municipal Council Elections, to amend the Melbourne Corporation (Election of Council) Act 1982 and for other purposes.
Chiropodists (Amendment) Act 1983	No. 9872	27 April 1983
An Act to amend the Chiropodists Act 1968. (Note: Chiropodists Act 1968 (No. 7765))
Liquor Control (Amendment) Act 1983	No. 9873	27 April 1983
An Act to amend sections 5 and 25 of the Liquor Control Act 1968 (Note: Liquor Control Act 1968 (No. 7695)) and for other purposes.
Land Settlement (Amendment) Act 1983	No. 9874	27 April 1983
An Act to amend the Land Settlement Act 1959, (Note: Land Settlement Act 1959 (No. 6534)) to increase the amount which may be issued and applied for the purposes of that Act and for other purposes.
Juries (Amendment) Act 1983	No. 9875	3 May 1983
An Act to amend the Juries Act 1967, (Note: Juries Act 1967 (No. 7651)) to entitle the Ombudsman to be excused as of Right from serving as a Juror, to render Officers of the Ombudsman ineligible to serve as Jurors and for other purposes.
Health (Consultative Council) Act 1983	No. 9876	3 May 1983
An Act to amend the Health Act 1958 (Note: Health Act 1958 (No. 6270)) to re-constitute the Consultative Council on Maternal and Perinatal Mortality and Morbidity as the Consultative Council on Obstetric and Paediatric Mortality and Morbidity and for other purposes.
Companies (Administration) (Amendment) Act 1983	No. 9877	3 May 1983
An Act to amend the Companies (Administration) Act 1981 (Note: Companies (Administration) Act 1981 (No. 9698)) and for other purposes.
Scout Association Act 1983	No. 9878	3 May 1983
An Act to provide for the Change of Name of the Boy Scouts Association (incorporated by Royal Charter) Victorian Branch (Australia) and of the Governing Body of that Association, to amend the Boy Scouts Association Act 1932 (Note: Boy Scouts Association Act 1932 (No. 4092)) and for other purposes.
Community Welfare Services (Amendment) Act 1983	No. 9879	10 May 1983
An Act to amend the Community Welfare Services Act 1970, (Note: Social Welfare Act 1970 (No. 8089)) the Children's Court Act 1973 (Note: Children's Court Act 1973 (No. 8477)) and the Community Welfare Services Act 1978, (Note: Community Welfare Services Act 1978 (No. 9248)) and for other purposes.
Lotteries Gaming and Betting (Administration) Act 1983	No. 9880	10 May 1983
An Act to amend certain provisions of the Lotteries Gaming and Betting Act 1966 (Note: Lotteries Gaming and Betting Act 1966 (No. 7429)) with respect to the administration of that Act.
Prisoners (Interstate Transfer) Act 1983	No. 9881	10 May 1983
An Act relating to the Transfer interstate of Prisoners and for other purposes.
Decentralized Industry Incentive Payments (Amendment) Act 1983	No. 9882	10 May 1983
An Act to amend the Decentralized Industry Incentive Payments Act 1972. (Note: Decentralized Industry Incentive Payments Act 1972 (No. 8383))
Film Victoria (Amendment) Act 1983	No. 9883	10 May 1983
An Act to amend the Film Victoria Act 1981 (Note: Film Victoria Act 1981 (No. 9716)) and for other purposes.
Limitation of Actions (Personal Injury Claims) Act 1983	No. 9884	10 May 1983
An Act to make provision for Extending the Period within which Actions for Damages in respect of Personal Injuries may be brought, to amend the Limitation of Actions Act 1958, (Note: Limitation of Actions Act 1958 (No. 6295)) the Administration and Probate Act 1958 (Note: Administration and Probate Act 1958 (No. 6191)) and the Wrongs Act 1958, and for other purposes.
Business Franchise Acts (Amendment) Act 1983	No. 9885	10 May 1983
An Act to amend the Business Franchise (Tobacco) Act 1974 (Note: Business Franchise (Tobacco) Act 1974 (No. 8597)) and the Business Franchise (Petroleum Products) Act 1979 (Note: Business Franchise (Petroleum Products) Act 1979 (No. 9272)) and for other purposes.
Motor Boating (Amendment) Act 1983	No. 9886	10 May 1983
An Act to amend the Motor Boating Act 1961 (Note: Motor Boating Act 1961 (No. 6832)) to make provision for the Registration of Certain Motorized Sailing Vessels and of Air Cushion Vehicles operating over Water, and for other purposes.
Public Authorities (Contributions) (Amendment) Act 1983	No. 9887	10 May 1983
An Act to amend the Public Authorities (Contributions) Act 1966 (Note: Public Authorities (Contributions) Act 1966 (No. 7441)) with respect to the Payment by Public Authorities of Contributions in aid of the Consolidated Fund, to amend the Port of Melbourne Authority Act 1958 (Note: Melbourne Harbor Trust Act 1958 (No. 6312)) and for other purposes.
Hospital Benefits (Levy) (Amendment) Act 1983	No. 9888	17 May 1981
An Act to amend the Hospital Benefits (Levy) Act 1982. (Note: Hospital Benefits (Levy) Act 1982 (No. 9764))
Health (Radiation Safety) Act 1983	No. 9889	17 May 1981
An Act to regulate the keeping and use of radio-active substances and ionizing and non-ionizing radiation apparatus, to provide for protection against the harmful effects of radiation, to establish a Radiation Advisory Committee, a Radiographers and Radiation Technologists Registration Board, to amend the Health Act 1958 the Nuclear Activities ({Prohibitions) Act 1983 (Note: Nuclear Activities (Prohibitions) Act 1983 (No. 9923)) and for other purposes.
Historic Buildings (Amendment) Act 1983	No. 9890	17 May 1981
An Act to amend the Historic Buildings Act 1981, (Note: Historic Buildings Act 1981 (No. 9667)) to repeal the Government Buildings Advisory Council Act 1972, (Note: Government Buildings Advisory Council Act 1972 (No. 8265)) the Government Buildings Advisory Council (Amendment) Act 1981, (Note: Government Buildings Advisory Council (Amendment) Act 1981 (No. 9580)) the Planning Appeals Board Act 1980, (Note: Planning Appeals Board Act 1980 (No. 9512)) and for other purposes.
Railways (Amendment) Act 1983 (repealed)	No. 9891	31 May 1981
An Act to amend the Railways Act 1958 (Note: Railways Act 1958 (No. 6355)) with regard to the borrowing and leasing powers of the Victorian Railways Board and for other purposes. (Repealed by Transport Act 1983 (No. 9921))
Constitution (Electoral Provinces and Districts) Act 1983	No. 9892	31 May 1981
An Act to amend the Constitution Act 1975, to provide for an increase in the Number of Electoral Districts and for other purposes.
Management and Budget Act 1983	No. 9893	31 May 1981
An Act to make Provision for and in relation to the Appointment and Powers of the Director-General, Department of Management and Budget and for other purposes.
Electoral Commission (Amendment) Act 1983	No. 9894	31 May 1981
An Act to amend the Electoral Commission Act 1982. (Note: Electoral Commission Act 1982 (No. 9801))
Water and Sewerage Authorities (Restructuring) Act 1983	No. 9895	7 June 1983
An Act to provide for the Restructuring of Victoria's Urban Water and Sewerage Authorities, to empower the Creation of Water Boards capable of supplying both Water and Sewerage Services, to enable the Transfer to Municipalities of the Functions of certain Water and Sewerage Authorities, to make consequential Amendments to various Acts and for other purposes.
Geelong Waterworks and Sewerage (Bellarine Water Supply) Act 1983	No. 9896	7 June 1983
An Act to provide for the transfer of the Bellarine Water Supply System to the Geelong Waterworks and Sewerage Trust, to amend the Geelong Waterworks and Sewerage Act 1958 (Note: Geelong Waterworks and Sewerage Act 1958 (No. 6263)) and for other purposes.
Road Traffic (Amendment) Act 1983 (repealed)	No. 9897	7 June 1983
An Act to amend the Road Traffic Act 1958 (Note: Road Traffic Act 1958 (No. 6359)) to provide for the incorporation of the Road Safety and Traffic Authority, to authorize that Authority to borrow moneys and for other purposes. (Repealed by Transport Act 1983 (No. 9921))
ANZ Executors & Trustee Company Act 1983	No. 9898	7 June 1983
An Act to amend the Trustee Companies Act 1958, (Note: Trustee Companies Act 1958 (No. 6402)) to provide for the transfer to a wholly owned subsidiary of Australia and New Zealand Banking Group Limited of the trust business of The Trustees Executors & Agency Company Limited and for other purposes.
Industrial Relations (Amendment) Act 1983	No. 9899	15 June 1983
An Act to amend the Industrial Relations Act 1979. (Note: Industrial Relations Act 1979 (No. 9365))
Supply (1983-84, No. 1) Act 1983 (repealed)	No. 9900	15 June 1983
An Act to make Interim Provision for the Appropriation of Moneys out of the Consolidated Fund for the Service of the Financial Year 1983-84. (Repealed by Statute Law Revision Act 1995 (No. 11 of 1995))
Works and Services (Supply 1983-84) Act 1983	No. 9901	15 June 1983
An Act to make Interim Provision for the Appropriation of Moneys out of the Works and Services Account for certain Works and Purposes for the financial year 1983-84 and to make provision for the Appropriation of Moneys out of that Account to enable certain expenditure made under the Authority of Section 16 of the Public Account Act 1958 (Note: Public Account Act 1958 (No. 6345)) to be repaid in accordance with the requirements of that Section.
Statute Law Revision Act 1983 (repealed)	No. 9902	15 June 1983
An Act to revise the Statute Law of Victoria. (Repealed by Statute Law Revision Act 1995 (No. 11 of 1995))
Museums Act 1983	No. 9903	15 June 1983
An Act to constitute the Museums Advisory Board and the Council of the Museum of Victoria, to abolish certain other Bodies and for that purpose to amend and repeal Various Acts and for other purposes.
Grain Elevators (Amendment) Act 1983	No. 9904	21 June 1983
An Act to increase the Borrowing Powers of the Grain Elevators Board and for other purposes.
Motor Accidents (Applications) Act 1983	No. 9905	21 June 1983
An Act to alter the Period within which Applications may be made for Compensation under the Motor Accidents Act 1973, and for other purposes.
Police Regulation (Amendment) Act 1983	No. 9906	21 June 1983
An Act to amend the Police Regulation Act 1958. (Note: Police Regulation Act 1958 (No. 6338))
Mental Health (Amendment) Act 1983	No. 9907	21 June 1983
An Act to amend the Mental Health Act 1959 (Note: name-MHA1959) and for other purposes.
Historic Buildings (Further Amendment) Act 1983	No. 9908	21 June 1983
An Act to amend the Historic Buildings Act 1981, the Historic Buildings (Amendment) Act 1983 (Note: Historic Buildings (Amendment) Act 1983 (No. 9890)) and for other purposes.
Consumer Affairs Committee Act 1983	No. 9909	21 June 1983
An Act to amend the Consumer Affairs Act 1972 (Note: Consumer Protection Act 1972 (No. 8276)) so as to abolish the Consumer Affairs Council and establish the Consumer Affairs Committee, and for other purposes.
Town and Country Planning (Amendment) Act 1983 (repealed)	No. 9910	21 June 1983
An Act to amend the Town and Country Planning Act 1961, (Note: Town and Country Planning Act 1961 (No. 6849)) to amend the State Co-ordination Council Act 1975, (Note: State Co-ordination Council Act 1975 (No. 8793)) the Upper Yarra Valley and Dandenong Ranges Authority Act 1976 (Note: Upper Yarra Valley and Dandenong Ranges Authority Act 1976 (No. 8968)) and the Planning Appeals Board Act 1980 and for other purposes. (Repealed by Statute Law Revision (Repeals) Act 1999 (No. 3 of 1999))
Stamps (Amendment) Act 1983	No. 9911	21 June 1983
An Act to vary and extend the Exemptions from Stamp Duty, to remove anomalies in Stamp Duty and to make additional provisions with respect to certain interests in and dealings relating to Marketable Securities and for those purposes to amend the Stamps Act 1958 (Note: Stamps Act 1958 (No. 6375)) and the Motor Car (Mass and Dimension Limits) Act 1981 (Note: Motor Car (Mass and Dimension Limits) Act 1981 (No. 9548)) and for other purposes.
Legal Profession Practice (Solicitors' Guarantee Fund) Act 1983	No. 9912	21 June 1983
An Act to amend section 53 of the Legal Profession Practice Act 1958 and for other purpose.
Community Welfare Services (Attendance Centre Permits) Act 1983	No. 9913	21 June 1983
An Act to empower the Director-General of Community Welfare Services to permit an Offender undergoing a Term of Imprisonment in default of Payment of a Fine to serve the Term by way of Attendance at an Attendance Centre, to amend the Community Welfare Services Act 1970, the Penalties and Sentences Act 1981, (Note: Penalties and Sentences Act 1981 (No. 9554)) and for other purposes.
St. Andrew's Hospital (Guarantee) (Amendment) Act 1983	No. 9914	21 June 1983
An Act to amend the St. Andrew's Hospital (Guarantee) Act 1978 (Note: St. Andrew's Hospital (Guarantee) Act 1978 (No. 9100)) to make provision with respect to an Increase in the Sum guaranteed and for other purposes.
Supporting Parents Concession Act 1983	No. 9915	21 June 1983
An Act to amend the Motor Car Act 1958 and the Municipalities Assistance Act 1973 (Note: Municipalities Assistance Act 1973 (No. 8526)) with respect to Concessions to be made to Supporting Parents within the meaning of the Social Security Act 1947 (Note: Social Services Consolidation Act 1947 (No. 26 (Cth))) of the Commonwealth.
Administrative Arrangements Act 1983	No. 9916	21 June 1983
An Act to make Provision in relation to Changes in Administrative Arrangements with respect to Ministries, Departments and Officers of Departments and for other purposes.
Public Account (Advances) Act 1983	No. 9917	23 June 1983
An Act to amend Section 4 of the Public Account Act 1958.
Medical Practitioners (Amendment) Act 1983	No. 9918	23 June 1983
An Act to amend the Medical Practitioners Act 1970 (Note: Medical Practitioners Act 1970 (No. 8061)) generally.
Beer Prices Regulation (Temporary Provisions) Act 1983	No. 9919	23 June 1983
An Act to make temporary Provision for the Regulation of the Prices at which Beer may be sold by Breweries and for other purposes.
Rural Finance and Settlement Commission (Penalties) Act 1983	No. 9920	23 June 1983
An Act to amend the Penalties fixed under the Rural Finance and Settlement Commission Act 1961 (Note: Rural Finance and Settlement Commission Act 1961 (No. 6846)) for Offences against that Act.
Transport Act 1983 or the Transport (Compliance and Miscellaneous) Act 1983	No. 9921	23 June 1983
An Act to Re-enact with Amendments the Law relating to Transport including the Law with respect to Railways, Roads and Tramways, to repeal the Country Roads Act 1958, (Note: Country Roads Act 1958 (No. 6229)) the Melbourne and Metropolitan Tramways Act 1958, (Note: Melbourne and Metropolitan Tramways Act 1958 (No. 6311)) the Ministry of Transport Act 1958, (Note: Ministry of Transport Act 1958 (No. 6322)) the Railway Lands Acquisition Act 1958, (Note: Railway Lands Acquisition Act 1958 (No. 6354)) the Railways Act 1958, the Road Traffic Act 1958, the Transport Regulation Act 1958, (Note: Transport Regulation Act 1958 (No. 6400)) the Melbourne Underground Rail Loop Act 1970, (Note: Melbourne Underground Rail Loop Act 1970 (No. 8023)) the Recreation Vehicles Act 1973, (Note: Recreation Vehicles Act 1973 (No. 8407)) the Railway Construction and Property Board Act 1979 (Note: Railway Construction and Property Board Act 1979 (No. 9345)) and certain other Acts, to make consequential amendments to various Acts and for other purposes.
Revocation and Excision of Crown Reservations Act 1983	No. 9922	23 June 1983
An Act to revoke the Permanent Reservations of certain Lands and for Purposes connected therewith.
Nuclear Activities (Prohibitions) Act 1983	No. 9923	23 June 1983
An Act to prohibit in Victoria certain activities associated with the nuclear fuel cycle, to amend the State Electricity Commission Act 1958, the Electric Light and Power Act 1958, and the Mines Act 1958 and for other purposes.
Racing (Amendment) Act 1983 (repealed)	No. 9924	23 June 1983
An Act to establish the Racing Appeals Tribunal and to further amend the Racing Act 1958 (Note: Racing Act 1958 (No. 6353)) with respect to the regulation of race-meetings, the distribution of commission by the Totalizator Agency Board, the application of the Race-courses Development Fund, betting on greyhound races, and for other purposes. (Repealed by Statute Law Revision Act 1995 (No. 11 of 1995))
Estate Agents (Reconstitution) Act 1983	No. 9925	23 June 1983
An Act to amend the Estate Agents Act 1980 (Note: Estate Agents Act 1980 (No. 9428)) with respect to the Constitution of the Estate Agents Board, the Qualifications for Persons applying for Estate Agents Licences and for other purposes.
Pipelines (Amendment) Act 1983	No. 9926	23 June 1983
An Act to amend the Pipelines Act 1967 (Note: Pipelines Act 1967 (No. 7541)) and for other purposes.
State Insurance Office (Extension of Franchise) Act 1983	No. 9927	23 June 1983
An Act to amend the State Insurance Office Act 1975 (Note: State Insurance Office Act 1975 (No. 8727)) to extend the Franchise of the State Insurance Office and for other purposes.
Fire Authorities Act 1983	No. 9928	28 June 1983
An Act to amend the Country Fire Authority Act 1958, (Note: Country Fire Authority Act 1958 (No. 6228)) the Metropolitan Fire Brigades Act 1958, (Note: Metropolitan Fire Brigades Act 1958 (No. 6315)) the Metropolitan Fire Brigades Superannuation Act 1976 (Note: Metropolitan Fire Brigades Superannuation Act 1976 (No. 8952)) and Section 12 of the Summary Offences Act 1966. (Note: Summary Offences Act 1966 (No. 7405))
State Board of Education Act 1983	No. 9929	28 June 1983
An Act to establish a State Board of Education, and for other purposes.
Barley Marketing (Amendment) Act 1983	No. 9930	28 June 1983
An Act to amend the Barley Marketing Act 1958 (Note: Barley Marketing Act 1958 (No. 6206)) and for other purposes.
Liquor Control Act 1983 (repealed)	No. 9931	28 June 1983
An Act to amend the Liquor Control Act 1968 and for other purposes. (Repealed by Statute Law Revision Act 1995 (No. 11 of 1995))
Firearms (Amendment) Act 1983	No. 9932	28 June 1983
An Act to amend the Firearms Act 1958. (Note: Firearms Act 1958 (No. 6251))
Post-Secondary Education (Amendment) Act 1983	No. 9933	28 June 1983
An Act to provide for the Better Development and Coordination of Technical and Further Education in Victoria, to establish a Technical and Further Education Board, to amend the Post-Secondary Education Act 1978 (Note: Post-Secondary Education Act 1978 (No. 9145)) and other Acts, and for other purposes.
Hospitals and Charities (Committees of Management) Act 1983	No. 9934	5 July 1983
An act to amend the Hospitals and Charities Act 1958, (Note: Hospitals and Charities Act 1958 (No. 6274)) the Health Act 1958 and the Cancer Act 1958 (Note: Cancer Act 1958 (No. 6213)) to facilitate employee representation on hospital committees of management, to provide for a retirement age of 72 years for members of those committees, to make provision relating to the disclosure of information by specified persons, and for other purposes.
Construction Industry Long Service Leave Act 1983	No. 9935	5 July 1983
An Act to make special Provision in relation to Long Service Leave for Persons employed in the Construction Industry, to re-enact with amendments the Building Industry Long Service Leave Act 1975, (Note: Building Industry Long Service Leave Act 1975 (No. 8693)) to repeal the Construction Industry (Electrical and Metal Trades) Long Service Leave Act 1982, (Note: Construction Industry (Electrical and Metal Trades) Long Service Leave Act 1982 (No. 9825)) to amend certain other Acts, and for other purposes.
Mines (Amendment) Act 1983	No. 9936	5 July 1983
An Act to amend the Mines Act 1958, the Crown Land (Reserves) Act 1978, (Note: Crown Land (Reserves) Act 1978 (No. 9212)) the Extractive Industries Act 1966, the Explosives Act 1960, the Forests Act 1958, (Note: Forests Act 1958 (No. 6254)) the Groundwater Act 1969, (Note: Groundwater Act 1969 (No. 7849)) the Inflammable Liquids Act 1966, the Liquefied Gases Act 1968, the Mining Development Act 1958, (Note: Mining Development Act 1958 (No. 6321)) the National Parks Act 1975, (Note: National Parks Act 1975 (No. 8702)) the Petroleum Act 1958, and the Town and Country Planning Act 1961 and for other purposes.
Constitution (Corporations' Franchise) Act 1983	No. 9937	9 September 1983
An Act to make provision with respect to the franchise for certain corporations in municipal elections, to amend the Constitution Act 1975, and for other purposes.
Superannuation (Fund Contributions) Act 1983	No. 9938	13 September 1983
An Act to amend the Superannuation Act 1958 (Note: Superannuation Act 1958 (No. 6386)) and Section 8C of the Pensions Supplementation Act 1966. (Note: Pensions Supplementation Act 1966 (No. 7417))
Crown Intellectual Property (Assignment) Act 1983 (repealed)	No. 9939	13 September 1983
An Act to authorize the Treasurer of Victoria to assign certain copyright and trade marks and for other purposes. (Repealed by Treasury Legislation (Repeal) Act 2005 (No. 73 of 2005))
Associations Incorporation (Amendment) Act 1983 (repealed)	No. 9940	13 September 1983
An Act to provide for the payment of certain fees under the Associations Incorporation Act 1981, (Note: Associations Incorporation Act 1981 (No. 9713)) to exempt from stamp duty certain instruments giving effect to the vesting of land in incorporated associations, for those purposes to amend the Associations Incorporation Act 1981 and for other purposes. (Repealed by Statute Law Revision Act 1995 (No. 11 of 1995))
Annual Reporting Act 1983 (repealed)	No. 9941	20 September 1983
An Act to provide for the reporting to Parliament annually of Ministers in relation to Departments of the Public Service and of Public Bodies, and for other purposes. (Repealed by Financial Management Act 1994 (No. 18 of 1994))
Nudity (Prescribed Areas) Act 1983	No. 9942	20 September 1983
An Act to permit nudity in certain public places.
State Film Centre of Victoria Council Act 1983	No. 9943	20 September 1983
An Act to establish the State Film Centre of Victoria Council and to make provision for the management and operation of the State Film Centre, to amend the Ministry for the Arts Act 1972 (Note: Ministry for the Arts Act 1972 (No. 8357)) and for other purposes
Victorian Prison Industries Commission Act 1983	No. 9944	20 September 1983
An Act to establish a Victorian Prison Industries Commission, to amend the Community Welfare Services Act 1970 and for other purposes.
Penalties and Sentences (Amendment) Act 1983	No. 9945	20 September 1983
An Act to further amend the Law relating to Penalties and Sentences, to amend the Penalties and Sentences Act 1981 and other Acts and for other purposes.
Fisheries (Amendment) Act 1983	No. 9946	27 September 1983
An Act to amend the Fisheries Act 1968 (Note: Fisheries Act 1968 (No. 7780)) to provide for the Payment of Moneys into the Victorian Fishing Industry Trust Fund, the Payment of a Surcharge on Licences issued under that Act and for the Issue of Fish Traders' Licences and to amend Section 72 of the said Act.
Instruments (Bills of Exchange) Act 1983	No. 9947	27 September 1983
An Act to amend the Instruments Act 1958 (Note: Instruments Act 1958 (No. 6279)) to increase the time limits for the giving of leave to defend actions on bills of exchange, to extend the application of the procedure for actions on such bills to Magistrates' Courts and for that purpose to amend the Magistrates (Summary Proceedings) Act 1975, (Note: Magistrates (Summary Proceedings) Act 1975 (No. 8731)) to amend the County Court Act 1958, (Note: County Court Act 1958 (No. 6230)) and for other purposes.
Medical Practitioners (Conditional Registration) Act 1983	No. 9948	27 September 1983
An Act to amend the Medical Practitioners Act 1970 with respect to conditional medical registrations.
Local Authorities Superannuation (Amendment) Act 1983	No. 9949	18 October 1983
An Act to amend the Local Authorities Superannuation Act 1958 (Note: Local Authorities Superannuation Act 1958 (No. 6298)) to enable it to remain consistent with other superannuation schemes and for other purposes.
Vermin and Noxious Weeds (Re-organization) Act 1983	No. 9950	18 October 1983
An Act to amend the Vermin and Noxious Weeds Act 1958. (Note: Vermin and Noxious Weeds Act 1958 (No. 6409))
Labour and Industry (Shop Trading) Act 1983	No. 9951	21 October 1983
An Act to make further provision in relation to shop trading hours and for that purpose to amend the Labour and Industry Act 1958 (Note: Labour and Industry Act 1958 (No. 6283)) and for other purposes.
Zoological Parks and Gardens (Amendment) Act 1983	No. 9952	21 October 1983
An Act to amend the Zoological Parks and Gardens Act 1967 (Note: Zoological Gardens Act 1967 (No. 7518)) to enable the appointment of an additional Member to the Zoological Board of Victoria, to vary the requirements relating to Borrowing, Investment and Financial Reporting by that Board and with respect to Penalties for Breaches of Regulations under that Act and for other purposes.
Chattel Securities (Amendment) Act 1983	No. 9953	2 November 1983
An Act to amend the Chattel Securities Act 1981 (Note: Chattel Securities Act 1981 (No. 9650)) and for other purposes.
Small Claims Tribunals (Amendment) Act 1983	No. 9954	2 November 1983
An Act to amend the Small Claims Tribunals Act 1973 (Note: Small Claims Tribunals Act 1973 (No. 8486)) and for other purposes.
Director-General of Conservation, Forests and Lands Act 1983	No. 9955	2 November 1983
An Act to provide for the Appointment of a Director-General of Conservation, Forests and Lands.
Border Railways Act 1983 (repealed)	No. 9956	15 November 1983
An Act to amend the Border Railways Act 1922 (Note: Border Railways Act 1922 (13 Geo. V. No. 3194)) and for other purposes. (Repealed by Statute Law Revision Act 1995 (No. 11 of 1995))
County Court (Jurisdiction) Act 1983	No. 9957	15 November 1983
An Act to amend the County Court Act 1958 with respect to the appointment of Acting Judges, the jurisdiction of the County Court and for other purposes.
Appropriation (1983-84, No. 1) Act 1983 (repealed)	No. 9958	15 November 1983
An Act to appropriate certain Sums out of the Consolidated Fund for the Service of the Financial Year 1983-84 and to appropriate the Supplies granted in this Session of Parliament and for other purposes. (Repealed by Statute Law Revision Act 1995 (No. 11 of 1995))
Constitution (Judges) Act 1983	No. 9959	22 November 1983
An Act to amend section 75 (2) of the Constitution Act 1975.
Parole Orders (Transfer) Act 1983	No. 9960	22 November 1983
An Act relating to the reciprocal Enforcement of Parole Orders.
Consumer Affairs (Product Safety) Act 1983	No. 9961	22 November 1983
An Act to amend the Consumer Affairs Act 1972 to provide for the Making by the Minister of Orders prohibiting the Supply of certain Goods and for other purposes.
Summer Time (Amendment) Act 1983 (repealed)	No. 9962	22 November 1983
An Act To amend the Summer Time Act 1972. (Note: Summer Time Act 1972 (No. 8297)) (Repealed by Statute Law Revision Act 1995 (No. 11 of 1995))
State Co-ordination Council (Repeal) Act 1983 (repealed)	No. 9963	22 November 1983
An Act to repeal the State Co-ordination Council Act 1975 and to amend the Town and Country Planning Act 1961 and the Upper Yarra Valley and Dandenong Ranges Authority Act 1976 and for other purposes. (Repealed by Statute Law Revision Act 1995 (No. 11 of 1995))
Liquor Control (Booth Licences) Act 1983	No. 9964	22 November 1983
An Act to amend the Liquor Control Act 1968 with respect to Booth Licences and for other purposes.
Business Franchise Acts (Further Amendment) Act 1983	No. 9965	22 November 1983
An Act to amend the Business Franchise Acts with respect to Fees and Refunds and for other purposes.
Community Welfare Services (Director-General of Corrections) Act 1983	No. 9966	22 November 1983
An Act to make provision with respect to the functions of the Director-General of Corrections and the Office of Corrections, and for that purpose to amend the Community Welfare Services Act 1970, the Crimes Act 1958 (Note: Crimes Act 1958 (No. 6231)) and the Penalties and Sentences Act 1981 and the Prisoners (Interstate Transfer) Act 1983, (Note: Prisoners (Interstate Transfer) Act 1983 (No. 9881)) and for other purposes.
Penalty Interest Rates Act 1983	No. 9967	22 November 1983
An Act to amend the Supreme Court Act 1958, the County Court Act 1958, the Property Law Act 1958, the Transfer of Land Act 1958 and the Magistrates' Courts Act 1971 (Note: Magistrates' Courts Act 1971 (No. 8184)) with respect to the Payment of Interest on certain unpaid Moneys, to make Provision for Rates of Interest payable under certain Instruments and for Purposes connected therewith.
Community Welfare Services (Pre-Release Programme) Act 1983	No. 9968	22 November 1983
An Act to provide for a community-based pre-release programme to better integrate prisoners back into the community during the final portion of their prison sentences, to amend the Community Welfare Services Act 1970 and the Penalties and Sentences Act 1981 and for other purposes.
Land Tax Act 1983 (repealed)	No. 9969	22 November 1983
An Act to amend the Land Tax Act 1958 (Note: Land Tax Act 1958 (No. 6289)) and for other purposes. (Repealed by Statute Law Revision Act 1995 (No. 11 of 1995))
Public Lands and Works (Amendment) Act 1983	No. 9970	22 November 1983
An Act to amend the Public Lands and Works Act 1964 (Note: Public Lands and Works Act 1964 (No. 7228)) to extend the powers of delegation of the Minister of Public Works; to enable other Ministers of the Crown to authorize repairs to buildings for which they are responsible, and for other purposes.
Works and Services Appropriation Act 1983	No. 9971	22 November 1983
An Act with respect to the Appropriation of Moneys out of the Works and Services Account for certain Works and Purposes.
Tattersall Consultations Act 1983 (repealed)	No. 9972	22 November 1983
An Act to amend the Tattersall Consultations Act 1958 (Note: Tattersall Consultations Act 1958 (No. 6390)) and for other purposes. (Repealed by Statute Law Revision Act 1995 (No. 11 of 1995))
Legal Profession Practice (Amendment) Act 1983	No. 9973	22 November 1983
An Act to amend the Legal Profession Practice Act 1958 and for other purposes.
Alpine Resorts Act 1983	No. 9974	29 November 1983
An Act to make Provision for the Establishment of an Alpine Resorts Commission, to make Provision with respect to the Powers, Duties and Functions of that Commission and the Development, Management and Improvement of Alpine Resorts, to amend the Forests Act 1958, the Local Government Act 1958, to repeal the Mount Hotham Alpine Resort Act 1972 (Note: Mt. Hotham Alpine Resort Act 1972 (No. 8260)) and for other purposes.
Police Regulation (Police Reservists) Act 1983	No. 9975	29 November 1983
An Act to amend the Police Regulation Act 1958 in respect of payments to police reservists, and for other purposes.
Transfer of Land (Amendment) Act 1983	No. 9976	29 November 1983
An Act to amend the Transfer of Land Act 1958 and for other purposes.
Mental Health (Further Amendment) Act 1983	No. 9977	29 November 1983
An Act to further amend the Mental Health Act 1959 (Note: name-MHA1959) and for other purposes.
State Employees Retirement Benefits (Amendment) Act 1983	No. 9978	29 November 1983
An Act to amend the State Employees Retirement Benefits Act 1979 (Note: State Employees Retirement Benefits Act 1979 (No. 9363)) and for other purposes.
Hospitals Superannuation (Amendment) Act 1983	No. 9979	29 November 1983
An Act to amend the Hospitals Superannuation Act 1965, (Note: Hospitals Superannuation Act 1965 (No. 7354)) and for other purposes.
Labour and Industry (Fees) Act 1983	No. 9980	29 November 1983
An Act to amend the Labour and Industry Act 1958 with respect to Fees and for other purposes.
Firearms (Further Amendment) Act 1983	No. 9981	29 November 1983
An Act to further amend the Firearms Act 1958, to amend the Firearms (Amendment) Act 1983, (Note: Firearms (Amendment) Act 1983 (No. 9932)) and for other purposes.
Business Franchise (Tobacco) (Amendment) Act 1983	No. 9982	29 November 1983
An Act to make provision for fees in border areas of Victoria, to amend the Business Franchise (Tobacco) Act 1974 and for other purposes.
Latrobe Regional Commission Act 1983	No. 9983	6 December 1983
An Act to make Provision with respect to the Planning and Development of the Latrobe Region, to establish the Latrobe Regional Commission and for other purposes.
Transport (Borrowing Agency) Act 1983 (repealed)	No. 9984	6 December 1983
An Act to amend the Transport Act 1983 (Note: Transport Act 1983 (No. 9921)) to empower the Victoria Transport Borrowing Agency to borrow Money as Principal or as Agent for certain Authorities and to purchase certain Land and for other purposes. (Repealed by Statute Law Revision Act 1995 (No. 11 of 1995))
Werribee Shire Hall Act 1983 (repealed)	No. 9985	6 December 1983
An Act to repeal the Wyndham Shire Hall Act 1892. (Note: Wyndham Shire Hall Act 1892 (56 Vict. No. 1277)) (Repealed by Statute Law Revision Act 1995 (No. 11 of 1995))
Probate Duty (Amendment) Act 1983	No. 9986	6 December 1983
An Act to make further amendment to the Probate Duty Act 1962 (Note: Probate Duty Act 1962 (No. 6890)) consequential on the abolition of probate duty and for other purposes.
Eltham Land (Amendment) Act 1983	No. 9987	6 December 1983
An Act to amend the Eltham Land Act 1975 (Note: Eltham Land Act 1975 (No. 8735)) and for other purposes.
Environment Protection (Amendment) Act 1983	No. 9988	6 December 1983
An Act to amend the Environment Protection Act 1970. (Note: Environment Protection Act 1970 (No. 8056))
Energy Consumption Levy (Amendment) Act 1983	No. 9989	6 December 1983
An Act relating to assessments under the Energy Consumption Levy Act 1982 (Note: Energy Consumption Levy Act 1982 (No. 9846)) and interest rates under that Act and for those purposes to amend that Act and for other purposes.
Melbourne Cricket Ground Act 1983 or the Melbourne Cricket Ground (Amendment) Act 1983	No. 9990	6 December 1983
An Act relating to a Ground known as the Melbourne Cricket Ground and to the Trustees of the Melbourne Cricket Ground and to amend the Melbourne Cricket Ground Act 1933. (Note: Melbourne Cricket Ground Act 1933 (No. 4149))
Stamps (Further Amendment) Act 1983	No. 9991	9 December 1983
An Act to amend the Stamps Act 1958, section 21B of the Motor Car Act 1958, the Stamps (Amendment) Act 1978 (Note: Stamps (Amendment) Act 1978 (No. 9120)) and the Motor Car (Mass and Dimension Limits) Act 1981 and for other purposes.
Criminal Injuries Compensation Act 1983	No. 9992	13 December 1983
An Act to Re-enact with Amendments the Law relating to Compensation for Persons injured by Criminal Acts and Compensation for Dependants of Persons killed by Criminal Acts, to repeal the Criminal Injuries Compensation Act 1972 (Note: Criminal Injuries Compensation Act 1972 (No. 8359)) and for other purposes.
Education (Amendment) Act 1983 (repealed)	No. 9993	13 December 1983
An Act to amend the Education Act 1958, (Note: Education Act 1958 (No. 6240)) the Education (Amendment) Act 1981, (Note: Education (Amendment) Act 1981 (No. 9582)) the Forests Act 1958 and the Workers Compensation Act 1958, (Note: Workers Compensation Act 1958 (No. 6419)) and for other purposes. (Repealed by Legislation Reform (Repeals No. 2) Act 2008 (No. 16 of 2008))
Water (Delegation of Powers) Act 1983 (repealed)	No. 9994	13 December 1983
An Act to amend the Water Act 1958 (Note: Water Act 1958 (No. 6413)) and the Water Resources Act 1975 (Note: Water Resources Act 1975 (No. 8729)) to permit the delegation of certain powers. (Repealed by Water (Central Management Restructuring) Act 1984 (No. 10081))
Occupiers' Liability Act 1983 (repealed)	No. 9995	13 December 1995
An Act relating to the Standard of Care owed by Occupiers and Landlords of Premises to Persons on the Premises, to amend the Wrongs Act 1958 and for other purposes. (Repealed by Statute Law Revision Act 1995 (No. 11 of 1995))
Water (Amendment) Act 1983	No. 9996	13 December 1995
An Act to amend the Water Act 1958 in relation to the Powers of the State Rivers and Water Supply Commission and for other purposes.
Films (Amendment) Act 1983	No. 9997	13 December 1995
An Act to amend the Films Act 1971 (Note: Films Act 1971 (No. 8161)) to provide for the classification of video films, and the regulation of the distribution of films, to amend the Police Offences Act 1958, (Note: Police Offences Act 1958 (No. 6337)) and for other purposes.
Motor Car Traders (Amendment) Act 1983 (repealed)	No. 9998	13 December 1983
An Act to amend the Motor Car Traders Act 1973 (Note: Motor Car Traders Act 1973 (No. 8408)) with respect to trading in motor cars by wholesale and auction and with respect to motor car traders trading as agents, and for other purposes. (Repealed by Statute Law Revision Act 1995 (No. 11 of 1995))
Melbourne and Metropolitan Board of Works (Amendment) Act 1983	No. 9999	13 December 1983
An Act to amend the Melbourne and Metropolitan Board of Works Act 1958 (Note: Melbourne and Metropolitan Board of Works Act 1958 (No. 6310)) generally in relation to the extent and effectiveness of the operations of the Melbourne and Metropolitan Board of Works, and for other purposes.
Industrial Relations (Further Amendment) Act 1983	No. 10000	13 December 1983
An Act to further amend the Industrial Relations Act 1979 and for other purposes.
State Electricity Commission (Clearance of Lines) Act 1983 (repealed)	No. 10001	13 December 1983
An Act to amend the State Electricity Commission Act 1958 to require occupiers of land and other persons to maintain electric lines and to keep trees clear of those lines, for that purpose to provide for a Code of Practice and for other purposes. (Repealed by Statute Law Revision Act 1995 (No. 11 of 1995))
Drugs Poisons and Controlled Substances (Amendment) Act 1983	No. 10002	13 December 1983
An Act to amend the Drugs Poisons and Controlled Substances Act 1981, (Note: Drugs, Poisons and Controlled Substances Act 1981 (No. 9719)) the Alcoholics and Drug Dependent Persons (Amendment) Act 1981, (Note: Alcoholics and Drug-dependent Persons (Amendment) Act 1981 (No. 9656)) the Medical Practitioners Act 1970, the Bail Act 1977 (Note: Bail Act 1977 (No. 9008)) and the Vagrancy Act 1966 (Note: Vagrancy Act 1966 (No. 7393)) to make further Provision with respect to Offences involving Drugs of Dependence and other Matters.
Public Authorities (Dividends) Act 1983	No. 10003	13 December 1983
An Act to require certain Public Authorities to pay Dividends to the State, to amend the Public Authorities (Contributions) Act 1966, the Public Authorities (Contributions) (Amendment) Act 1983 (Note: Public Authorities (Contributions) (Amendment) Act 1983 (No. 9887)) and the Port of Melbourne Authority Act 1958 and for other purposes.
Country Fire Authority (Amendment) Act 1983 (repealed)	No. 10004	13 December 1983
An Act to amend the Country Fire Authority Act 1958 in relation to fire suppression and prevention, lighting fires during fire danger periods and compensation to casual fire-fighters, and for other purposes. (Repealed by Statute Law Revision Act 1995 (No. 11 of 1995))
State Bank (Amendment) Act 1983	No. 10005	13 December 1983
An Act to amend the State Bank Act 1958 with respect to the Borrowing Powers of The Commissioners of the State Bank of Victoria and the Payment by the Commissioners of Contributions in aid of the Consolidated Fund, to amend the Stamps Act 1958 and for other purposes.
Fisheries (Further Amendment) Act 1983	No. 10006	13 December 1983
An Act to further amend the Fisheries Act 1968 and for other purposes.
Magistrates (Summary Proceedings) (Warrants of Distress) Act 1983	No. 10007	13 December 1983
An Act to make further provision with respect to Warrants of Distress, to amend the Magistrates (Summary Proceedings) Act 1975 (Note: Magistrates (Summary Proceedings) Act 1975 (No. 8731)) and for other purposes.
Port Fairy Land Act 1983	No. 10008	13 December 1983
An Act to provide for the vesting in the Crown of certain land abutting the wharf on the Moyne River at Port Fairy.
Pay-roll Tax (Amendment) Act 1983	No. 10009	13 December 1983
An Act to amend the Pay-roll Tax Act 1971 (Note: Pay-roll Tax Act 1971 (No. 8154)) and for other purposes.
State Disasters Act 1983	No. 10010	13 December 1983
An Act to make Provision with respect to the Co-ordination of the functions of all Government Agencies and Officers in relation to the Combating of Disasters, and for other purposes.
Land (Amendment) Act 1983	No. 10011	13 December 1983
An Act to amend the Land Act 1958, (Note: Land Act 1958 (No. 6284)) and for other purposes.
Legal Profession Practice (Further Amendment) Act 1983	No. 10012	13 December 1983
An Act to amend the Legal Profession Practice Act 1958 and the Summary Offences Act 1966 with respect to moneys collected under those Acts and for other purposes.
Courts (Powers of Investment) Act 1983	No. 10013	13 December 1983
An Act to amend the County Court Act 1958, the Supreme Court Act 1958 and the Magistrates' Courts Act 1971 to authorize the Investment of Moneys held by the Courts under those Acts and to provide for the Payment of Interest into the Consolidated Fund and for other purposes.
Racing (Further Amendment) Act 1983	No. 10014	13 December 1983
An Act to amend the Racing Act 1958 with respect to the membership of the Totalizator Agency Board and the appointment of the principal administrative officers and other officers of the Harness Racing Board, the Greyhound Racing Control Board and the Totalizator Agency Board, and for other purposes.
Liquor Control (Fees) Act 1983	No. 10015	13 December 1983
An Act to amend provisions of the Liquor Control Act 1968 relating to certain licences and for other purposes.
Pensioners Rates Remission Act 1983	No. 10016	13 December 1983
An Act relating to the Calculation of the Entitlement to the Remission of Rates for certain Pensioners, to amend the Health Act 1958, the Local Government Act 1958 and for other purposes.
Water (Borrowing Powers) Act 1983	No. 10017	13 December 1983
An Act to amend the Water Act 1958 with respect to Borrowings.
Employment Agents Act 1983	No. 10018	13 December 1983
An Act to make provision for the licensing and regulation of employment agents, to amend the Market Court Act 1978, (Note: Market Court Act 1978 (No. 9196)) the Small Claims Tribunals Act 1973, the Consumer Affairs Act 1972 and the Ministry of Consumer Affairs Act 1973 (Note: Ministry of Consumer Affairs Act 1973 (No. 8442)) with respect to employment and employment agents, and for other purposes.
Local Government (General Amendment) Act 1983	No. 10019	13 December 1983
An Act to make further provision with respect to Municipal Council Powers, to amend the Local Government Act 1958, to make consequential amendments to certain other Acts and for other purposes.
Housing Act 1983	No. 10020	13 December 1983
An Act to modernize housing law, to improve housing administration in Victoria, to repeal the Housing Act 1958 (Note: Housing Act 1958 (No. 6275)) and the Home Finance Act 1962 (Note: Home Finance Act 1962 (No. 6933)) and certain other Acts, to make consequential amendments to various Acts and for other purposes.
State Electricity Commission (Brown Coal Royalty) Act 1983 (repealed)	No. 10021	13 December 1983
An Act to amend the State Electricity Commission Act 1958 with respect to the Payments to be Transferred to the Consolidated Fund by the State Electricity Commission in respect of Coal produced from Brown Coal Workings or State Coal Mines and for other purposes. (Repealed by Statute Law Revision Act 1995 (No. 11 of 1995))
Health Commission (Amendment) Act 1983	No. 10022	13 December 1983
An Act to amend the Health Commission Act 1977, (Note: Health Commission Act 1977 (No. 9023)) and for other purposes.
Motor Car (Penalties) Act 1983 (repealed)	No. 10023	13 December 1983
An Act to enable the Admission in certain Proceedings of Evidence of the recording of Demerit Points, to provide for Mandatory Suspension of Licence in relation to certain Speeding Offences and to remove Doubt as to Penalties for certain other Offences, and for those Purposes to amend the Motor Car Act 1958 and the Motor Car (Penalties) Act 1982 (Note: Motor Car (Penalties) Act 1982 (No. 9802)) and for other purposes. (Repealed by Statute Law Revision Act 1995 (No. 11 of 1995))
Egg Industry Stabilization Act 1983 (repealed)	No. 10024	13 December 1983
An Act to re-enact with Amendments the Law relating to and providing for the Stabilization of the Egg Industry, to repeal the Egg Industry Stabilization Act 1973 and for other purposes. (Repealed by Egg Industry Act 1989 (No. 49 of 1989))
Geelong Market Site Act 1983	No. 10025	20 December 1983
An Act to facilitate the redevelopment of the market site in Geelong, to repeal certain Acts and for other purposes.
Crimes (Procedure) Act 1983	No. 10026	20 December 1983
An Act to facilitate the Hearing of Trials in the Supreme Court and County Court, for that purpose to amend the Crimes Act 1958 and for other purposes.
Trustee Companies (Amendment) Act 1983	No. 10027	20 December 1983
An Act to amend the Trustee Companies Act 1958 and for other purposes.
Estate Agents (Amendment) Act 1983 (repealed)	No. 10028	20 December 1983
An Act to amend the Estate Agents Act 1980, the Trustee Companies Act 1958 and the Estate Agents (Reconstitution) Act 1983 (Note: Estate Agents (Reconstitution) Act 1983 (No. 9925)) and for other purposes. (Repealed by Statute Law Revision (Repeals) Act 1999 (No. 3 of 1999))
Teaching Service Act 1983 (repealed)	No. 10029	20 December 1983
An Act to establish the Teaching Service, to amend the Education Service Act 1981, (Note: Education Service Act 1981 (No. 9714)) the Post-Secondary Education Act 1978, the Education Act 1958, the Constitution Act 1975, The Constitution Act Amendment Act 1958, the Public Service Act 1974 (Note: Public Service Act 1974 (No. 8658)) and certain other Acts, and for other purposes. (Repealed by Legislation Reform (Repeals No. 2) Act 2008 (No. 16 of 2008))

== Sources ==
- "1983 Victorian Historical Acts". AustLII.
