= List of acts of the Parliament of Victoria from 2012 =

This is a list of acts of the Parliament of Victoria, Australia for the year 2012.

== 2012 ==
Short title, or popular name	Citation	Royal assent
Long title
City of Greater Geelong Amendment Act 2012	No. 1 of 2012	14 February 2012
An Act to amend the City of Greater Geelong Act 1993 (Note: City of Greater Geelong Act 1993 (No. 16 of 1993)) and for other purposes.
Planning and Environment Amendment (Schools) Act 2012	No. 2 of 2012	
Public Prosecutions Amendment Act 2012	No. 3 of 2012	
Evidence (Miscellaneous Provisions) Amendment (Affidavits) Act 2012	No. 4 of 2012	
Emergency Services Legislation Amendment Act 2012	No. 5 of 2012	
Freedom of Information Amendment (Freedom of Information Commissioner) Act 2012	No. 6 of 2012	
Parks and Crown Land Legislation Amendment Act 2012	No. 7 of 2012	
Port Management Amendment (Port of Melbourne Corporation Licence Fee) Act 2012	No. 8 of 2012	
Building Amendment Act 2012	No. 9 of 2012	
Carers Recognition Act 2012	No. 10 of 2012	
City of Melbourne Amendment (Environmental Upgrade Agreements) Act 2012	No. 11 of 2012	
Control of Weapons and Firearms Acts Amendment Act 2012	No. 12 of 2012	
Independent Broad-based Anti-corruption Commission Amendment (Investigative Functions) Act 2012	No. 13 of 2012	
Drugs, Poisons and Controlled Substances Amendment (Supply by Midwives) Act 2012	No. 14 of 2012	
Legal Profession and Public Notaries Amendment Act 2012	No. 15 of 2012	
Port Bellarine Tourist Resort (Repeal) Act 2012	No. 16 of 2012	
Water Amendment (Governance and Other Reforms) Act 2012	No. 17 of 2012	
Accident Compensation Amendment (Repayments and Dividends) Act 2012	No. 18 of 2012	
Victorian Inspectorate Amendment Act 2012	No. 19 of 2012	
Associations Incorporation Reform Act 2012	No. 20 of 2012	1 May 2012
An Act to re-enact the law providing for the incorporation of voluntary associations and the registration of other bodies as incorporated associations and to make provision for the corporate governance, financial accountability and other matters relating to the rules and membership of those associations, to repeal the Associations Incorporation Act 1981 (Note: Associations Incorporation Act 1981 (No. 9713)) and for other purposes.
Australian Consumer Law and Fair Trading Act 2012	No. 21 of 2012	8 May 2012
An Act to re-enact with amendments laws relating to fair trading and consumer protection, to regulate certain businesses, to repeal the Fair Trading Act 1999, (Note: Fair Trading Act 1999 (No. 16 of 1999)) the Disposal of Uncollected Goods Act 1961, (Note: Disposal of Uncollected Goods Act 1961 (No. 6815)) the Carriers and Innkeepers Act 1958 (Note: Carriers and Innkeepers Act 1958 (No. 6214)) and the Landlord and Tenant Act 1958, (Note: Landlord and Tenant Act 1958 (No. 6285)) to make related and consequential amendments to other Acts and for other purposes.
Disability Amendment Act 2012	No. 22 of 2012	
Justice Legislation Amendment Act 2012	No. 23 of 2012	
Land (Revocation of Reservations) Act 2012	No. 24 of 2012	
Royal Women's Hospital Land Act 2012	No. 25 of 2012	
Courts and Sentencing Legislation Amendment Act 2012	No. 26 of 2012	
Health Professions Registration (Repeal) Act 2012	No. 27 of 2012	
Independent Broad-based Anti-corruption Commission Amendment (Examinations) Act 2012	No. 28 of 2012	
Primary Industries Legislation Amendment Act 2012	No. 29 of 2012	
Statute Law Repeals Act 2012	No. 30 of 2012	29 May 2012
An Act to repeal certain spent Acts.
City of Melbourne Amendment (Enrolment) Act 2012	No. 31 of 2012	
Gambling Legislation Amendment (Transition) Act 2012	No. 32 of 2012	
Monetary Units Amendment Act 2012	No. 33 of 2012	
Parliamentary Salaries and Superannuation Amendment (Salary Restraint) Act 2012	No. 34 of 2012	
Police and Emergency Management Legislation Amendment Act 2012	No. 35 of 2012	
Appropriation (2012/2013) Act 2012	No. 36 of 2012	
Appropriation (Parliament 2012/2013) Act 2012	No. 37 of 2012	
Duties Amendment (Landholder) Act 2012	No. 38 of 2012	
Education Legislation Amendment (VET Sector, Universities and Other Matters) Act 2012	No. 39 of 2012	
Health (Commonwealth State Funding Arrangements) Act 2012	No. 40 of 2012	
Local Government (Brimbank City Council) Amendment Act 2012	No. 41 of 2012	
State Taxation Acts Amendment Act 2012	No. 42 of 2012	
Statute Law Revision Act 2012 (repealed)	No. 43 of 2012	27 June 2012
An Act to revise the statute law of Victoria. (Repealed by Statute Law Revision Act 2012 (No. 43 of 2012))
Wills Amendment (International Wills) Act 2012	No. 44 of 2012	
Road Safety and Sentencing Acts Amendment Act 2012	No. 45 of 2012	
Forests Amendment Act 2012	No. 46 of 2012	
Residential Tenancies Amendment Act 2012	No. 47 of 2012	
Criminal Procedure Amendment Act 2012	No. 48 of 2012	
Criminal Procedure and Sentencing Acts Amendment (Victims of Crime) Act 2012	No. 49 of 2012	
Road Safety Amendment Act 2012	No. 50 of 2012	
Energy Legislation Amendment Act 2012	No. 51 of 2012	
Evidence Amendment (Journalist Privilege) Act 2012	No. 52 of 2012	
Planning and Environment Amendment (VicSmart Planning Assessment) Act 2012	No. 53 of 2012	
Port Management Further Amendment Act 2012	No. 54 of 2012	
Racing Legislation Amendment Act 2012	No. 55 of 2012	
Residential Tenancies and Other Consumer Acts Amendment Act 2012	No. 56 of 2012	
Drugs, Poisons and Controlled Substances Amendment Act 2012	No. 57 of 2012	
Fire Services Property Levy Act 2012 or the Emergency Services and Volunteers Fund Act 2012	No. 58 of 2012	16 October 2012
An Act to impose a fire services property levy on all land in Victoria unless specifically exempted, to provide for collection agencies to collect the fire services property levy, to provide for the Commissioner of State Revenue to receive the fire services property levy and pay it into the Consolidated Fund, to make consequential amendments to the Country Fire Authority Act 1958, (Note: Country Fire Authority Act 1958 (No. 6228)) the Essential Services Commission Act 2001, (Note: Essential Services Commission Act 2001 (No. 62 of 2001)) the Metropolitan Fire Brigades Act 1958, (Note: Metropolitan Fire Brigades Act 1958 (No. 6315)) the Valuation of Land Act 1960 (Note: Valuation of Land Act 1960 (No. 6653)) and the Victorian Managed Insurance Authority Act 1996 (Note: Victorian Managed Insurance Authority Act 1996 (No. 11 of 1996)) and for other purposes.
Community Based Sentences (Transfer) Act 2012	No. 59 of 2012	
Primary Industries and Food Legislation Amendment Act 2012	No. 60 of 2012	
Working with Children Amendment Act 2012	No. 61 of 2012	
Civil Procedure Amendment Act 2012	No. 62 of 2012	
Local Government Legislation Amendment (Miscellaneous) Act 2012	No. 63 of 2012	
Resources Legislation Amendment (General) Act 2012	No. 64 of 2012	
Serious Sex Offenders (Detention and Supervision) Amendment Act 2012	No. 65 of 2012	
Transport Legislation Amendment (Marine Drug and Alcohol Standards Modernisation and Other Matters) Act 2012	No. 66 of 2012	
Free Presbyterian Church Property Amendment Act 2012	No. 67 of 2012	
Justice Legislation Amendment (Miscellaneous) Act 2012	No. 68 of 2012	
Retail Leases Amendment Act 2012	No. 69 of 2012	
Road Management Amendment (Peninsula Link) Act 2012	No. 70 of 2012	
Tobacco Amendment (Smoking at Patrolled Beaches) Act 2012	No. 71 of 2012	
Classification (Publications, Films and Computer Games) (Enforcement) Amendment Act 2012	No. 72 of 2012	
Education Legislation Amendment (Governance) Act 2012	No. 73 of 2012	
Offshore Petroleum and Greenhouse Gas Storage Amendment (NOPSEMA) Act 2012	No. 74 of 2012	
Road Safety Amendment (Operator Onus) Act 2012	No. 75 of 2012	
State Taxation and Other Acts Amendment Act 2012	No. 76 of 2012	
Police Regulation Amendment Act 2012	No. 77 of 2012	
Climate Change and Environment Protection Amendment Act 2012	No. 78 of 2012	
Commission for Children and Young People Act 2012	No. 79 of 2012	18 December 2012
An Act to establish the Commission for Children and Young People and for other purposes.
Criminal Organisations Control Act 2012	No. 80 of 2012	18 December 2012
An Act to provide for the making of declarations and control orders for the purpose of preventing and disrupting the activities of organisations involved in serious criminal activity, and of their members, former members, prospective members and associates, to provide for the recognition and application of declarations and control orders made under corresponding laws and to make related amendments to other Acts and for other purposes.
Fire Services Levy Monitor Act 2012	No. 81 of 2012	18 December 2012
Integrity and Accountability Legislation Amendment Act 2012	No. 82 of 2012	18 December 2012
Justice Legislation Amendment (Family Violence and Other Matters) Act 2012	No. 83 of 2012	18 December 2012
Mineral Resources (Sustainable Development) Amendment Act 2012	No. 84 of 2012	18 December 2012
Protected Disclosure Act 2012 or the Public Interest Disclosures Act 2012	No. 85 of 2012	18 December 2012
An Act to encourage and facilitate disclosures of improper conduct by public officers, public bodies and other persons or of detrimental action taken in reprisal for a disclosure, to provide protection for persons who make those disclosures and to provide for the confidentiality of the content of those disclosures and the identity of persons who make those disclosures, to make related amendments to other Acts, to repeal the Whistleblowers Protection Act 2001 (Note: Whistleblowers Protection Act 2001 (No. 36 of 2001)) and for other purposes.
Tobacco Amendment (Shopper Loyalty Schemes) Act 2012	No. 86 of 2012	18 December 2012
An Act to amend the Tobacco Act 1987 (Note: Tobacco Act 1987 (No. 81 of 1987)) to limit further the operation of shopper loyalty schemes in relation to the sale of tobacco products and for other purposes.

== Sources ==
- "Acts as made: 2012". Victoria Legislation.
