= Australian Parkour Association =

- Founded: 2006
- Legal status: Incorporated association
- Members: 109 (2013)
- President: Liam Richer
- Website: www.parkour.asn.au

The Australian Parkour Association (APA) is an incorporated association concerned with the promotion and teaching of parkour throughout Australia. At present, the APA has over 100 active members, while many times that number have attended or regularly attend APA-run parkour classes.

The Australian Parkour Association became a founding member of Parkour Earth, an international federation of National parkour bodies founded by Poland, France, United Kingdom, New Zealand and France in July 2017.

== Purpose ==
The core purpose of the APA is to nurture the development of parkour in Australia. It seeks to achieve this in a number of ways, including: teaching parkour through the provision of classes and workshops, acting as a representative body for those who practice parkour, and advancing positive portrayals of parkour in the media.

== Formation and origins ==
On 21 June 2006, the Australian Parkour Association (APA) became a registered incorporation under Australian law, as a nonprofit organization. This action was instigated by a group of Melbourne traceurs, who found themselves 'teaching' newcomers as parkour started to grow in popularity, and were thus seen as responsible for their 'students'. An incident in 2005 which involved a threat of legal action against several members of the Melbourne parkour community left an indelible impression upon those involved, even after events were clarified and the threat of legal action faded.

The APA now provides members and instructors with "protection of the members and office holders against personal liability for debts and other legal obligations of the organisation."

Another reason for the formation of the APA was to establish a nationally recognised body to promote a positive and accurate portrayal of parkour in Australia. Globally, there has been significant controversy regarding the philosophical underpinnings of parkour, with many feeling that important principles were being left out of mainstream media representation. The founders of the APA felt and continue to feel a strong adherence to the non-competitive and altruistic principles laid down by parkour founder David Belle.

Following discussions initially localised in Melbourne, similar groups in Sydney and Canberra were contacted and quickly included, their contributions refining and completing the concept of what is now known as the APA.

== Teaching ==
In line with the core purpose of the APA, there are now weekly classes available to the general public in several major cities across Australia. At present the APA runs classes in Melbourne, Sydney, Canberra, Perth, Brisbane, and Adelaide. Most of these classes are run by instructors and assistant instructors volunteering their time. In addition to weekly classes, the APA has also been involved in organising workshops for disadvantaged and at-risk youths.

== The APA and the media ==
Many APA members have featured in media appearances in recent years, with the aim of positively and accurately representing parkour to the wider community. In September 2007, members were involved in a high-profile piece for 60 Minutes, which was broadcast nationally during Sunday prime time on Channel 9. Following the 60 Minutes piece, class numbers increased dramatically. In addition to this involvement, the APA has contributed to numerous newspaper, radio and local television features.
