= Administrative guidance =

Administrative guidance is non-binding advice given by an administrative agency to the public regarding how best to comply with a particular law or regulation. It may also be referred to by terms such as "advice" or "recommendation." Guidance is often used to explain the objective or interpretation of a vague or nonspecific law or requirement.

== Types of guidance documents ==
While guidance documents are not usually enforceable rules or requirements by themselves, they often define standards or expectations which are part of a rule or requirement. For example, a regulation might require adequate testing for relevant microorganisms in sterile containers and a guidance document would be used to explain what testing is adequate and which organisms are relevant.

Guidance documents are also used to explain internal policies or practices to simplify an organization's interactions with other parties. For example, a guidance document could explain how to prepare a report or what information should be gathered before submitting a complaint.

== Japan ==
Administrative guidance (行政指導, gyōsei shidō) is a Japanese government practice defined under Article 2 of the Administrative Procedure Act of 1993 as "guidance, recommendations, advice, or other acts by which an Administrative Organ may seek, within the scope of its duties or affairs under its jurisdiction, certain action or inaction on the part of specified persons in order to realize administrative aims, where such acts are not Dispositions."

Historically, the government of Japan employed this practice in imposing its policies on individuals and organizations, implying poorer treatment for those who failed to comply with its non-binding advice.

The Act of 1993 was the first statute to specifically regulate the practice of administrative guidance. Under the Act:

- A government agency may not treat a person in an adverse manner solely because that person failed to follow administrative guidance (article 32.2).
- Administrative guidance may not be used to pressure a petitioner into withdrawing or modifying a petition once they have indicated an intent not to do so (article 33).
- The content of administrative guidance and the identity of the official responsible must be made clear to the counterparty (article 35.1).
- Verbal administrative guidance must be followed by a summary in writing if the counterparty demands it (article 35.2).

== United States ==
In United States law, although administrative guidance is not generally binding on the public as a whole, it may serve as persuasive authority regarding the correct interpretation of the law. Additionally, if guidance has been voluntarily sought by a member of the public, it may be binding on the person who sought it.

=== Good guidance practice ===
In the United States, guidance documents published by federal agencies are required to follow a set of requirements to ensure that the documents they publish are useful and accurate. These rules are referred to as "good guidance practice" (GGP) and require specific controls. For example, agencies have to ask for public comment before publishing major guidance documents, similar to the requirements for new rules and regulations.

== See also ==
- Private letter ruling
- White paper
