= Australian Postgraduate Awards =

Postgraduate research scholarship to 2017

The Australian Postgraduate Awards (APA) was a scholarship program, founded by the Australian Federal Government, designed to support postgraduate research training, which was awarded to students of "exceptional research potential". The allocation each tertiary institution received was based in part on its overall research performance.

The grant of the award was very competitive and based on the student achieving a minimum of first class honours or equivalent.

In 2013 a full-time APA recipient received a stipend of A$24,653, and a part-time student A$12,326. The scholarship was tax-free, and indexed annually. The stipend was provided for two years for a masters student, and three years for a PhD student, with a possibility of a six-month extension.

From 1 January 2017, the Australian Postgraduate Award (APA) ceased and, along with the International Postgraduate Research Scholarship (IPRS), and the Research Training Scheme (RTS), was replaced by the Research Training Program (RTP). The Australian Government funded scholarships for domestic and international students undertaking research doctorate and research master's degrees at eligible Australian universities through the RTP.

All APA students transitioned to RTP scholarships from 1 January 2017.
