= Amplified piezoelectric actuator =

Amplified piezoelectric actuators are specific actuators using piezoelectric materials as active material and have a specific design to overcome traditional limitations of classical direct piezoelectric actuators, the limited stroke. As classical piezoelectric materials have a strain of 0.1%, it is practically impossible to reach significant stroke without displacement amplification (1 mm displacement would require 1 meter of piezoelectric material). The solution to reach middle range stroke is to use an amplification system.

== Single-cell actuator ==
The principle is based on the deformation of an elliptic shell to amplify the ceramic strain. The ceramic stack is aligned with the great axis of the ellipse. A small deformation of the great axis creates a large displacement of the small axis. The amplification ratio can typically reach 20 times, that means such actuators can reach strokes of 1 mm.

The goal of the elliptic shell is not only to amplify the displacement. It has also to apply the correct pre-stress to the piezoelectric material in order to allow dynamic and precise motion. The other advantage is that this kind of flextentional actuator is very reliable.

Displacement amplification can also be accomplished by using rigid struts connected by flexure bearings. This separation allows inverted geometries, allowing either contraction or expansion of the output even if the dominant motion of the piezo is expansion. Actuators of this type can have a stroke of 2 mm.

== Multi-cell actuator ==
In diamond shaped amplifiers, using 4 piezo crystals instead of one increases control of movement, particularly in changing temperatures. More movers result in more force at similar displacement.

== Lever arm amplification ==
Another method of amplifying the piezo stroke is to use a lever arm, which can be a primary or a secondary amplification mechanism, and can be used to generate displacements with 10 to 40 times magnification. The lever arm amplification method were used as amplified piezoelectric actuator in 1980s as a piezoelectric impact printer element by T.Yano et al. from EM Precicison Technologies Ltd.(later renamed Mechano Transformer Corporation). Later, the company introduced another kind of secondary amplification mechanism by using the lever arm and spring leaf. With this combination, the amplification ratio can achieve more than 10 times.

== Applications ==
Piezoelectric actuators, and especially amplified piezoelectric actuators, have been historically studied and used in aerospace applications. NASA, for example, studied and tested its own actuators for cryogenic applications. Other organizations like ESA or ISRO are also studying such solutions. The space industry's interest in amplified piezoelectric actuators is due to the high power density of these actuators, high positioning accuracy, high reliability, and low power losses when used in quasistatic operation.

Amplified piezoelectric actuators have no sliding parts due to the flexural hinges and do not require lubrication. Lubrication-free performance is important for cryogenics, where traditional lubricants may freeze, and for vacuum applications, where lubricants could outgas or trap atmospheric gasses.

Piezoelectric actuators can also be made with nonmagnetic materials, which allows their use in MRI machine.

Controlling helicopter rotor blades using active flaps has been investigated for some time without being put into production. The most commonly used technology is the amplified piezoelectric actuator.
