= Administrative Procedure Act (Japan) =

The Administrative Procedure Act (Japanese: 行政手続法, Hepburn: Gyōsei tetsuzuki-hō), enacted in 1993, governs general functions of government agencies in Japan.

== Chapters ==
1. General Provisions
2. Dispositions Upon Applications: Requires administrative agencies to implement concrete standards of review and indicate processing times for applications.
3. Adverse Dispositions: Establishes procedures and evidentiary standards for hearings and rulings.
4. Administrative Guidance: Establishes regulations for non-dispositive advice conducted by the government.
5. Notifications
6. Public Comment Procedure, Etc.

== Exclusions ==
A number of government activities are excluded from the Act. These include:

- Diet, judicial and prosecutorial activities
- Law enforcement
- Tax and securities regulation
- Prisons
- Schools
- Immigration control
