= American Polygraph Association =

Professional association

The American Polygraph Association (APA) is a professional association of polygraph examiners. It was established in 1966. It has about 2,800 members.

The organization offers its members publications and conferences related to polygraphy, as well as employment services and public referrals for its members. It lobbies to promote its members' interests at the local, state, and federal levels. It also establishes minimum standards for the education and training of polygraphers, and offers accreditation to programs that meet those standards. The association does not accredit or certify individuals.

The stated goals of the APA are:

- Serving the cause of truth with integrity, objectivity and fairness to all persons
- Encouraging and supporting research, training and education to benefit members of the Association as well as those who support its purpose and by providing a forum for the presentation and exchange of information derived from such research, training and education
- Establishing and enforcing standards for admission to membership and continued membership in the Association
- Governing the conduct of members of the Association by requiring adherence to a Code of Ethics and a set of Standards and Principles of Practice

APA members are proponents of the control question technique of polygraph admission, which includes asking questions designed to gain a greater physiological response from innocent subjects being given a polygraph.

About 10 years before the founding of the APA, a future president of the organization, Chris Gugas, demonstrated the polygraph before a national television audience with Groucho Marx on the comedian's show You Bet Your Life.
