= Advance pricing agreement =

An advance pricing agreement (APA) is an ahead-of-time agreement between a taxpayer and a tax authority on an appropriate transfer pricing methodology (TPM) for a set of transactions at issue over a fixed period of time (called "Covered Transactions").

Most APAs involve U.S. taxpayers and the US Internal Revenue Service (IRS), but APAs are also made outside the United States.

Bilateral and multilateral APAs
APAs are generally bi- or multilateral—i.e. they also include agreements between the taxpayer and one or more foreign tax administrations under the authority of the mutual agreement procedure (MAP) specified in income tax treaties. The taxpayer benefits from such agreements since they are assured that income associated with covered transactions is not subject to double taxation by the IRS and the relevant foreign tax authorities. It is IRS policy to "encourage" taxpayers to seek bilateral or multilateral APAs where competent-authority provisions exist.

Unilateral APAs
It is possible, however, that a taxpayer may negotiate a unilateral APA involving only the taxpayer and the IRS. In this case, the two parties negotiate an appropriate TPM for U.S. tax purposes only. Should the taxpayer be involved in a dispute with a foreign tax administration regarding the covered transactions, they may seek relief by requesting that the U.S. competent authority initiate a mutual agreement proceeding. This assumes, of course, that there is an applicable income tax treaty in force with the foreign country.

The APA Program
Each APA is handled by an APA team. One of the APA Program's designated team leaders is responsible for assembling the team, and it will generally consist of an economist, an international examiner, a LMSB field counsel, and—in bi- or multilateral cases—a U.S. competent-authority analyst tasked with leading discussions with treaty partners. Other team members may include an LMSB International Technical Advisor, LMSB exam personnel, or an Appeals Officer.
