= APA – The Engineered Wood Association =

- Company type: Nonprofit
- Industry: Engineered Wood
- Founded: 1933; 93 years ago Tacoma, Washington, United States
- Headquarters: Tacoma, Washington, United States
- Area served: U.S. and Canadian engineered wood products industry
- Key people: Mark Tibbetts (President); Tara Mattina (Director of Market Communications); Borjen Yeh (Director of Technical Services); Charles Barnes (Director of International Marketing)
- Products: Intellectual property
- Revenue: ▲US$16.11 million (2017)
- Number of employees: 51 to 200 (2018)
- Website: apawood.org

APA – The Engineered Wood Association is a nonprofit trade association of the United States and Canadian engineered wood products industry. They represent engineered wood manufacturers and mandate things such as quality testing, product research, and market development. APA's corporate headquarters are in Tacoma, Washington. The headquarters campus includes an office building and a 42,000-square-foot Research Center. A regional quality testing laboratory is located in Atlanta, Georgia.

== History ==
APA – The Engineered Wood Association is the nonprofit trade association of the U.S. and Canadian engineered wood products industry. Based in Tacoma, Washington, the Association is composed of and represents manufacturers of structural plywood, oriented strand board (OSB), cross-laminated timber, glued laminated (glulam) timber, wood I-joists, laminated veneer lumber (LVL) and other structural composite lumber (SCL) products.

APA was founded in 1933 as the Douglas Fir Plywood Association (DFPA) to advance the interests of the burgeoning Pacific Northwest plywood industry. Adhesive and technology improvements eventually led to the manufacture of structural plywood from Southern pine and other species, and in 1964 the Association changed its name to American Plywood Association (APA) to reflect the national scope of its growing membership.

The Association's membership expanded again in the early 1980s with the introduction of oriented strand board (OSB), a product the Association helped bring to market through development of new panel performance standards. A decade later, APA accommodated manufacturers of non-panel engineered wood products, such as glulam timber, wood I-joists and laminated veneer lumber.

To better reflect the broadening product mix and geographic range of its membership, the Association changed its name again in 1994 to APA – The Engineered Wood Association. The acronym “APA” was retained in the name because it was so widely known and respected in the marketplace.
