= Apa (footballer) =

Spanish footballer

Personal information
- Full name: Javier Aparicio Gómez
- Date of birth: 8 March 2000 (age 26)
- Place of birth: Palencia, Spain
- Height: 1.80 m (5 ft 11 in)
- Position: Right back

Team information
- Current team: Valladolid B
- Number: 2

Youth career
- CIA
- 2015–2017: Valladolid

Senior career*
Years	Team	Apps	(Gls)
2017–	Valladolid B	57	(1)
2018–	Valladolid	0	(0)
- * Club domestic league appearances and goals as of 8 March 2020

Javier Aparicio Gómez (born 8 March 2000), commonly known as Apa, is a Spanish professional footballer who plays for Real Valladolid B as a right back.

== Club career ==
Born in Palencia, Castile and León, Apa joined Real Valladolid's youth setup in 2015, from Club Internacional de la Amistad. On 7 May 2017, aged just 17, he made his senior debut with the reserves by coming on as a half-time substitute in a 1–4 home loss against Cultural y Deportiva Leonesa in the Segunda División B championship.

On 13 April 2018, after becoming a regular starter for the B-side, Apa extended his contract until 2020. He made his first team debut on 6 December 2018, starting in a 2–1 home win against RCD Mallorca, for the season's Copa del Rey.
