= Association of Publishing Agencies =

- Abbreviation: APA
- Type: Not-for-profit trade body
- Headquarters: London, UK
- CEO: Patrick Fuller
- COO: Julia Hutchison

The Association of Publishing Agencies (APA) is a not-for-profit trade body that promotes the interests of companies involved in the production customer publishing.

== Structure ==
The APA is based in London, UK and is run by Patrick Fuller, CEO, and Julia Hutchison, COO. It is situated just east of Kingsway (A4200) in Lincoln's Inn Fields, Holborn in the London Borough of Camden.

== Customer publishing ==
Customer publishing, also known as ‘contract publishing’, refers to publications, websites or digital work produced by agencies on behalf of clients who are brand owners, including companies from sectors as far ranging as automotive, retail, and financial services to charity, public sector and travel and leisure. Customer publications and digital work have been shown to boost brand recognition and loyalty, in addition to helping sales uplift.

The two sectors which account for the biggest share in customer publishing are retailers and financial services, with almost 30 per cent of the market combined. The customer publishing market was estimated to be worth £904 million in 2008 and is projected to reach £1 billion in 2011.

== The Digital Audit ==
In 2007, the APA commissioned the APA Digital Audit to provides an in-depth measurement of the role of digital within the customer publishing industry. An independent digital research agency conducted a digital audit of all members assessing their online credentials. The audit results showed an increasing appetite for digital content from customer publishers.

== See also ==
- Content marketing
- Custom media
