= Antarctic Protected Area =

An Antarctic Protected Area is an area protected under the Antarctic Treaty System. There are three types of Protected Areas under this system:

- Antarctic Specially Protected Area (ASPA) under the Agreed Measures for the Conservation of Antarctic Fauna and Flora (1964 onwards) and Annex V to the Environment Protocol (2002)
- Antarctic Specially Managed Area (ASMA) under Annex V of the Environment Protocol (2002)
- Historic Site or Monument (HSM)

Guidelines for scientists and other visitors have been developed to protect these areas.
