= Japan Advertising Photographers' Association =

Japanese photography organization

- 日本広告写真家協会
- Abbreviation: APA
- Formation: 1958
- Founded at: Japan
- Type: Professional association
- Legal status: Active
- Purpose: To promote and support advertising photography in Japan
- Professional title: Photographer
- Location: Japan
- Region served: Japan
- Fields: Advertising photography
- Official language: Japanese
- Publication: Annual survey of photography

The Japan Advertising Photographers' Association (日本広告写真家協会, Nihon Kōkoku-Shashinka Kyōkai), commonly called APA, was founded in 1958. It has held exhibitions since 1959 and publishes an annual survey of the most interesting photography.

== Links and sources ==
- (in Japanese) APA-Japan.com
- (in Japanese) Nihon shashinka jiten (日本写真家事典) / 328 Outstanding Japanese Photographers). Kyoto: Tankōsha, 2000. ISBN 4-473-01750-8
