= Administrative Procedure Act (Switzerland) =

Swiss law governing Swiss federal administrative procedures

Administrative Procedure Act (APA)
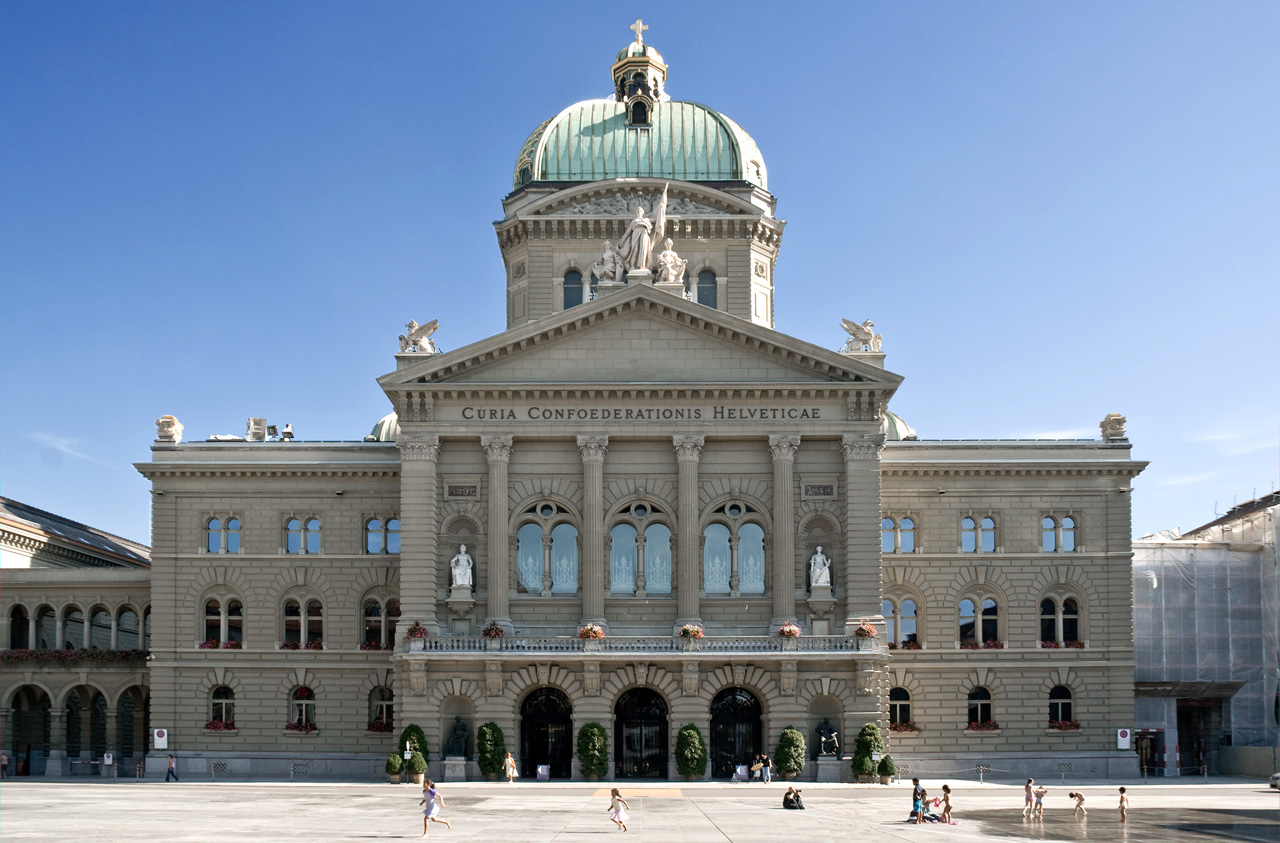

Federal Assembly of Switzerland
- Long title: Federal Act on Administrative Procedure (SR 172.021)
- Territorial extent: Switzerland
- Enacted by: Federal Assembly of Switzerland
- Enacted: 20 December 1968
- Commenced: 1 October 1969
- Status: Current legislation

The Administrative Procedure Act (APA) (Note: German: Verwaltungsverfahrensgesetz, VwVG; French: Loi fédérale sur la procédure administrative, PA; Italian: Legge federale sulla procedura amministrativa, PA.) is a Swiss federal law that regulates the procedures followed by Swiss federal administrative authorities when making decisions that affect the rights of individuals. It was adopted on 20 December 1968 by the Federal Assembly and came into force on 1 October 1969.

The main purpose of the APA is to ensure that administrative procedures are conducted in a fair and transparent manner. This is achieved by establishing clear rules for decision-making, including the right to be heard, the right to access files, and the right to appeal decisions.

Prior to the introduction of the law, the regulation on administrative procedures was fragmented, with many gaps in written law, especially with regard to non-contentious proceedings.

== Key provisions ==
Its provisions apply to all administrative authorities, including the Federal Council, the Federal Chancellery, the Federal Assembly, the Federal Administrative Court, departments and offices subordinate to them, and other organisations outside the Federal Administration that issue rulings in fulfilment of the federal public law duties assigned to them.

The APA sets out a number of principles that guide administrative decision-making. These include the principle of legality, which requires authorities to act in accordance with the law, as well as the principles of proportionality, equality, and impartiality. The law also establishes the duty of authorities to provide reasons for their decisions and to ensure that they are properly motivated.

One of the key features of the APA is the right of individuals to be heard before a decision is made that affects their rights. This includes the right to submit evidence and arguments, to request the examination of witnesses, and to have a hearing. The law also requires authorities to provide individuals with access to their files and to inform them of the legal remedies available to challenge decisions.

The APA also establishes a system of appeals for challenging administrative decisions. Individuals can appeal decisions to higher administrative authorities or to the courts. The law sets out the time limits for making appeals and the grounds on which they can be based.

In addition to regulating administrative procedures, the APA also establishes rules for the publication of administrative decisions and for the protection of personal data. The law requires authorities to publish their decisions in a manner that ensures their accessibility to the public, while also protecting the privacy of individuals.
