= Associations Incorporation Act 1981 (Queensland) =

Act of the Parliament of Queensland

Parliament of Queensland

The Associations Incorporation Act 1981 is an act of the Parliament of Queensland to regulate the affairs of incorporated associations.
