= Associations Incorporation Act 1981 (Victoria) =

Victorian legislation

Parliament of Victoria
- Long title: An Act to make provision for the Incorporation of certain Associations, for the Regulation of certain Affairs of Incorporated Associations, to amend the Evidence Act 1958 and for other purposes.
- Citation: No. 9713
- Royal assent: 5 January 1982

The Associations Incorporation Act 1981 (No. 9713) is the act of the Parliament of Victoria in Australia to make provision for the incorporation of certain associations, for the regulation of these incorporated associations.

It was assented to on 5 January 1982 and came into operation on 1 July 1983 after being printed in the Government Gazette on 25 May 1983 (p. 1238).

Among other changes, it amended the Evidence Act 1958. Consumer Affairs Victoria administers this legislation.

== Purpose ==
The aim of the act is to provide a way for the:

- registration and incorporation of associations
- regulation, accountability and governance of associations
