= Patricia Margaret Selkirk =

Australian plant biologist and ecologist

Patricia Margaret Selkirk AC AAM
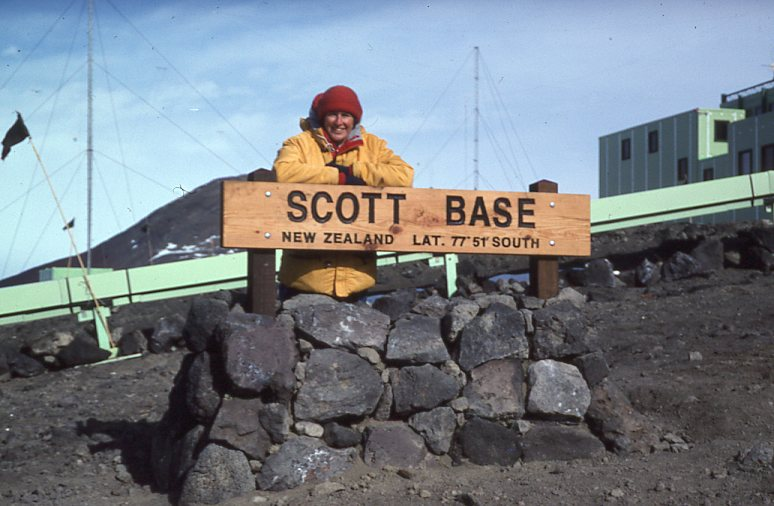
- Patricia Selkirk at Scott Base
- Born: Patricia Margaret Connell; 1942 (age 83–84); Newcastle, New South Wales, Australia
- Education: University of Sydney
- Spouse: Herbert Dartnall
- Children: 2
- Awards: Australian Antarctic Medal (2004)
- Scientific career
- Fields: Plant biology Ecology

Patricia Margaret Selkirk, AC AAM (née Connell; born 1942) is an Australian plant biologist and ecologist. Her career has focused on Antarctic and subantarctic terrestrial ecosystems and she is recognized as being a pioneering female Australian Antarctic scientist.

== Life and career ==
Patricia Margaret Connell was born in Newcastle, and educated at Narrabeen Girls' High School and The Women's College, The University of Sydney (BSc Hons, PhD). Her father, William Fraser (Bill) Connell (OBE) had been educated at the University of Melbourne, the University of London and the University of Illinois. He held the Chair in Education at the University of Sydney for many years focusing on educational research and teaching. Her mother Margaret Lloyd Peck, studied at the University of Melbourne and the Associated Teachers Training Institute, then taught secondary school maths and science. Selkirk has two younger sisters, Raewyn Connell and Helen Connell. She is married to Antarctic biologist, historian and author, Herbert Dartnall. She has two daughters.

Selkirk held positions at both Sydney and Macquarie Universities including teaching in the open university mode at Macquarie University.

Between 1979 and 2005, Selkirk took part in 18 field trips to the Antarctic and subantarctic islands with Australian, French and New Zealand national polar expeditions including Macquarie and Heard Islands, Iles Kerguelen, the Windmill Islands and the McMurdo Dry Valleys in Antarctica.

=== Research and publications ===
A plant biologist, Selkirk has published more than 80 papers on a wide range of Antarctic subjects including landscape-level geomorphology, vegetation history and palynology, and studies of plant reproduction and genetics, particularly in mosses. She is lead author, with R. D. Seppelt and the late D. R. Selkirk of the influential 1990 book, Subantarctic Macquarie Island: Environment and Biology. She was the first to recognise the importance of studying the impact of climate change on the subantarctic islands. Selkirk and colleagues established that Macquarie Island had not been significantly glaciated during the Last Glacial Maximum due to the island's low altitude. They also calculated uplift rates for the island, calculating that the island first appeared above the ocean some 700 to 600 thousand years ago. In Antarctica, working with Rod Seppelt, they were instrumental in recognising the importance of the moss beds (lush patches of mosses, growing on ancient abandoned penguin colonies) and establishing the area as a SSSI (Site of Special Scientific Interest), now Antarctic Specially Protected Area 135.

She continues her research with numerous Australian and international research colleagues, while her long term monitoring projects assume increasing significance with current climate change. Selkirk served on the Australian Antarctic Program's Antarctic Scientific Advisory Committee (1995–2001), and the Antarctic Research Evaluation Group (AREG) and the Australian Academy of Science's Australian National Committee for Antarctic Research (ANCAR).

== Trailblazing in Antarctica ==
Selkirk was one of the first women scientists to spend substantial time conducting field work on Macquarie Island. In 1959, the first women scientists (Isobel Bennett, Susan Ingham, Mary Gillham and Hope Macpherson) visited the island for a short period of time during the station's annual resupply and worked each day off the Nella Dan. Isobel Bennett visited for three more short times in 1960, 1965, 1965. In 1976, the first female medical practitioner (Zoe Gardner) spent a year on the island, followed by Jeannie Ledingham in 1977 and Lynn Williams in 1979. In 1979/80 scientists Selkirk and Jenny Scott (then a PhD student) spent five months working on the island. She was the postgraduate supervisor of Antarctic ecologist Dana Bergstrom.

Selkirk was also the first female scientist in the Australian Antarctic Program to spend a considerable time working at an Antarctic station. Prior to her first summer at Casey 1982/83, a single female medical practitioner (Louise Holliday) had spent the winter at Davis Station in 1981.

== Awards and honours ==
Selkirk was awarded the Australian Antarctic Medal in 2004 for her 'outstanding service' in support of Australian Antarctic expeditions', as a 'trail blazer, teacher, and inspirational role model for women scientists in Antarctica'. She is considered a pioneer of Australian Antarctic Science.

In 2017 the University of Sydney awarded Selkirk an Alumni Award for Professional Achievement.

The Australian Antarctic Gazetteer includes Selkirk Creek, a Macquarie Island stream named after Patricia Selkirk, in honour of her scientific research on Macquarie Island.

In 2018 Selkirk was awarded the Phillip Law Medal for significant contributions to Antarctic science.

In June 2022, Selkirk was appointed Companion of the Order of Australia in the 2022 Queen's Birthday Honours for "eminent service to science and conservation, particularly through research of Antarctic and sub-Antarctic terrestrial ecosystems, to tertiary education, and as a mentor and champion for women".
