= Wienecke =

Wienecke is a surname. Notable people with the surname include:

- Barbara Wienecke, Namibian-born Australian scientist
- Henriette Wienecke (1819–1907), Norwegian-Danish composer
- Johannes Cornelis Wienecke (1872-1945), Dutch medallist
