= Mary Gillham =

British scientist (1921–2013)

Mary Gillham MBE
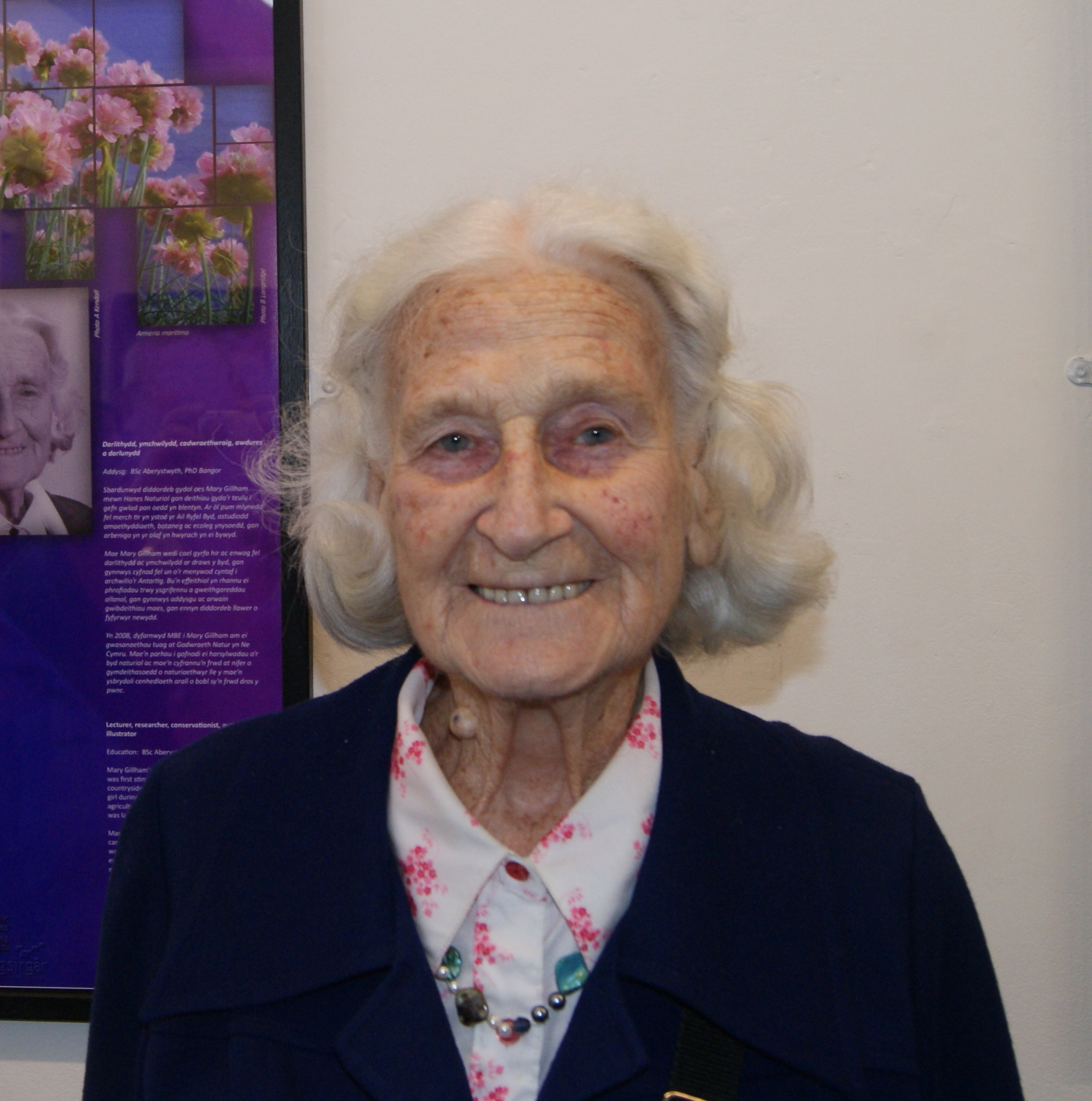
- Gillham was one of 13 botanists celebrated at the 'Inspirational Botanists – Women of Wales' exhibition in 2012.
- Born: Mary Eleanor Gillham; 26 November 1921; Ealing, London, England
- Died: 23 March 2013 (aged 91); Royal Glamorgan Hospital, Wales
- Education: University College of Wales, Aberystwyth (BSc); University of Wales, Bangor (PhD)
- Known for: Environmental activism and wildlife conservation
- Scientific career
- Fields: Botany
- Workplaces: University College of the South West of England; Massey University; University of Melbourne; University College, Cardiff
- Thesis: The Vegetation of the South Pembrokeshire Islands in relation to the environment (1953)
- Doctoral advisors: Lily Newton

President of the Cardiff Naturalists' Society
- In office 1974-95
- Preceded by: W. Glynn Hopkins
- Succeeded by: H. R. Loyn
- Website: www.marygillhamarchiveproject.com

Mary Eleanor Gillham MBE (26 November 1921 – 23 March 2013) was a British naturalist, university lecturer, and writer, who was resident for many years in Gwaelod y Garth and then Radyr, in Cardiff, Wales until her death.

Although born in a London suburb, and serving five wartime years in the Women's Land Army working on multiple farms, Mary Gillham spent much of her time in Wales. As a post-war student in the University of Wales at Aberystwyth and Bangor, she gained a degree in agriculture, a first-class honours in botany, and a PhD in island ecology. She lectured in the universities of Exeter (Devon), Massey (New Zealand), Melbourne (Australia), Kano (Nigeria), and worked in the Adult Education Department at University College, Cardiff from 1961 until her retirement in 1988.

As a teacher of adult amateur naturalists, she saw her role as an interpreter of scientific data for the layman, and took to writing books and popular articles. Spray-washed seabird colonies were her main love, and research on these took her to remote islands in many parts of the world, where she has lived in tents, huts, lighthouses, etc. Her major research projects were around the coasts of West Wales (her PhD thesis), Australia, New Zealand, and South Africa, and she was one of the first women scientists to join an Antarctic expedition (in 1959/60).

In 1970, she undertook a research project on Aldabra in the Indian Ocean, and subsequently took naturalists to the Seychelles. In 1979, she was visiting scientist on an American expedition (by sailing ship) to an uninhabited island in the Bahamas, and she took parties to Jamaica, New England, and the Rocky Mountains. Other expeditions were to North, West, East, and Central Africa, and Florida, and she led groups to various parts of Britain and Europe. Active in various natural history and conservation bodies over several decades, Gillham was president of the Glamorgan Naturalists' Trust and of the Cardiff Naturalists' Society.

In 2008, Gillham was awarded an MBE for services to nature conservation in South Wales.

== Early life and family ==
Gillham was born and brought up in Ealing, West London on 26 November 1921 to mother Edith Gertrude and father Charles Gillham, a secondary school teacher. The family resided at Birbeck Road in South Ealing and she attended Little Ealing Infants and Junior School. In 1927 the family moved to a newly built house at Gunnersbury Park (which later changed its name to Popes Lane), where she lived until her move to Wales in 1962. Gillham's elder brother, John, lived at this house until his death in March 2009.

During her childhood Gillham enjoyed going on camping trips with her brother and parents, going to places such as Scotland, the Lake District as well as places closer to home. It was unusual to go camping at the time therefore whilst on these trips Gillham had a passion for noting and sketching everything she saw. On the eve of World War II, the family even went on a camping trip to Switzerland.

Gillham left school at age 16 to start work in an office in Westminster. This was not her natural habitat therefore when war was declared in 1939 she happily signed up to the Women's Land Army where she served five years on various farms milking cows, helping the vet on his rounds and learning how to be a hands-on land girl.

== Education ==
Gillham attended Ealing County School for Girls, where she earned her Clerical Assistant's Grade I in April 1938, which would qualify her to later work at London County Council office in Westminster. She was also awarded a 2nd Class Award of the Royal Life-Saving Society in 1937.

When World War II ended in 1945, as a former member of the Women's Land Army, Gillham was eligible for a grant to go to university; something her family couldn't have afforded in peace-time. She became a post-war student at the University of Wales at Aberystwyth, gaining an undergraduate degree in Agriculture followed by a first-class honours in Botany in 1949. She was also involved in extracurricular activities at university, becoming captain of the gymnastics, folk dance, rowing and swim team.

At university Gillham fell in love with the coast and began a lifelong study of seabird islands, with research on Skomer and Skokholm. In 1953 she completed her PhD in Island Ecology at the University of Wales, Bangor, with her thesis researching the effects of seabirds on the vegetation of islands, based on research carried out on the islands off the Pembroke coast. Her PhD was supervised by Professor Lily Newton, to whom Gillham later dedicated her book 'Sub-Antarctic Sanctuary: Summertime on Macquarie Island'.

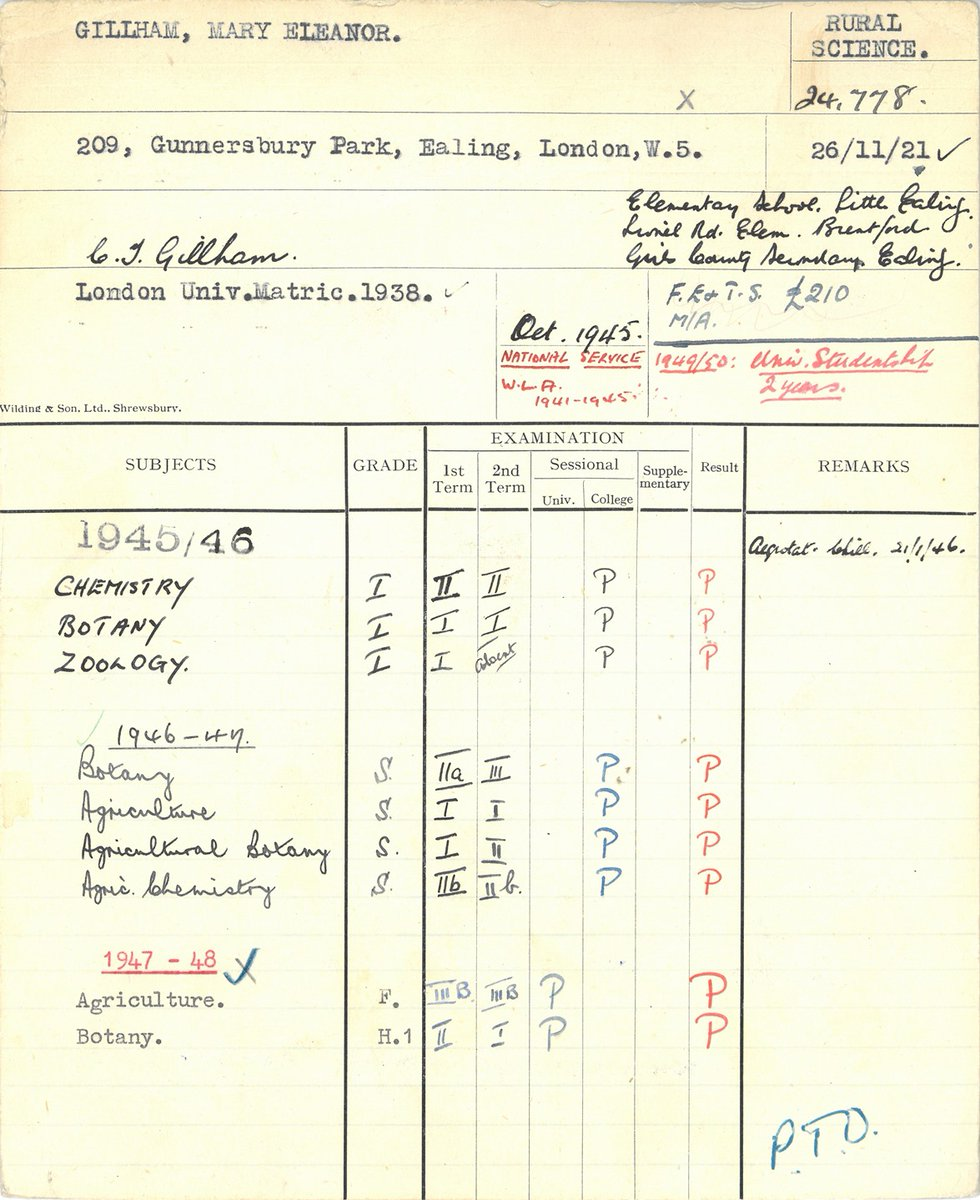
Gillham's school and undergraduate (Agriculture and Botany) results card

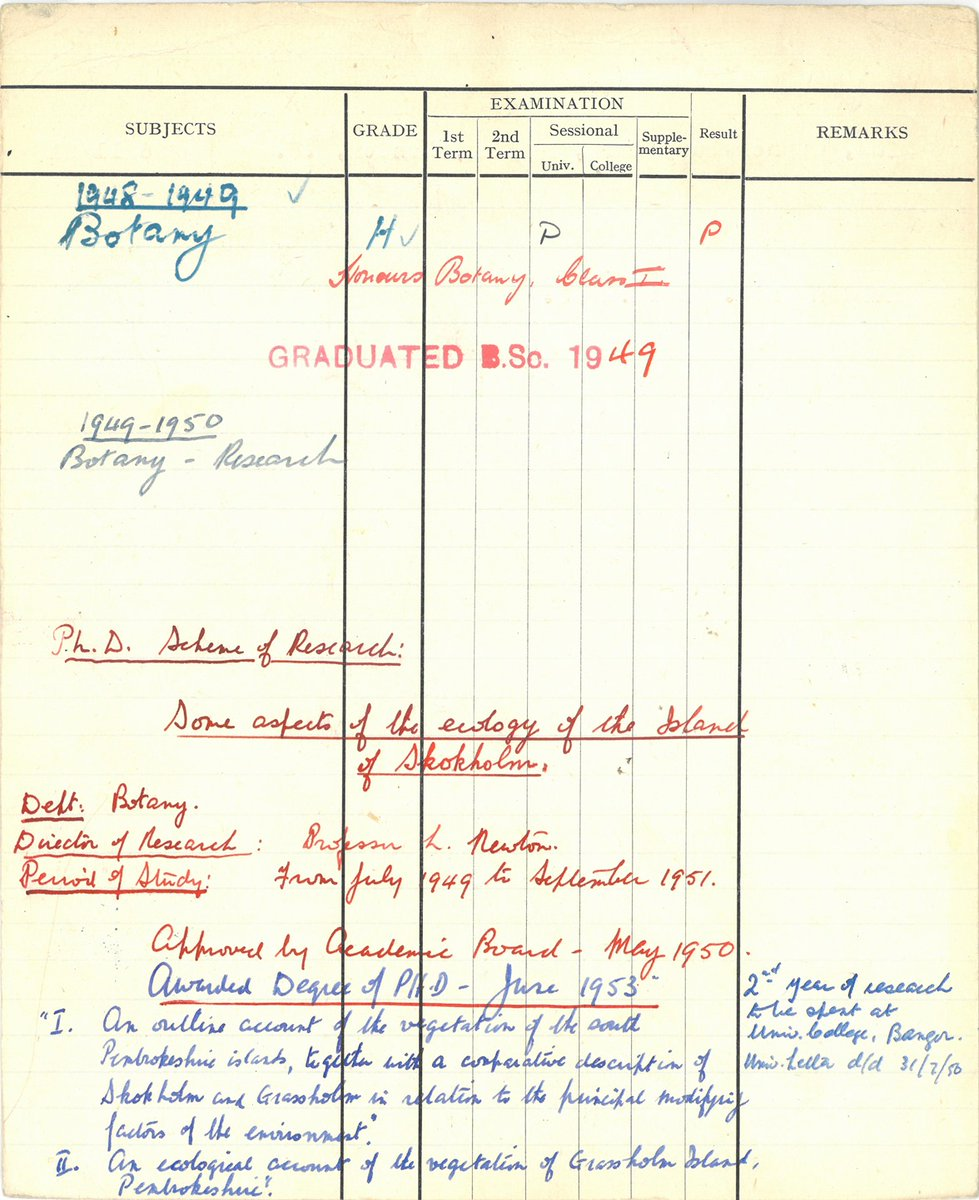
Gillham's exam results card for Botany Honours exams and PhD

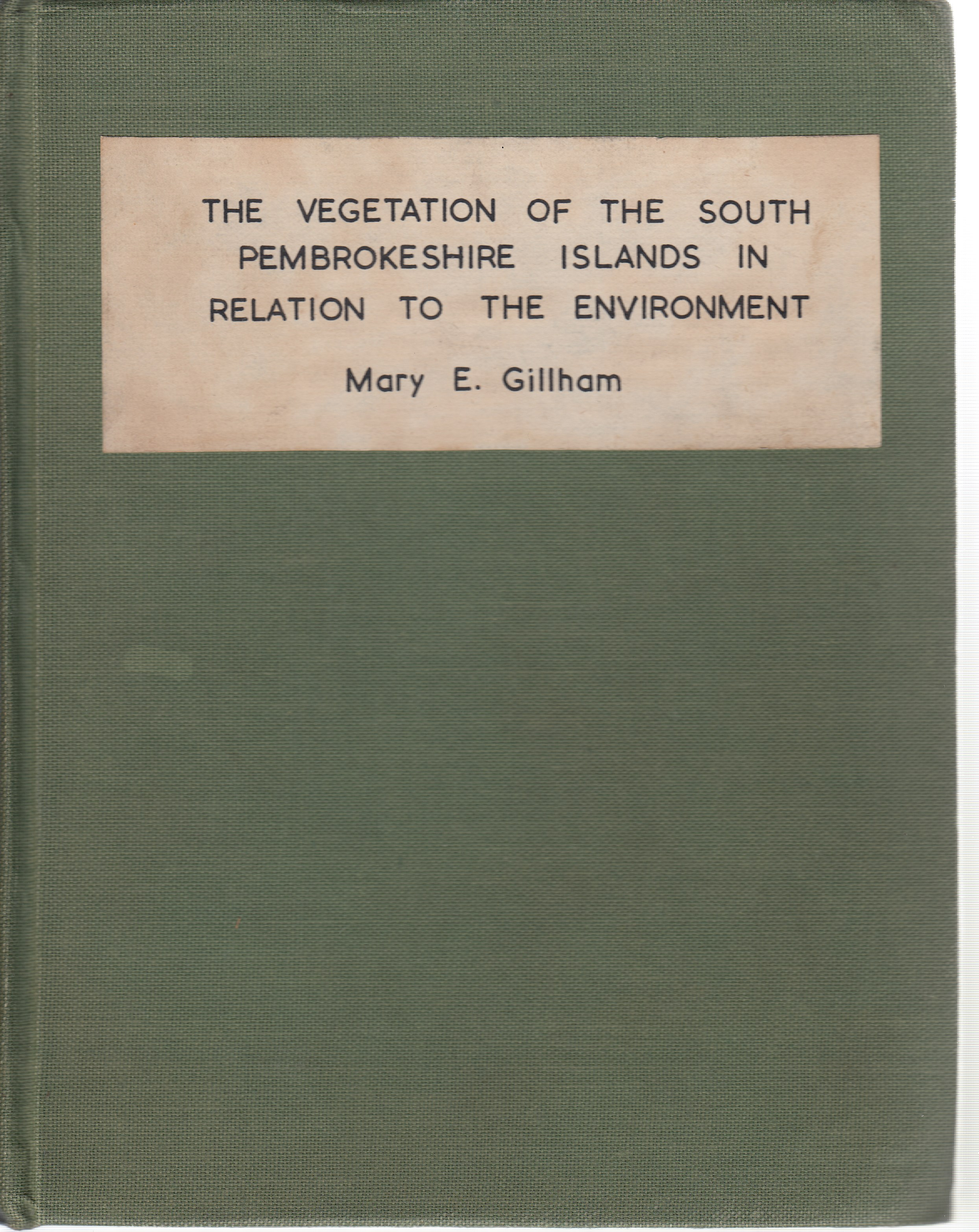
The cover of Mary Gillham's PhD thesis, 1953

== Academic career ==
In 1953, Gillham started lecturing in the Botany department of Exeter University, where she worked for three and a half years. On 1 March 1957, she began a one-year Botany exchange lectureship and wardenship at Massey University, in Palmerston North, New Zealand, where she moved into Moginie House. This position, along with small monetary grants from the British Council and from the University of New Zealand, kept her afloat financially whilst in New Zealand – where she could then undertake work on the commercial Muttonbird island of South-East Australia. Gillham then moved to work as a Senior Demonstrator at the Department of Botany at University of Melbourne, Australia on 3 March 1958 during an exchange lectureship.

From 1961 to 1988, she lectured at the Adult Education Department at the University of Wales, Cardiff, until her retirement in 1988.

In 1963, Gillham worked as a Staff Tutor in the Biological Sciences at University College of South Wales and Monmouthshire, Department of Extramural Studies. Here she lectured on numerous occasions for numerous courses, some examples including: a series of Travel Talks in 1963 (Tuesdays from 8–8.30 pm, for 11 weeks from 15 January to 9 April, and Fridays from 7-9pm), seven lectures on Coastal Vegetation in 1963, and 20 lectures in the course titled 'Environmental Studies in Natural History'; the latter being an annual course between 1970 and 1974. She gave her Extramural lectures in a range of locations in Wales, including: Cardiff, Merthyr Tydfil, Abergavenny, Risca, Llwynypia, Pontypridd, Gwaelod-y-Garth, St. Donats, Bargoed, Hay, Bridgend, Barry, Cowbridge, Porthcawl, Bassaleg, and Llantwit Major, mostly on topics of botany and natural history. Gillham also led numerous study tours for her students in locations closer to home: Guernsey (1969), the Shropshire Hills (1970), Monmouthshire (1970), Skomer Island (1978), Norfolk (1986), the Heritage Coast (1987), Gower (1987), Merthyr Mawr (1988), and Scilly Isles (1988), as well as further afield: Corfu (1969), Sardinia (1985) and Portugal (1986).

Gillham gave lectures about plants in relation to drought at Kano University in the southern Sahara region of Nigeria, in the mid-1980s; however, the university was closed while she was there due to outbreak of war. The majority of her students at the time were mature male students seeking to learn the key to getting plants to grow in the desert.

== International travel ==
=== New Zealand ===
Gillham left London by boat on 19 November 1956, arriving at New Zealand on 22 December 1956, after 33 1/2 days of sailing (stopping at Curaçao, Panama and Pitcairn on the way). She spent much of her time here studying New Zealand's natural history, especially the bird life. Whilst in the North Island she paid visits to Auckland, Palmerston North, Wellington, Napier and Cape Kidnappers; studying the Gannet colonies at the latter.

On 12 January 1957 she then moved to the South Island, visiting multiple locations including; Dunedin, Otago Peninsula to study Albatross colonies, Green Island, Southland, Fiordland, Stewart Island to look at the Muttonbird colonies, Muttonbird Island, Christchurch, Hokitika, Westland, Nelson and Picton.

Gillham moved to Massey, where she moved into Moginie House to begin her one-year Botany exchange lectureship and wardenship at Massey University on 27 February 1957.

She joined a one-week trip to Rotorua on 18 April 1957, and later headed to Wellington on 9 May 1957 where she spent time at the Animal Ecology section of the Department of Scientific and Industrial Research.

Later that year in August Gillham visited Auckland, from which she travelled around the Hauraki Gulf visiting Mokohinau, Little Barrier and Rangitoto Islands.

When back in Massey, she attended the New Zealand Ecological Society annual conference on 29 August 1957, where she discussed her research paper "Ecology of some New Zealand seabird colonies".

=== Australia ===
Gillham left Auckland by air for Sydney, Australia on 21 December 1957, also visiting Canberra and Corowa in the following days. She began an exchange lectureship working as a Senior Demonstrator at the Department of Botany at the University of Melbourne on 3 March 1958. Towards the end of that same month she left for a trip around the Bass Strait islands, visiting Flinders, Fisher, Great Dog, Little Dog, Woody and Isabella. She later visited these islands again in December 1958, with the addition of Tucks, West, East and South Spences, Little Green, Penguin Islet, Apple Orchard and Samphire.

On 25 April 1958 Gillham then set out for a visit to Phillip Island, to see and learn about the koalas on the Island and the little penguin colonies at Phillip Island Nature Park, or 'Penguin Parade'; visiting the Island again later that year in October to collect penguin guano for the Microbiology Department at the University of Melbourne.

Gillham joined a McCoy Society trip to Chinaman Island on 10 May 1958, in the north-west corner of Western Port, where she created lists of the Island's grazed and ungrazed plants. Later that month Gillham also holidayed at Albury, moving to Sydney, Kempsey and then to Brisbane. She then also paid visits to Lone Pine Koala Sanctuary, Lota, the Moreton Bay islands and Enoggera Reservoir.

She took a trip to Cape York, leaving Melbourne by boat a year later on 12 March 1959.

==== Tasmania ====
On 7 February 1959 Gillham left for a Tasmanian tour. She also spent the three summers of 1958–1960 at Tasmania investigating (as part of a team) the costs and benefits of pastoral farming and muttonbird harvesting, residing at a research hut on Fisher Island, in the Eastern Bass Strait between Tasmania and mainland Australia.

==== Macquarie Island ====
In December 1959 Mary Gillham, along with Susan Ingham (British), Hope Macpherson and Isobel Bennett (both Australian), became the first female scientists to join a research trip to Macquarie Island, Antarctica with ANARE (Australian National Antarctic Research Expedition). Leaving from Australia, the four women were present to support the ongoing study of aspects of animal and plant life on the island; with Mary's research analysing the effects of sea birds on the island's vegetation.

==== Western Australia ====
She made a four-day trip around the Jurien Bay islands (Favorite island, a satellite of Long island, Fisherman island and Cervantes island). On Fisherman Island on 1 December 1959, Gillham discovered a species of seal yet to be seen on the island; Once back in Melbourne, the discovery sparked debate between scientists at the Royal Society of Victoria symposium, with some insisting them to be fur seals and others believing them to be hair seals.

The success of these ground-breaking women during this trip paved the way for more female scientists to be able to join future expeditions such as this; had it not turned out so well, the involvement of female scientists on research trips would have been greatly delayed.

=== Africa ===
==== South Africa ====
Following her travels in Australia Gillham travelled to South Africa, arriving at Cape Town by boat on 1 May 1960. On 8 May 1960 she moved to Saldanha, from which she took an expedition to three of the Saldanha Bay Islands; Jutten, Malgas and Marcus. Gillham headed back to Cape Town on 13 May 1960, where she spent time at Compton Herbarium and visited Cape of Good Hope Nature Reserve.

On 24 May 1960 Gillham visited Robben Island, and a few days later she then left for a bird-watching trip at Lambert's Bay.

Gillham joined a two-day trip to Port Elizabeth on 1 June 1960, which she visited again later that month. She also took two trips to both Meeuw Island and Schaapen Island later in June that year.

She left Cape Town for Pretoria on 26 June 1960, stopping at Karoo, Parys and Johannesburg during the journey.

==== Central Africa ====
Gillham joined a day trip to Mozambique on 7 August 1960 where she visited the Susengenga (Little River Research Station); an agricultural research station, and the Barragem Oliveira Salazar dam. From here, she travelled to Sabi Valley, to Fort Victoria (now called Masvingo), back to Johannesburg and then reaching the Congo (after travelling through Angola) on 12 August 1960.

Between 27 January and 5 February 1994, Gillham spent time travelling around Zimbabwe, as well as spending a full day in Botswana, joining a sail along the River Chobe boundary of Namibia and also participating in a walk across Victoria Falls bridge to Zambia.

==== Nigeria ====
After Gillham's visit to Central Africa in August 1960, she travelled to Ghana on 12 August, but leaving on the following day (13 August) via Nigerian Airways to get to Lagos, Nigeria. On 14 August 1960 she arrived at Ibadan where she paid visits to tropical forests and the Olokemeji Forest Reserve. Later that month she also travelled to Minna, Nigeria from Jebba railway station to see the savannah zone. She also visited Kano in the same year, where she took a photograph of the Great Mosque of Kano.

=== Aldabra Island ===
In 1970 Gillham took a sabbatical to carry out research on Aldabra (CORR) in the Seychelles; far out in the Indian Ocean and virtually isolated from human activity. The US military wanted to turn the island into an airbase, therefore Gillham was to report information about the island's wildlife back to the Royal Society and the Smithsonian Institution before building could commence. Gillham reported the importance of the island for sea birds, including Frigatebirds, as well as for the Aldabra giant tortoise, so the island was never built upon. Today it is listed as a World Heritage Site.

== Achievements, awards and recognition ==
Active in several natural history and conservation bodies over many decades, Gillham was a founder member and subsequent president of Glamorgan Naturalists' Trust (now part of Wildlife Trust of South and West Wales) and was also president of the Cardiff Naturalists' Society.

In 2008, Gillham was awarded an MBE in the New Year's Honours list for services to nature conservation in South Wales.

On International Women's Day in 2012 she was one of thirteen women to be featured in an exhibition called "Inspirational Botanists – Women of Wales" at the National Botanic Garden of Wales; an exhibition celebrating the contribution of women to the field of Botanical Science in Wales for the past 200 years.

== Legacy ==
During her lifetime Gillham reached thousands of people during her lectures, guided walks and study tours, with whom she shared her botanical knowledge and interest in natural heritage. After her death she left behind a large amount of scientific data, including species lists and notes on conservation/land-use change, all hand written on paper.

=== Mary Gillham Archive Project ===
The Mary Gillham Archive Project (February 2016 – February 2018) was funded by the Heritage Lottery Fund and was aimed at promoting the life and work of Gillham, extracting the biodiversity records and historical memoir from her archive of written notes and physical documents, thereby capturing this information digitally. The project also engaged people with their local biodiversity and heritage through wildlife recording and outreach events, an exhibition, and through the creation of interactive online resource.

== Publications ==
=== Books ===
- 1963 – Sea-Birds. (Instructions to Young Ornithologists IV). Museum Press: London.
- 1966 – A Naturalist in New Zealand. Museum Press: London.
- 1967 – Sub-Antarctic Sanctuary: Summertime On Macquarie Island. Victor Gollancz: London.
- 1977 – The Natural History of Gower. D. Brown and Sons Ltd: Cowbridge.
- 1982 – The Historic Taf Valleys, Volume 2: In the Brecon Beacons National Park. Geology, Social History, Natural History. Merthyr Tydfil and District Naturalists' Society. (With John Perkins and Jack Evans). ISBN 0-905928-21-0
- 1982 – Swansea Bay's Green Mantle. Wildlife on an Industrial Coast. D. Brown & Sons: Cowbridge. ISBN 0-905928-18-0
- 1987 – Sand Dunes. Glamorgan Wildlife Trust: Bridgend.
- 1989 – Rivers. Glamorgan Heritage Coast Project, Southerndown. ISBN 0-9508538-2-8
- 1991 – Limestone Downs: Commons, Farms and Woods. Glamorgan Wildlife Trust: Bridgend.
- 1993 – Coastal Downs: Ogmore and Dunraven. Glamorgan Wildlife Trust: Bridgend. ISBN 0-9518015-1-1
- 1994 – Sea Cliffs Cwm Mawr to Gileston. Glamorgan Wildlife Trust: Bridgend.
- 1998 – Town Bred – Country Nurtured: A Naturalist Looks Back Fifty Years. ISBN 0-9534074-0-3
- 2000 – Island Hopping in Tasmania's Roaring Forties. A.H. Stockwell Ltd: Devon. ISBN 0-7223-3296-3
- 2000 – Islands of the Trade Winds: An Indian Ocean Odyssey. Minerva Press. ISBN 0-7541-0857-0
- 2001 – The Garth Countryside, Part of Cardiff's green mantle: A Natural History. Lazy Cat Publishing: Cardiff. ISBN 0-9537707-0-2
- 2002 – A Natural History of Cardiff: Exploring along the River Taff. Lazy Cat Publishing: Cardiff.
- 2004 – A Natural History of Cardiff: Exploring along the Rivers Rhymney and Roath. Dinefwr Publishers Ltd: Wales. ISBN 1-904323-11-1
- 2004 – Memories of Welsh Islands. Gwasg Dinefwr Press: Llandybie. ISBN 1-904323-08-1
- 2005 – Salt Wind from the Cape. Lazy Cat Publishing: Caerphilly.
- 2007 – A Naturalist on Lundy: The Island Wildlife Over 50 Years. Halsgrove: UK. ISBN 1-84114-589-0
- 2007 – Island Life. Discovering Britain's Offshore Gems. Halsgrove: UK. ISBN 1-84114-619-6
- 2009 – Wildlife watching in the slow lane : the nature diary of an octogenarian. Ryelands: Wellington, Somerset. ISBN 978-1-906551-18-6

=== Academic journal articles ===
Throughout her careers, Gillham published multiple peer-reviewed articles in the Journal of Ecology. Notable papers include:

- In vol 41, issue 1 (1953): An ecological account of the vegetation of Grassholm island, Pembrokeshire. pp. 84-99.
- In vol 42, issue 2 (1954): Ecology of the Pembrokeshire islands: II. Skokholm, environment and vegetation. The Journal of Ecology. pp. 296-327. (with Gordon Goodman)
- In vol 43, issue 1 (1955): Ecology of the Pembrokeshire islands: III. The effect of grazing on the vegetation. pp. 172-206.
- In vol 44, issue 1 (1956): Ecology of the Pembrokeshire islands: IV. Effects of treading and burrowing by birds and mammals. pp. 51-82.
- In vol 44, issue 2 (1956): Ecology of the Pembrokeshire islands: V. Manuring by the colonial Seabirds and mammals, with a note on seed distribution by Gulls. pp. 429-454.
- In vol 45, issue 3 (1957):
  - Vegetation of the Exe estuary in relation to water salinity. pp. 735-756.
  - Coastal vegetation of mull and Iona in relation to salinity and soil reaction. pp. 757-778.
- In vol 49, issue 2 (1961): Alteration of the breeding habitat by sea-birds and seals in western Australia. pp. 289-300.
- In vol 51, issue 2 (1963): Some interactions of plants, rabbits and sea-birds on South African islands. pp. 275-294.
