= Vansittart Island =

Island in Tasmania, Australia

Coordinates: 40°16′S 148°18′E

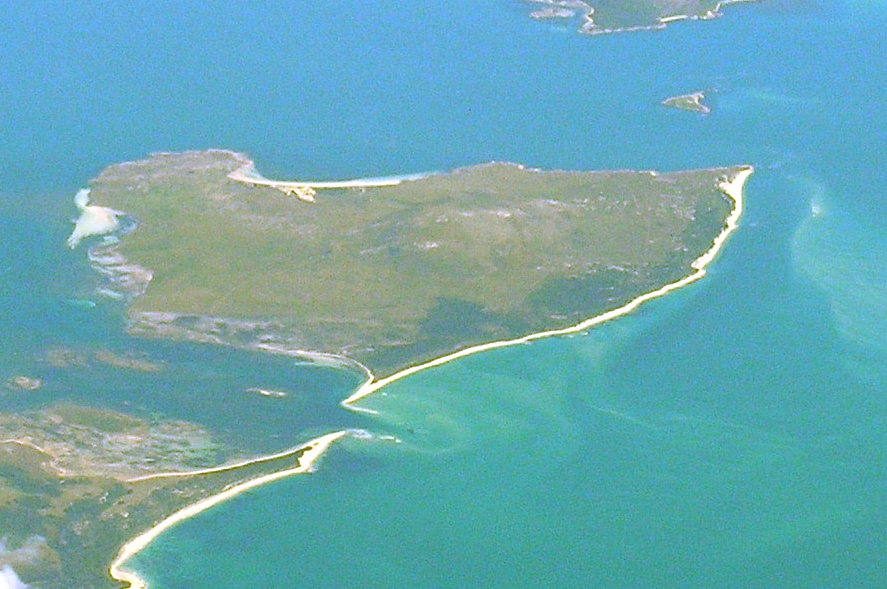
Aerial view of Vansittart Island

Vansittart Island, also known as Gun Carriage Island, is a granite island with an area of 800 hectares (2,000 acres). The island is part of Tasmania's Vansittart Island Group, lying in eastern Bass Strait between Flinders and Cape Barren Islands in the Furneaux Group.

Vansittart Island is a serene granite sanctuary surrounded by the waters of Bass Strait. It is a rich blend of natural beauty, wildlife and history, nestled between Tasmania’s larger islands.

It is partly private property and partly leasehold land, and is currently used for grazing Wiltshire Horn sheep. The island is part of the Franklin Sound Islands Important Bird Area, identified as such by BirdLife International because it holds over 1% of the world populations of six bird species.

== History of colonial times ==
Bass Strait sealers were living on the island by the 1820s. In 1831, George Robinson evicted the sealers and their families so that he could establish an Aboriginal settlement there (see below). After that venture proved unsuccessful, the sealers and their families returned to the island. Their community had grown to 28 people by the time the Anglican bishop, Francis Nixon, visited in 1854.

In 1842, the island was formally charted by HMS Beagle and renamed from Gun Carriage Island to Vansittart Island. "Vansittart" is a significant name, linked to the East India Company. Henry Vansittart was Governor of Bengal from 1759 to 1764, during the rule of the company in India.

After HMS Beagle returned to Van Diemen's Land in 1842, following its reverse circumference of Australia during 1842, via Timor and the Swan River, Western Australia, Lieutenant John Lort Stokes was affirmed as captain following the departure of then Captain Wickham at Brisbane due to sickness. Beagle joined the Van Diemen's Land government cutter, Vansittart (seconded from the Van Diemen's Land government as tender to HMS Beagle) for the purpose of charting Tasmania and Bass Strait. As part of that process, the name Gun Carriage Island, which had been given to it by the sealers, was officially changed to Vansittart Island.

Vansittart was a private sloop, with two cannon, which had arrived in Hobart from London via Cowes on 30 January 1836, with eight people aboard. Within days, Vansittart was sharing the harbour with HMS Beagle, after she berthed on 5 February 1836 under Captain Robert Fitzroy, with Charles Darwin and Lieutenant Wickham aboard, following their reverse circumnavigation of the globe. It was the first of two notable meetings between the two vessels. Vansittart traded between Hobart, Sydney, Kangaroo Island and Launceston prior to its purchase on 22 February 1837 for "search and rescue" by the colonial government of Van Diemen's Land (renamed Tasmania 1856).

Vansittart became a government revenue cutter and frequently visited the convict settlement at Port Arthur. She is purported to have transported Tasmanian Aborigines from the main island of Van Diemen's Land to Flinders Island Group, in a failed attempt to resettle them there. The California gold rush had begun in 1848, and Vansittart was lost at sea in 1849 when sailing from Sydney to California as a private vessel under Master Gill.

== Flora and fauna ==
Most of the original vegetation of the island has been cleared by the use of fire and by bulldozers with chains, destroying many stands of Oyster Bay pine.

Recorded breeding seabird and wader species are little penguin, Pacific gull, sooty oystercatcher and pied oystercatcher. Black swans have nested on the island, which is also a refuge for Cape Barren geese. Reptiles present include tiger snake, copperhead snake, white-lipped grass snake, southern grass skink, metallic skink and Bougainville's skink. Echidnas are present, though the Tasmanian pademelon is extinct there.

== See also ==
- List of islands of Tasmania
- Cooties Reef
