= One guilder coin (1922–1945) =

Dutch coin

1 Guilder
- The Netherlands
- Value: 1.00 Gulden Dutch guilder
- Mass: 10.00 g
- Diameter: 21.3 mm
- Thickness: ? mm
- Edge: Plain, God be with us ("GOD ZIJ MET ONS")
- Orientation: coin
- Composition: 72% Ag, 28% Cu
- Years of minting: 1922~1945 (Utrecht, Philadelphia, Denver)
- Mintage: ?
- Circulation: ?– 1 October 1948

Obverse
- Design: Queen Wilhelmina
- Designer: J.C. Wienecke

Reverse
- Design: Face value, year, privy mark (left), mint mark (right). Coat of arms. Country-designation.
- Designer: ?

The Dutch 1 guilder coin struck under the reign of Queen Wilhelmina was a unit of currency in the Netherlands.

== History ==
As a result of the rising silver price after the First World War, from 1922 onward it was decided that the silver content of most Dutch coins would be lowered. Thus a new design was necessary.

== Design ==
The design of the one guilder coin has not changed much between 1818 and 1945.

The obverse depicts:

- Portrait of Wilhelmina facing left.
- Title of Wilhelmina: "WILHELMINA KONINGIN DER NEDERLANDEN"; Wilhelmina, queen of the Netherlands.

The reverse depicts:

- The year of mintage
- Value (1 – G).
- Privy mark (left of the coat of arms), of the director of the Utrecht-mint.
- Mint mark (right of the coat of arms) of the Utrecht-mint.
- The Crowned Dutch coat of arms.
- Country-designation: "MUNT VAN HET KONINGRIJK DER NEDERLANDEN"; Coin of the kingdom of the Netherlands.

The edge: Smooth with incused lettering, ★ GOD ★ ZIJ ★ MET ★ ONS.
