= Australian Antarctic Medal =

Australian meritorious service medal

- Medal and ribbon
- Type: Medal (Meritorious)
- Awarded for: Outstanding service in scientific research or exploration, or in support of such work, in the course of, or in connection with, an Australian Antarctic expedition
- Description: 32 mm nickel-silver octagonal medal, ensigned with a hexagonal ice-crystal device, surmounted by a plain suspender bar, and suspended on a 32 mm snow-white moire ribbon, edged with three shades of blue.
- Presented by: Governor-General of Australia
- Eligibility: Australian Antarctic expedition members and support staff
- Post-nominals: AAM
- Status: Active
- Established: 2 June 1987 (as Antarctic Medal)
- First award: 22 June 1987
- Final award: 2023 Special Honours

Highlights
- Total: 115
- Total awarded posthumously: 4
- Total recipients: 103

Order of Wear
- Next (higher): Conspicuous Service Medal (CSM)
- Next (lower): Royal Victorian Medal (RVM)
- Related: Polar Medal

The Australian Antarctic Medal (stylised AAM as post-nominal), originally designated the Antarctic Medal until 18 December 1997, is a meritorious service award of the Australian honours and awards system, instituted by Letters Patent (Note: In Australia, Letters Patent are an official prerogative instrument of law making, made under the royal prerogative (which is that power of the Crown still existing and not superseded by parliamentary legislation), enabled by section 61 of the Australian Constitution. As the Sovereign has remained the font of "all honour and dignity" in Australia, the practice of instituting Australian honours and awards via Letters Patent continues, although in practice the role of the Sovereign is very limited, as Letters Patent are drafted by the government of the day and by convention the Sovereign is guided by the advice of that government to sign them, making the role taken by the Sovereign overwhelmingly symbolic.) on 2 June 1987 (amended 18 December 1997 and 13 December 2011).

Unique among the Australian meritorious service awards, the Australian Antarctic Medal may be awarded to the same person more than once. The medal may be awarded to anyone who has given outstanding service in connection with an Antarctic expedition, in scientific research, exploration, or in support of such work. Except in exceptional circumstances however, the medal will only be awarded if the nominee has also worked at least 12 months (cumulative) in Antarctic climates south of latitude 60° South, or in similar climate and terrain conditions elsewhere in the Antarctic region.

The Australian Antarctic Medal is also unique in that (other than the first time when it was awarded, which occurred on 22 June 1987) awardees are announced in their own Midwinter's Day (21 June) awards list.

The Australian Antarctic Medal has only in one instance been awarded to the same person twice - to Graham Robertson - and only four times posthumously (to Howard Burton, Neil Adams, John Oakes, and Patrick Quilty AM).

== Design ==
The Australian Antarctic Medal is a nickel-silver octagonal medal, 32 mm in diameter, ensigned with a hexagonal ice-crystal device, surmounted by a plain suspender bar. The obverse (front of the medal) bears a depiction of the Southern Hemisphere showing Australia and the Antarctic enclosed by the inscription "FOR OUTSTANDING SERVICE IN THE ANTARCTIC".

Reverse of Australian Antarctic Medal

The reverse (back) of the Australian Antarctic Medal has an Antarctic expeditioner outside Mawson's hut, leaning into a blizzard as they use an ice-axe.

The Australian Antarctic Medal is suspended on a 32 mm snow-white moire ribbon, (Note: Formally known as the riband.) with 3 mm edging of three shades of blue that merge into the white of the ribbon (representing the transition of water to ice as one approaches Antarctica). A date bar, being a nickel-silver clasp of 30 mm wide and 6 mm high, inscribed with the year the eligible service was rendered, is attached to the ribbon of the medal.

Second and subsequent awards of the Australian Antarctic Medal are recognised by the awarding of another nickel-silver date bar clasp, worn on the ribbon above the medal (and positioned above any earlier date bar clasps), and by the use of 9 mm replicas of the ice-crystal device for each subsequent award on the ribbon bar (worn on uniforms when not wearing the medal).

The miniature of the Australian Antarctic Medal is a half-sized replica of the medal, suspended from a miniature of the ribbon that is 16 mm wide. Half-sized replicas of date bar clasps are worn on the ribbon of the miniature medal.

A lapel badge, being a 10 mm wide replica of the hexagonal ice-crystal device used on the medal, is also provided to awardees.

== History ==
Prior to 2 June 1987, (Note: The last award of the Polar Medal under the Imperial honours system in Australia was on 5 May 1982. Before 1968, the Polar Medal was not a meritorious service medal but recognised those who had wintered in the Arctic and Antarctic while on expedition.) eligible service on Australian Antarctic expeditions (known as Australian National Antarctic Research Expeditions at that time) was recognised by the Polar Medal under the Imperial honours system.

=== Origins ===
When Australian Prime Minister Bob Hawke came to power in 1983, he declared his government would no longer be making any recommendations for Imperial honours and awards. The Australian Antarctic Names and Medals Committee, which had been set up by Ministerial appointment, declared at its meeting of 3 December 1984 that an Australian award should be created to honour outstanding achievement in the Australian Antarctic Territory, including for scientific achievement and exploration, and outlined some design specifications for the proposed medal. On 26 January 1986, Hawke announced the intention to seek Letters Patent for a new meritorious service award to recognise extraordinary service in the Antarctic region by Australian polar expeditioners, to be called the Australian Antarctic Medal.

Initial designs of the medal were drafted by Michael Tracey, but the Australian Antarctic Names and Medals Committee expressed some dissatisfaction with some of his design elements, and Stuart Devlin AO CMG replaced him as designer (although Tracey's map on the obverse of the medal was retained). Stuart Devlin's final design was approved by the government on 21 January 1987.

On 2 June 1987, the Queen of Australia, Elizabeth II, issued Letters Patent instituting the Antarctic Medal.

=== Production delays ===
Although 16 inaugural awardees of the Antarctic Medal were announced on 22 June 1987, covering meritorious service as far back as 1981, extended production delays with the Antarctic Medal and its ribbon resulted in it taking two years before these medals were presented to them.

=== Renaming and post-nominals ===
In 1993, the then Keating federal government established a Review of Australian Honours and Awards Committee, to make recommendations about the Australian honours and awards system. The committee delivered its report in 1995, and one of its recommendations was that the Antarctic Medal be renamed the Australian Antarctic Medal, and be granted the post-nominal AAM (the preceding Imperial Polar Medal and the Antarctic Medal had no entitlement to use of a post-nominal).

On 18 December 1997, the Queen of Australia, Elizabeth II, issued Letters Patent authorising the amendment of the original Letters Patent to change the designation of the Antarctic Medal to the Australian Antarctic Medal and authorised the use of the AAM post-nominal to those who had been awarded this medal.

=== Expansion of eligibility ===
Prior to 13 December 2011, the conditions for the award of the Australian Antarctic Medal were that, except in exceptional circumstances, only those who had accumulated 12 months or more in Antarctic climate and terrain conditions, and who had given outstanding service in (either directly, or in support of) scientific research or exploration, in the course of, or in connection with, an Australian Antarctic expedition were eligible to be considered for this meritorious award.

On 13 December 2011, the Queen of Australia, Elizabeth II, issued Letters Patent authorising the amendment of the original Letters Patent (and its regulations) to allow eligibility for the Australian Antarctic Medal to be expanded so that persons representing an Australian agency or institution on foreign Antarctic expeditions could also be considered for this medal.

== List of recipients ==
As at Midwinter's Day (21 June) 2020, the Australian Antarctic Medal (also known as the Antarctic Medal prior to 1998) has been awarded 104 times to 103 individuals (one person has received the medal twice). In four cases the medal was awarded posthumously. Apart from its inaugural award, which occurred on 22 June 1987, it has always been awarded on Midwinter's Day, although in some years no awards have been made (2003, 2010, 2014, 2015, 2017 and 2019).

From 1987 to 1991, no short citation was given when the medal was awarded. From 1992 to 1997, the short citation For outstanding service in connection with Australian Antarctic expeditions was used. In 1998, the short citation For outstanding service in support of Australia's Antarctic Program was used. From 1999 to 2011 the short citation For outstanding service in support of Australian Antarctic expeditions was used. Generic short citations were replaced with individual short citations from 2012 until 2016, when short citations were no longer given.

The only awardee to have received the Australian Antarctic Medal twice (where an additional clasp is given to the recipient, to place on the ribbon of the medal, and the ice crystal device is worn on the ribbon bar, when the medal is not worn) is Graham Robertson (who received his medal in 1989, and his additional clasp in 2012).

The four posthumous awards made to date are to Howard Burton (d. 5 November 1993) in 1994, Neil Adams (d. 23 March 2012) in 2012, John Oakes (d. 23 July 2016) in 2018, and Patrick Quilty (d. 26 August 2018) in 2020.

Date awarded	Name	Post-nominals	Details	Notes
22 June 1987	Ricky Besso	AAM	For outstanding service as Senior Carpenter (Davis 1985) in support of science and general expedition duties.	
22 June 1987	David Andrew Blaby	AAM	For outstanding service as Plant Inspector (Mawson 1980) in support of science and general expedition duties.	
22 June 1987	Harry Roy Burton	AAM	For outstanding service in Antarctic scientific research (biology, limnology) and in support of general expedition duties.	
22 June 1987	John Gerard Corcoran	AAM	For outstanding service (Casey 1980) in Antarctic exploration (surveying) and in support of science and general expedition duties.	
22 June 1987	Charles Henry Lewis Cosgrove	AAM	For outstanding service (Mawson 1982) in support of science and general expedition duties.	
22 June 1987	Malcolm Charles Ellson	AAM	For outstanding service (Davis 1985) in support of science and general expedition duties.	
22 June 1987	Anthony Peter Everett	AAM	For outstanding service (Mawson 1985) in support of science and general expedition duties.	
22 June 1987	Lloyd Douglas Fletcher	AAM	For outstanding service as Medical Officer (Casey 1986) in support of science and general expedition duties.	
22 June 1987	Raymond John Morris	AAM	For outstanding service (Davis 1985) in Antarctic scientific research (physics) and in support of general expedition duties.	
22 June 1987	Robert Campbell Orchard	AAM	For outstanding service as Communications Officer (Davis 1984) in support of science and general expedition duties.	
22 June 1987	David Arnold Pottage	AAM	For outstanding service (Mawson 1985) in Antarctic scientific research (meteorology) and in support of general expedition duties.	
22 June 1987	Donald Alexander Reid	AAM	For outstanding service as Carpenter (Davis 1986) in support of science and general expedition duties.	
22 June 1987	Shane Anthony Rollins	AAM	For outstanding service as Senior Diesel Mechanic (Davis 1982) in support of science and general expedition duties.	
22 June 1987	Ulrich Schmitter	AAM	For outstanding service as Cook (Casey 1980) in support of science and general expedition duties.	(Note: Ulrich Schmitter was previously awarded the Imperial Polar Medal on 23 December 1980, and is whom Schmitter Peak, a small mountain peak in the Prince Charles Mountains region of Antarctic, is named after.)
22 June 1987	Peter Graham Sullivan	AAM	For outstanding service as Medical Officer (Davis 1985) in support of science and general expedition duties.	
22 June 1987	Herman Henk Edward Westerhof	AAM	For outstanding service as Radio Technical Officer (Casey 1981) in support of science and general expedition duties.	
21 June 1988	Ian Frederick Allison	AO, AAM, FAA	For outstanding service in Antarctic scientific research (glaciology) and in support of general expedition duties.	(Note: Dr Ian Allison received the Phillip Law Medal in 2013 for outstanding service to Antarctic science.)
21 June 1988	Martin Stephen Betts	AAM	For outstanding service as Voyage Leader in support of science and general expedition duties.	
21 June 1988	Neil Joseph Conrick	AAM	For outstanding service as Carpenter (Macquarie Island 1987) in support of science and general expedition duties.	
21 June 1988	Maxwell Cecil Dietrich	AAM	For outstanding service as Foreman (Mawson 1986) in support of science and general expedition duties.	
21 June 1988	William Leslie Robinson	AAM	For outstanding service as Chef (Casey 1987) in support of science and general expedition duties.	
21 June 1988	Bernard William Sorensen	AAM	For outstanding service as Chef (Mawson 1986) in support of science and general expedition duties.	
21 June 1989	Denise Mary Allen	AAM	For outstanding service (Davis 1988) in Antarctic scientific research (meteorology) and in support of general expedition duties.	(Note: Denise Allen participated in the Australian Antarctic culture oral history project, which can be accessed via the reference.)
21 June 1989	Willem Philip Barnaart	AAM	For outstanding service as Station Leader (Mawson 1988) in support of science and general expedition duties.	(Note: Willem Barnaart was the first person to have been station leader at all four permanent Australian Antarctic stations (Mawson, Davis, Casey and Macquarie Island).)
21 June 1989	David Rockley McCormack	AAM	For outstanding service as Plant Inspector (Mawson 1988) in support of science and general expedition duties.	(Note: Dave McCormack was previously awarded the Imperial Polar Medal on 23 December 1980. David McCormack also received the Phillip Law Medal in 2017 for outstanding service in the recovery and preservation of Antarctic heritage artefacts.)
21 June 1989	Daniel Henry O'Reilly	AAM	For outstanding service as Construction Services Leader (Davis 1988) in support of science and general expedition duties.	
21 June 1989	Russell Albert Rachinger	AAM	For outstanding service as Station Leader (Casey 1987) in support of science and general expedition duties.	
21 June 1989	Graham George Robertson	AAM	For outstanding service (Mawson 1988) in Antarctic scientific research (biology) and in support of general expedition duties.	
21 June 1989	Diana Lynn Williams	AAM	For outstanding service (Heard Island 1986) in Antarctic scientific research (medicine) and in support of general expedition duties as Medical Officer.	
21 June 1990	David John Grant	AAM	For outstanding service (Mawson 1989) in Antarctic scientific research (meteorology) and in support of general expedition duties.	
21 June 1990	Roderick Bentley Ledingham	AAM	For outstanding service in support of science and general expedition duties.	
21 June 1990	Robert John Tingey	AAM	For outstanding service in Antarctic scientific research (geology) and in support of general expedition duties.	
21 June 1990	Dudley Raymond Twigg	AAM	For outstanding service as Senior Technical Officer (Radio) in support of science and general expedition duties.	(Note: Dudley Twigg was previously awarded the Imperial Polar Medal on 21 July 1961 (Polar Medals before 1968 were not a meritorious service medal but recognised those who had wintered in the Arctic and Antarctic while on expedition).)
21 June 1990	Egon Wehrle	AAM	For outstanding service in support of science and general expedition duties.	
21 June 1990	Charlie Robert Reid Weir	AAM	For outstanding service (Macquarie Island 1989) in support of science and general expedition duties.	
21 June 1991	Peter James Gormly	AAM	For outstanding service as Senior Medical Officer in support of science and general expedition duties.	
21 June 1991	Graham John Mills	AAM	For outstanding service as Plant Inspector (Davis 1990) in support of science and general expedition duties.	
21 June 1991	Eric William Osborn	AAM	For outstanding service as Carpenter (Davis 1990) in support of science and general expedition duties.	
21 June 1991	William Royce Ware	AAM	For outstanding service in support of meteorological science and general expedition duties.	
21 June 1992	Murray James Hotchin	AAM	For outstanding service as Electrical Works Supervisor in support of science and general expedition duties.	
21 June 1992	Jeffrey Roger Mackereth	AAM	For outstanding service as Electrical Fitter (Macquarie Island 1991) in support of science and general expedition duties.	
21 June 1992	Richard Williams	AAM	For outstanding service in Antarctic scientific research (marine biology) and general expedition duties.	
21 June 1993	Albert Bruehwiler	AAM	For outstanding service as Plant Inspector (Mawson 1990) in support of science and general expedition duties.	
21 June 1993	David James Hasick	AAM	For outstanding service as Station Leader (Mawson 1992) in support of science and general expedition duties.	
21 June 1993	Knowles Ronald Kerry	AAM	For outstanding service in Antarctic scientific research (biology) and in support of general expedition duties.	
21 June 1993	Paul John Munro	AAM	For outstanding service as Senior Electrical Fitter (Mawson 1992) in support of science and general expedition duties.	
21 June 1993	Ray James Pike	AAM	For outstanding service as Construction Foreman (Mawson 1992) in support of science and general expedition duties.	
21 June 1994	Russell James Brand	AAM	For outstanding service as Plant Inspector in support of science and general expedition duties.	
21 June 1994	Howard Douglas Burton	AAM	For outstanding service in support of science and general expedition duties.	
21 June 1994	Geoffrey James Moore	AAM	For outstanding service in Antarctic scientific research (biology) and general expedition duties.	
21 June 1995	Erwin Erb	AAM	For outstanding service in Antarctic scientific research (biology) and in support of general expedition duties.	
21 June 1995	Peter Damian Franzmann	AAM	For outstanding service in Antarctic scientific research (microbiology) and in support of general expedition duties.	
21 June 1995	Norman Leigh Hornsby	AAM	For outstanding service as Senior Helicopter Pilot in support of science and general expedition duties.	
21 June 1995	Robert Patrick Kiernan	AAM	For outstanding service (Davis 1994) in Antarctic exploration (surveying) and in support of science and general expedition duties.	
21 June 1995	Vincent Ivor Morgan	AAM	For outstanding service in Antarctic scientific research (glaciology) and general expedition duties.	
21 June 1995	Meredy Jayne Zwar	AAM	For outstanding service as Chef (Mawson 1994) in support of science and general expedition duties.	
21 June 1996	Judith Rebekah Clarke	AAM	For outstanding service in Antarctic scientific research (biology) and in support of general expedition duties.	
21 June 1996	Trevor Michael Craven	AAM	For outstanding service in Antarctic scientific research (glaciology) and general expedition duties.	
21 June 1996	Robert Tracy Jones	AAM	For outstanding service as Station Leader (Mawson 1994) in support of science and general expedition duties.	
21 June 1996	Allen Carey Rooke	AAM	For outstanding service as Communications Officer (Macquarie Island 1994) in support of science and general expedition duties.	
21 June 1996	Lloyd Peter Symons	AAM	For outstanding service as Electronic Engineer (Davis 1995) in support of science and general expedition duties.	
21 June 1997	Paul Robert Delaney	AAM	For outstanding service as Construction Foreman (Mawson 1996) in support of science and general expedition duties.	
21 June 1998	Robert Leslie Easther	AAM	For outstanding service in support of science and general expedition duties.	
21 June 1999	Michael Robert Whittle	AAM	For outstanding service in support of science and general expedition duties.	
21 June 2000	John Joseph Jones	AAM	For outstanding service as Trades Team Leader (Davis 1998) in support of science and general expedition duties.	
21 June 2000	Nicolas Andrew Mortimer	AAM	For outstanding service as search and rescue team member (Mawson 1999) in support of science and general expedition duties.	
21 June 2000	Andrew Jason Reinke	AAM	For outstanding service as search and rescue team member (Mawson 1999) in support of science and general expedition duties.	
21 June 2000	Garry Iain Watson	AAM	For outstanding service as search and rescue team member (Mawson 1999) in support of science and general expedition duties.	
21 June 2000	Madeleine Wilcock	AAM	For outstanding service as Medical Officer (Mawson 1999) in support of science and general expedition duties.	
21 June 2001	Alan Elcheikh	AAM	For outstanding service in Antarctic scientific research (glaciology) and in support of general expedition duties.	
21 June 2001	Joseph Vaughan Johnson	CSC, OAM, AAM, RFD, ED	For outstanding service in support of science and general expedition duties.	
21 June 2001	Ian John McLean	AAM	For outstanding service as Senior Communication Technical Officer in support of science and general expedition duties.	
21 June 2001	Dale Allan Main	AAM	For outstanding service as Communication Technical Officer in support of science and general expedition duties.	
21 June 2001	Peter Helmut Sprunk	AAM	For outstanding service in support of science and general expedition duties.	
21 June 2001	Michael Stephen Stone	AAM	For outstanding service as Plant Inspector (Casey 1999) in support of science and general expedition duties.	
21 June 2002	Jonathan James Reeve	AAM	For outstanding service as Marine Science Support Manager in support of science and general expedition duties.	
21 June 2004	Patricia Margaret Selkirk	AC,AAM	For outstanding service in Antarctic scientific research (terrestrial science) and in support of general expedition duties.	(Note: Dr Patricia Selkirk received the Phillip Law Medal in 2018 for outstanding contributions to Antarctic science.)
21 June 2005	Geoffrey Reginald Copson	AAM	For outstanding service in Antarctic scientific research (biology) and in support of general expedition duties.	
21 June 2005	Andrew Graeme Tink	AAM	For outstanding service as Chef in support of science and general expedition duties.	
21 June 2006	Per Brun Larsen	AAM	For outstanding service as Bo'sun (RSV Aurora Australia) in support of science and general expedition duties.	
21 June 2007	Sharon Rae Labudda	AAM	For outstanding service as Senior Aircraft Ground Support Officer in support of science and general expedition duties.	
21 June 2008	Matthew Wayne Filipowski	AAM	For outstanding service as the Wilkins Runway Construction Supervisor in support of science and general expedition duties.	
21 June 2009	David Ernest Pullinger	AAM	For outstanding service in position of Helicopter Pilot in support of science and general expedition duties.	
21 June 2011	Murray Patrick Doyle	AAM	For outstanding service as Master of the RSV Aurora Australis in support of science and general expedition duties.	
21 June 2011	Stephen Nicol	AAM	For outstanding service in Antarctic scientific research (marine biology) and in support of general expedition duties.	
21 June 2012	Graham George Robertson	AAM and Bar	For continued outstanding research on seabird mortality in long line fisheries.	
21 June 2012	Neil David Adams	AAM	For outstanding contributions to the development of the science of Antarctic meteorology.	
21 June 2012	James Doube	AAM	For outstanding contributions to the theory and practice of polar medicine.	
21 June 2012	Stephen Rich Rintoul	AAM	For outstanding contributions as Leader, Antarctic Climate and Ecosystems Cooperative Research Oceans Program.	
21 June 2013	Scott Francis Laughlin	AAM	For outstanding service to the Australian Antarctic program as a crew member and Master of the RSV Aurora Australis.	
21 June 2013	Barbara Christine Wienecke	AAM	For outstanding service to research into sea birds and the effect of commercial fishing operations on sea bird populations.	
21 June 2016	John Frederick Cadden	AAM	For outstanding service as Expedition Medical Officer in support of science and general expedition duties.	
21 June 2016	Kym Blair Newbery	AAM	For outstanding service as Electronics Engineer in support of science and general expedition duties.	
21 June 2016	Robert William Rowland	AAM	For outstanding service as Plumber in support of science and general expedition duties.	
21 June 2018	Graham David Cook	AAM	For outstanding service as Station Leader in support of science and general expedition duties.	
21 June 2018	Garry Studd	AAM	For outstanding service as Senior Pilot in support of science and general expedition duties.	
21 June 2018	Martin Travers Tucker	AAM	For outstanding service as Fisheries Observer in support of science and general expedition duties.	
21 June 2018	John Alfred Oakes	AAM	For outstanding service as Helicopter Pilot in support of science and general expedition duties.	
21 June 2020	Simon Cross	AAM	For outstanding service as Field Training Officer in support of science and general expedition duties.	
21 June 2020	Bradley Allen Collins	AAM	For outstanding service as Refuelling Supervisor in support of science and general expedition duties.	
21 June 2020	Alison Audrey Dean	AAM	For outstanding service as Station Leader in support of science and general expedition duties.	
21 June 2020	Leanne Mary Millhouse	AAM	For outstanding service in support of science and general expedition duties.	
21 June 2020	Patrick Gerard Quilty	AM, AAM	For his outstanding contribution to Antarctic science.	(Note: Professor Patrick Quilty received the Phillip Law Medal in 2016 for outstanding service to Antarctic science.)
21 June 2020	Colin Jeffrey Southwell	AAM	For outstanding service in Antarctic scientific research (biology) and in support of general expedition duties.	
21 June 2021	Nicholas John Gales	AAM	For his outstanding contribution to the Australian Antarctic Program, particularly his leadership in Antarctic and Southern Ocean scientific research by developing a marine mammal program in the Southern Ocean.	
21 June 2021	Timothy Price	AAM	For his outstanding contribution to the Australian Antarctic Program, particularly in his capacity as a trade supervisor, station leader and expeditioner, ensuring the effective operation of Antarctic Research Station infrastructure and communities.	
21 June 2021	Patti Virtue	AAM	For her outstanding contribution to the Australian Antarctic Program, particularly in her efforts in mentoring and teaching the next generation of Antarctic ecologists.	
21 June 2021	Donna Faye Wightman	AAM	For her outstanding contribution to the Australian Antarctic Program, particularly in her capacity as Chef and Deputy Station Leader, especially during the 2015-2016 transition of expeditioners following the grounding of the Aurora Australis.	
21 June 2023	Robert Anders King	AAM	For his outstanding contribution to the Australian Antarctic Program, particularly through innovative research in marine biology.	
21 June 2023	Aaron Charles Read	AAM	For his outstanding contribution to the Australian Antarctic Program, particularly through the establishment and leadership of the Wilkins Ice Runway Aerodrome in East Antarctica.	
21 June 2023	Lisa Anne Wilkinson	AAM	For her outstanding contribution to the Australian Antarctic Program, particularly through advocacy for diversity and inclusion.	
21 June 2025	Jan Marie Wallace	AAM	For her outstanding contribution to Australia’s Antarctic Program, particularly through remote medicine practices.	
21 June 2025	Christopher Johnson Carson	AAM	For his outstanding contributions to Australia’s Antarctic Program, particularly through geoscientific research and fostering international scientific collaboration.	
21 June 2026	Shaun Christopher Gillies	AAM	For outstanding contribution to Australia’s Antarctic program, through fostering resilient and cohesive station communities.	
21 June 2026	Jennifer Susan McGhee	AAM	For outstanding contribution to Australia’s Antarctic Program, through leadership in fostering safe, inclusive and resilient station communities.	
21 June 2026	Clive Reginald McMahon	AAM	For outstanding contribution to Australia’s Antarctic Program, in marine mammal telemetry and ocean observing systems.	

== See also ==
- Australian honours and awards system
- Australian Honours Order of Wearing
- Australian Antarctic Division
- Australian National Antarctic Research Expeditions
- Casey Station
- Davis Station
- Mawson Station
- Macquarie Island Station
