= Patrick Quilty =

Australian paleontologist

Patrick Gerard Quilty AM AAM (20 March 1939 – 26 August 2018) was an Australian geologist and paleontologist who specialised in the surface and subsurface earth sciences of Antarctica. The Quilty Nunataks are named for his initial service in Antarctica, at which time he was connected to the University of Wisconsin. He later continued his Antarctic service with the University of Tasmania, rising to the position of chief scientist with the Australian Antarctic Division (AAD) of the Australian Department of the Environment.

On 18 June 2016, Quilty was awarded the Phillip Law Medal for his outstanding contribution to Antarctica and the Antarctic community. On 21 June 2020, he was posthumously awarded the Australian Antarctic Medal for outstanding service in Antarctic scientific research (especially in the fields of geology and palaeontology) and for his support of such research as head of the Australian Antarctic Division's science division between December 1980 and February 1999.
