= Ian Allison =

Ian Allison may refer to:

- Ian Allison (basketball) (1909–1990), Scottish born Canadian basketball player
- Ian Allison (scientist), Australian glaciologist and climate scientist
