= Denise Mary Allen =

Australian Antarctic meteorologist

Denise Allen
- Born: 1954 (age 71–72); Pinnaroo, South Australia
- Awards: Australian Antarctic Medal
- Scientific career
- Workplaces: Australian Antarctic Division

Denise Allen AAM is a Meteorology Observer and Forecaster who worked with the Bureau of Meteorology.

== Early life ==
Born in Pinnaroo, South Australia 1954, Allen initially trained as a teacher at the University of Adelaide, but became more interested in other fields and moved to the Bureau of Meteorology (BOM) where she developed her interest in Antarctica.

In 1986, she received her amateur radio licence and used the callsign VKOYL. She said she would rarely use her microphone after becoming too popular and was often flooded with calls from fellow DXers.

== Career and impact ==
Allen first arrived in Antarctica in 1985, working as an Observer for BOM at Macquarie Island. Over the next several years, Allen worked in Antarctica as an Observer and Senior Observer, before returning in 2005 as Meteorology OIC, and finally as Senior Meteorological Observer in 2007. All together she took nine trips to Antarctica spending six winters there between 1985 and 2007, and became the first woman to winter at each of the four Australian Antarctic stations in 1992.

After 29 years with BOM, Allen retired and has worked with the ANARE Club as National Social Secretary and Information Technology co-ordinator. She continued to visit Antarctica in this capacity.

== Awards and honours ==
On June 21, 1989, Allen was awarded the Australian Government's Australian Antarctic Medal for outstanding service as a pioneer for women in Antarctica and in support of general expedition duties and Antarctic research. She was presented with the 1989 Antarctic Medal at Government House, Melbourne on 25 October 1989 by the Governor of Victoria, Dr Davis McCaughey. Denise and fellow 1989 medal recipient, Medical Officer Diana Lynn Williams, are jointly the first women to receive the award.
