= Knowles Kerry =

Australian scientist in Antarctica

Knowles Ronald Kerry AAM
- Born: Knowles Ronald Kerry
- Education: BAgSci PhD
- Alma mater: University of Melbourne
- Known for: Founder of Marine Biology program of the Australian Antarctic Division
- Awards: Australian Antarctic Medal
- Scientific career
- Fields: Biochemistry, marine biology
- Institutions: Australian Antarctic Division

Knowles Ronald Kerry is an Australian biochemist and marine biologist known for his work in Antarctica, considered the 'father' of the Marine Biology program of the Australian Antarctic Division. He held positions including Principal Research Scientist and expedition leader with the Australian National Antarctic Research Expeditions (ANARE) including seven total years in Antarctica and sub-Antarctic regions.

== Career ==
Knowles Kerry began his career as a biochemist in the Gastroenterological Research Unit of the Royal Children's Hospital in Melbourne.

He embarked on his first of many expeditions to the Antarctic and sub-Antarctic after joining the Australian Antarctic Division (AAD), going to Macquarie Island in 1966. He later spent winter for the first time on Macquarie Island researching seal milk and albatross birds, after undertaking earlier research on animals in the Southern Ocean. This work was some of the first official scientific work other than physics by the Australian Government in Antarctica. This early work led to Kerry being instrumental in establishing the Marine Biology program at the AAD.

Later in his career he was instrumental in negotiating the Convention on the Conservation of Antarctic Marine Living Resources (CCAMLR) to improve the management of fisheries in Antarctic waters. Kerry served as a member of the Australian delegation and scientific delegate.

Through the 1980s he commenced leading a key research program on krill availability in Antarctic waters focused on Adélie penguins. Part of this program involved a homemade device used to spray orange paint onto penguins to mark them for research, displayed in the National Museum of Australia. This research culminated in its publication in 1990. The program continued with new technology including satellite tracking and depth recording. He continued further work on Adélie penguins and their behaviour, feeding habits and health for many decades.

Kerry was involved in several international programs of cooperation between Australia and other countries' Antarctic programs. In 1980 he was part of hosting the first research scientists from China to visit Antarctica at Casey Station. Between 1997 and 2006 he cooperated the Antarctic programs of Italy at Zucchelli Station in Terra Nova Bay and the United States at McMurdo Station.

== Awards and legacy ==
In 1995. Kerry was awarded the Australian Antarctic Medal for his services to Antarctic science.

Kerry Island, on the coast of mainland Antarctica, was named in his honour on 29 April 2009.

== Selected publications ==
- Kerry, K. R.; Hempel, G. (27 September 1990). Antarctic Ecosystems: Ecological Change and Conservation. Berlin, Germany: Springer Berlin Heidelberg. ISBN 978-3-540-52101-3.
- Health of Antarctic Wildlife: A challenge for Science and Policy (with Martin Riddle), Springer (2009) ISBN 978-3-540-93922-1.
- "Antarctic Winter". onesearch.slq.qld.gov.au. Australian Broadcasting Corporation.
- "Antarctic Summer". onesearch.slq.qld.gov.au. Australian Broadcasting Corporation.
