= Ian Allison (scientist) =

Australian glaciologist

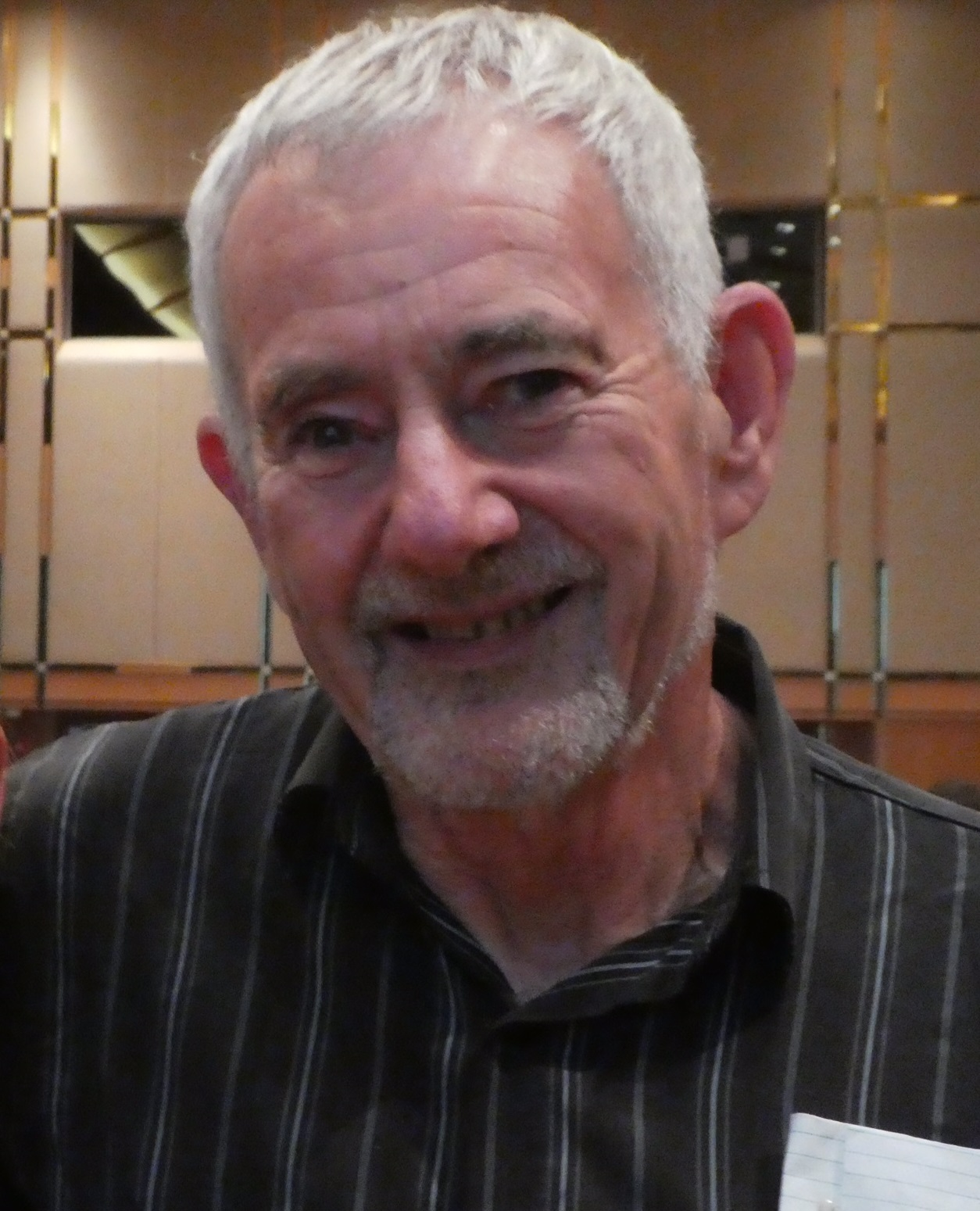
- Born: Ian Frederick Allison
- Education: University of Melbourne
- Known for: Work on the global climate system
- Awards: Fellow of the Australian Academy of Science, Officer of the Order of Australia
- Scientific career
- Fields: Glaciologist
- Institutions: Australian Antarctic Division

Ian Frederick Allison AO AAM FAA is an Australian glaciologist and climate scientist. He was elected a Fellow of the Australian Academy of Science in 2016 in recognition of his work in understanding the role of "sea ice and Antarctica in the global climate system".

== Career and impact ==
Allison received his MSc and PhD both in Meteorology from the University of Melbourne in 1970 and 1987 respectively.

He worked at the Australian Antarctic Division for 42 years. His research focuses on the global climate system and in particular the role of Antarctica in the world's climate. His research spans disciplines including ice shelf-ocean interaction, meteorology, glaciology and oceanography. Allison led or participated in 25 expeditions to Antarctica, and during this time he conducted foundational research on Antarctic sea ice. His research documented the seasonal change in sea ice driven by its interaction with the water column and the atmosphere.

Allison was a lead author of the Intergovernmental Panel on Climate Change (IPCC) Second, Fourth and Fifth Assessment Reports. He also co-chaired the Joint Committee for the International Polar Year 2007-2008.

== Awards and honours ==
Allison was awarded the Australian Antarctic Medal in 1988, was appointed an Officer of the Order of Australia in 2014 "For distinguished service to the environment as a glaciologist, to furthering international understanding of the science of the Antarctic region, and to climate research" and was elected a Fellow of the Australian Academy of Science in 2016. He was awarded Tasmanian Senior Australian of the Year in 2016.

Allison Glacier on the west side of Heard Island is named in his honour.
