= Barbara Wienecke =

Australian Antarctic ecologist

- Education: Murdoch University
- Awards: Australian Antarctic Medal
- Scientific career
- Fields: Seabird ecology
- Workplaces: Australian Antarctic Division

Barbara Wienecke AAM is a senior research scientist with the Australian Antarctic Division. She is a seabird ecologist who uses satellite tracking to investigate seabird population dynamics and ecology. Wienecke has played a key role in enhancing the quality of, and overseeing the implementation of, a number of Antarctic Specially Protected Area management plans for wildlife concentrations in East Antarctica.

== Early life and education ==
Wienecke was born in Namibia but graduated from high school in Germany. After travelling and living in a number of different countries, including Israel and the Netherlands, she moved to Australia to begin her bachelor's degree. She has a Bachelor of Science degree from Murdoch University, where she completed an honours thesis on the penguins of Penguin Island, Western Australia. This research led into a PhD from Murdoch University in Perth, Australia, which she completed in 1993.

== Career and impact ==
Wienecke is a seabird ecologist at the Australian Antarctic Division (AAD), where she has worked since 1993. She has been studying penguins and other seabirds for over twenty-five years, participating in over fifteen expeditions to Antarctica and the sub-Antarctic islands. Her first expedition was an overwintering expedition to Australia's Mawson Station in 1994, during which she was employed as a seabird ecologist conducting a field program on emperor penguins at Auster and Taylor Glacier for fourteen months.

Wienecke is primarily interested in the foraging ecology and population dynamics of seabirds, using satellite tracking to conduct research geared toward protecting seabirds and their habitat from humans and climate change. She also has collaborated on research mitigating the incidental bycatch of seabirds in commercial longline fisheries. This work has directly contributed to the Commission for the Conservation of Antarctic Marine Living Resources (CCAMLR) conservation measures, which led to a major reduction of bycatch in pelagic long-line fisheries.

She also was lead author of the 2011 five-yearly Australian report detailing the state of the East Antarctic environment and a co-author of BirdLife International's assessment of Important Bird Areas in Antarctica, a report identifying Antarctic sites and populations of international conservation significance.

== Awards and honors ==
In 2013, Wienecke was awarded the Australian Antarctic Division's Australian Antarctic Medal for "exemplary research into sea birds and the effect of commercial fishing operations on sea bird populations".

== Selected works ==
- Fretwell, P.T., LaRue, M.A., Morin, P., Kooyman, G.L., Wienecke, B., Ratcliffe, N., Fox, A.J., Fleming, A.H., Porter, C. and Trathan, P.N., 2012. An emperor penguin population estimate: the first global, synoptic survey of a species from space. PLoS One, 7(4), p.e33751.
- Robertson, G., McNeill, M., Smith, N., Wienecke, B., Candy, S. and Olivier, F., 2006. Fast sinking (integrated weight) longlines reduce mortality of white-chinned petrels (Procellaria aequinoctialis) and sooty shearwaters (Puffinus griseus) in demersal longline fisheries. Biological Conservation, 132 (4), pp. 458–471.
- Wienecke, B.C. and Robertson, G., 1997. Foraging space of emperor penguins Aptenodytes forsteri in Antarctic shelf waters in winter. Marine Ecology Progress Series, 159, pp. 249–263.
- Constable, A.J., Melbourne-Thomas, J., Corney, S.P., Arrigo, K.R., Barbraud, C., Barnes, D.K., Bindoff, N.L., Boyd, P.W., Brandt, A., Costa, D.P. and Davidson, A.T. et al. 2014. Climate change and Southern Ocean ecosystems I: how changes in physical habitats directly affect marine biota. Global Change Biology, 20 (10), pp. 3004–3025.
