= Olokemeji Forest Reserve =

Nigerian forest reserve

- Location within Nigeria
- Location: Between Abeokuta and Ibadan, Nigeria
- Nearest city: Lagos
- Coordinates: 7°15′N 3°20′E
- Area: 59 km^{2} (23 sq mi)
- Established: 1900
- Governing body: Ogun State Government

Olokemeji Forest Reserve is Nigeria's first Forest Reserve, established around 1900. The reserve covers about 5,900 hectares (23 sq mi; 59 km^{2}) and is located between the Nigerian cities of Abeokuta and Ibadan. While the reserve does contain freshwater swamp forest areas, particularly in the south, its primary composition is characterized by moist evergreen forest, often referred to as 'mixed rainforest'

The structure and composition of the woody flora at Olokemeji forest reserve reflect the significant anthropogenic interference that has taken place in the area. A 2016 paper recommended a holistic plan to alleviate farming pressures on the forest reserve, incorporating poverty alleviation measures and promoting sustainable farming practices to reduce dependence on extensive cultivation.
