= Hope Black =

Australian marine biologist

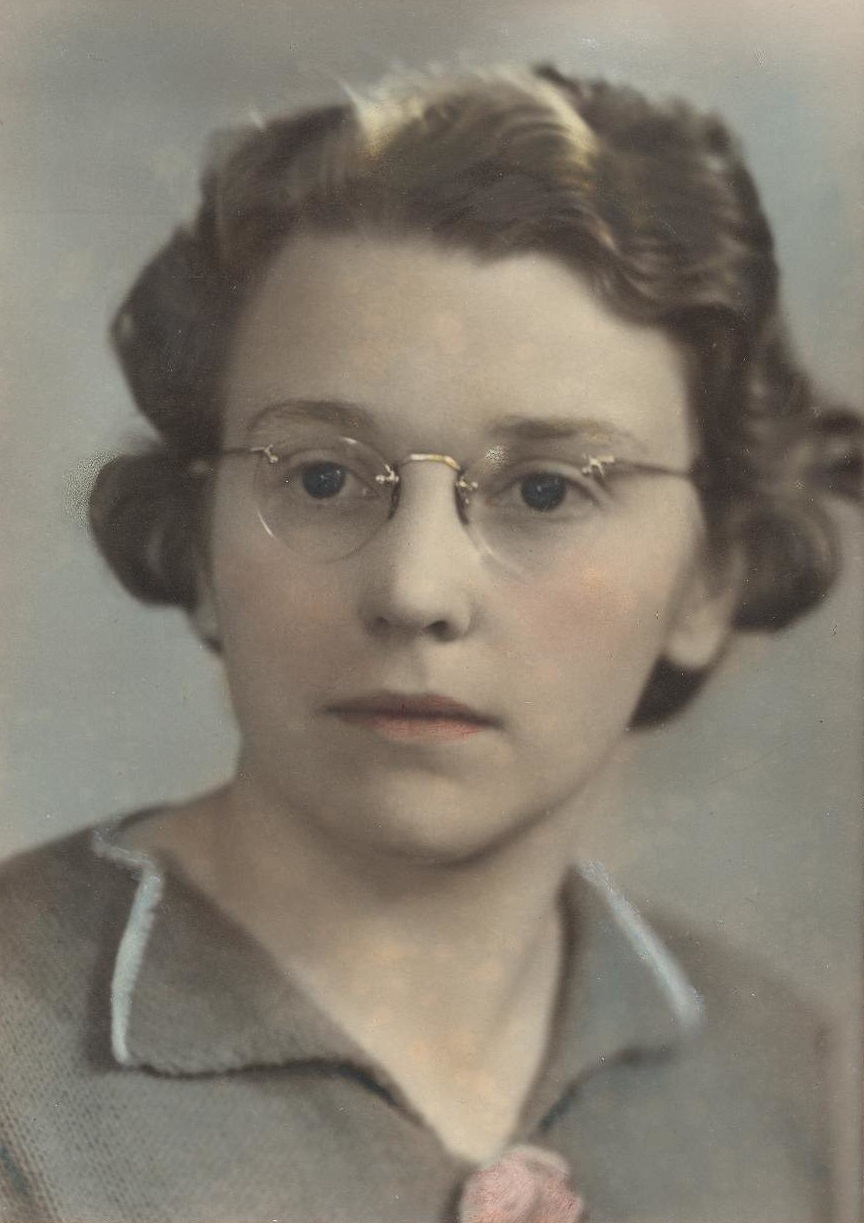
- Born: Jessica Hope MacPherson; 1919
- Died: January 25, 2018 (aged 98–99); Victoria Australia
- Citizenship: Australian
- Education: University of Melbourne
- Known for: First female curator at the National Museum of Victoria
- Scientific career
- Fields: Malacology, marine biology
- Workplaces: National Museum of Victoria

Jessica Hope Black (née MacPherson, 1919 – 25 January 2018) was an Australian scientist, a marine biologist and malacologist. In 1937 she started working at the National Museum of Victoria. Subsequently, she became Curator of Molluscs at the museum in 1946. One of the first four women to carry out research in the sub-Antarctic in 1959. She was the National Museum's first female curator. When she married in 1965, she was forced to leave the museum, and instead became a science teacher for thirteen years. In 2019 Lake Macpherson on Macquarie Island was named for her.

== Career ==
Appointed as Curator of Mollusks in 1946, Hope MacPherson was Australia's first female curator at the National Museum of Victoria.

Her tenure was brought to a close prematurely, when in 1965 she married and became Hope Black, requiring her retirement from the Victorian public service as a result of the marriage bar. Subsequently, Black worked for 13 years as a science teacher.

== Work in marine biology ==
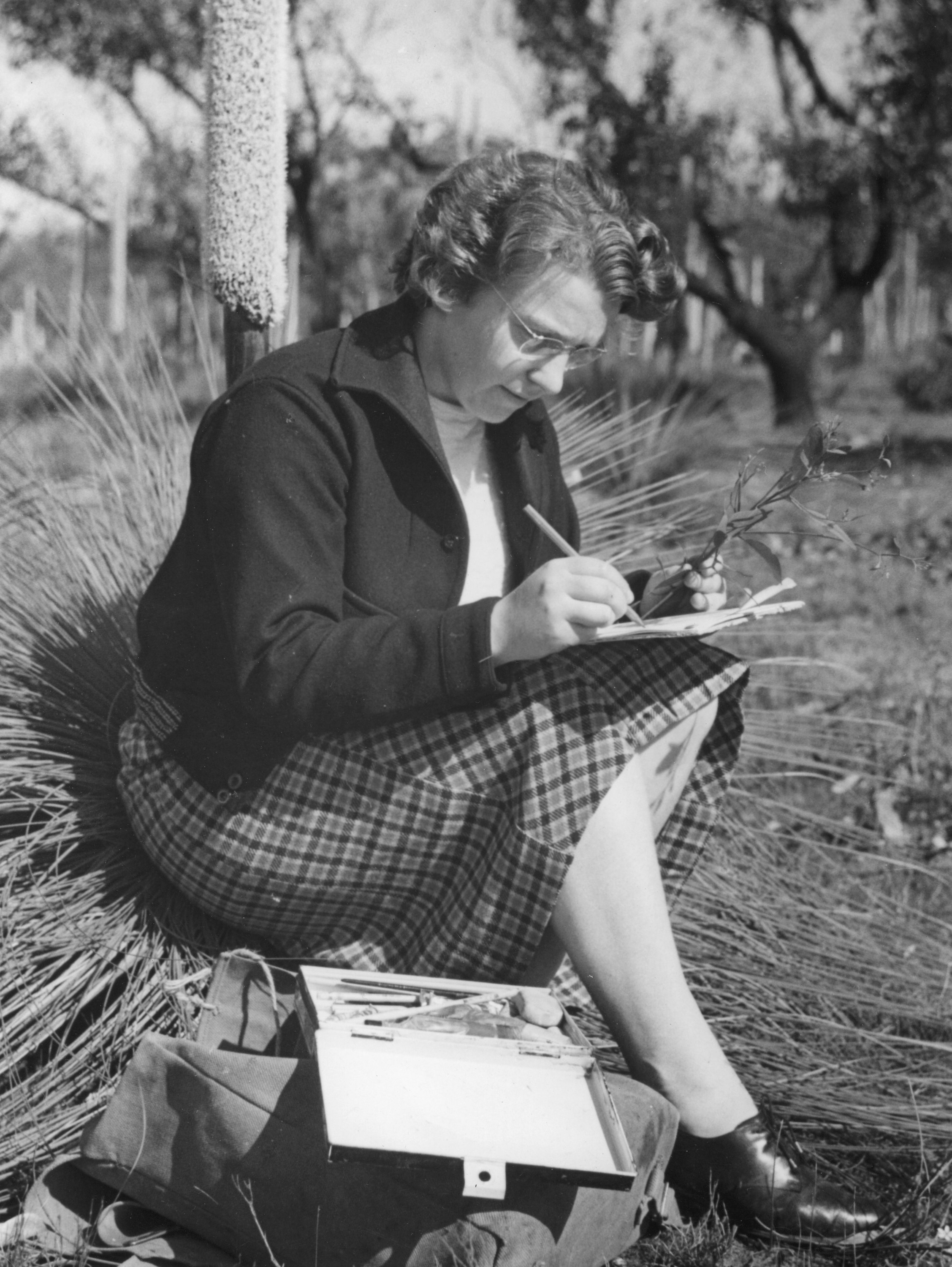
Portrait of Hope Black (circa 1950s)

Hope Black was initially employed in 1937 at Museum Victoria by the support of the Carnegie Corporation. She worked on developing and preparing new display cases for the McCoy Hall dioramas. In 1947 Black collaborated to survey the Snowy River Gorge on horseback, prior construction of the Snowy Mountains Hydroelectric Scheme.

Between 1957–1963, Black carried out biological surveys of Port Phillip Bay, and her results are still used as baseline data from which to measure environmental change in the area.

Black investigated the genus Teredo, a group of marine bivalve mollusks known as "shipworms". She also surveyed edible molluscs in Victoria. Ultimately, her mollusc research lead to her writing the book Molluscs of Victoria, which was published in 1962.

Notably, Black was also a member of a group of four women (also including Isobel Bennett, Susan Ingham and Mary Gillham) who were the first to carry out research in the sub-Antarctic in 1959. She was inducted into the Victorian Honour Roll of Women in 2012. In 2019 Lake Macpherson on Macquarie Island was named for her.
