= Cooties Reef =

Place in Bass Strait, Australia

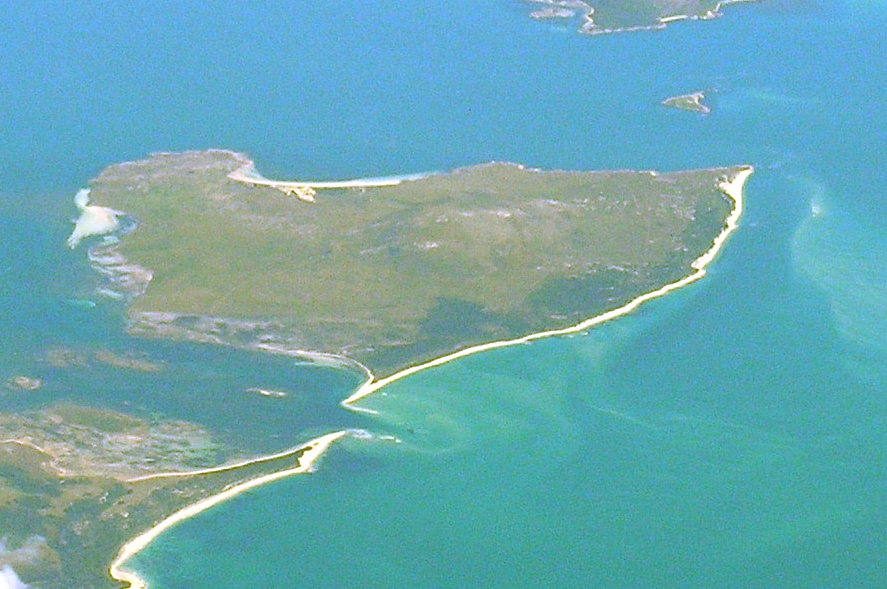
- aerial view of Vansittart Island with Cooties reef as a bright speck below

- Location within Tasmania

Geography
- Location: Bass Strait
- Coordinates: 40°18′S 148°19′E
- Archipelago: Vansittart Island Group
- Area: 0.15 ha (0.37 acres)

Administration
- Australia
- State: Tasmania

Cooties Reef is a narrow islet, with an area of 0.15 ha, in south-eastern Australia. It is part of Tasmania’s Vansittart Island Group, lying in eastern Bass Strait between Flinders and Cape Barren Islands in the Furneaux Group.

== Fauna ==
Pacific gulls breed on the island, and the metallic skink is present. Black-faced cormorants roost on the south side.

== See also ==
- Tucks Reef
