= Isobel Bennett =

Australian marine biologist (1909–2008)

- Born: Isobel Ida Bennett; 9 July 1909; Brisbane
- Died: 12 January 2008 (aged 98); Sydney
- Known for: Marine Science intertidal organisms
- Awards: Mueller Medal (1982); Honorary Doctorate (University of Sydney, 1995)
- Scientific career
- Fields: Marine biology
- Workplaces: University of Sydney

Isobel Ida Bennett AO 1984 (9 July 1909 – 12 January 2008) was one of Australia's best-known marine biologists. She (with Elizabeth Pope) assisted William John Dakin with research for his final book (Australian Seashores) regarded by many as "the definitive guide on the intertidal zone, and a recommended source of information to divers". Following Dakin's death in 1950, she saw the book through to publication in 1952, and she continued to revise and reprint it with a complete revision in 1980 until 1992. In later editions, she was listed as a co-author, then first author. She also wrote nine other books, and was one of the first women (along with Susan Ingham, Mary Gillham & Hope Macpherson) to go south with the Australian National Antarctic Research Expeditions (ANARE).

== Life and career ==
Isobel Ida Bennett was born in Brisbane in 1909 and educated at Somerville House leaving at the age of 16 when her family moved to Sydney. She attended business college and gained employment in a patent office and for four years at the Associated Board of the Royal Schools of Music in Sydney, she joined the Zoology Department of the University of Sydney in 1933. From that time until 1948, she worked as secretary, librarian, demonstrator and research assistant to Professor W.J. Dakin, and then as research assistant to Professor P.D.F. Murray.

From 1950 she regularly led students to the Heron Island and Lizard Island Research Stations on the Great Barrier Reef and did field work on the Victorian and Tasmanian coasts. In 1959 she made her first visit to Macquarie Island with the ANARE relief ship, returning in 1960, 1965 and 1968. From 1959 to 1971, she was a Professional Officer at the University of Sydney, and received the first Honorary Master of Science from the University of Sydney in 1962. She was a temporary Associate Professor at Stanford University in 1963 and a delegate to the 11th Pacific Science Congress in Tokyo in 1966.

She retired in 1971, but remained an active author and researcher. From 1974 to 1979 she worked with the New South Wales Fisheries Department, and during that time, carried out fieldwork and surveys at the coastal rock platforms at Jervis Bay and Ulladulla, and on the coasts of Lord Howe Island, Norfolk Island and Flinders Island.

In 1982 she was awarded the Mueller Medal by the Australian and New Zealand Association for the Advancement of Science.

Bennett died in Sydney at the age of 98. Her papers and a collection of around 500 colour slides covering the last edition of Australian Seashores have been donated to the National Library of Australia and around 400 remaining slides.

She had one genus and five species of marine organisms (three being from the Great Barrier Reef) and a coral reef named for her.
