= Tucks Reef =

Place in Bass Strait, Australia

Coordinates: 40°15′S 148°14′E

Tucks Reef is a small rocky island, with an area of 1.14 ha, in south-eastern Australia. It is part of Tasmania’s Vansittart Island Group, lying in eastern Bass Strait between Flinders and Cape Barren Islands in the Furneaux Group.

== Fauna ==
Recorded breeding seabird and wader species are little penguin, white-faced storm-petrel, silver gull, pied oystercatcher and sooty oystercatcher.

== See also ==
- Cooties Reef
