= Johannes Cornelis Wienecke =

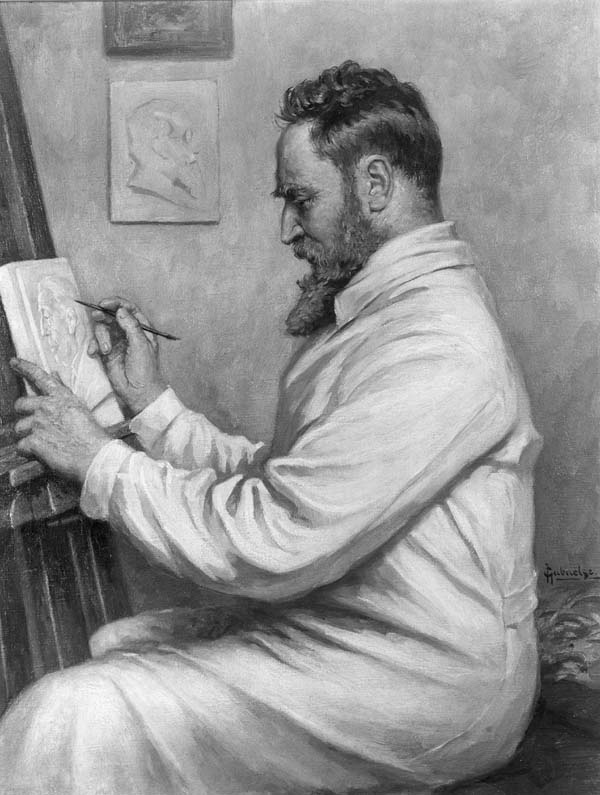
Portrait of Johannes Cornelis Wienecke by Johannes Gabriëlse

Johannes Cornelis Wienecke (Heiligenstadt, 24 March 1872 - Apeldoorn, 11 August 1945) was a Dutch medallist. He designed the 4th portrait of queen Wilhelmina used on Dutch coins between 1921 and 1945. He worked many years in Zeist. In 1922 he also designed the logo of the Permanent Court of International Justice, which continues to be used today by the International Court of Justice.

== Works ==
Coin-portrait of Queen Wilhelmina, used between 1921 and 1945

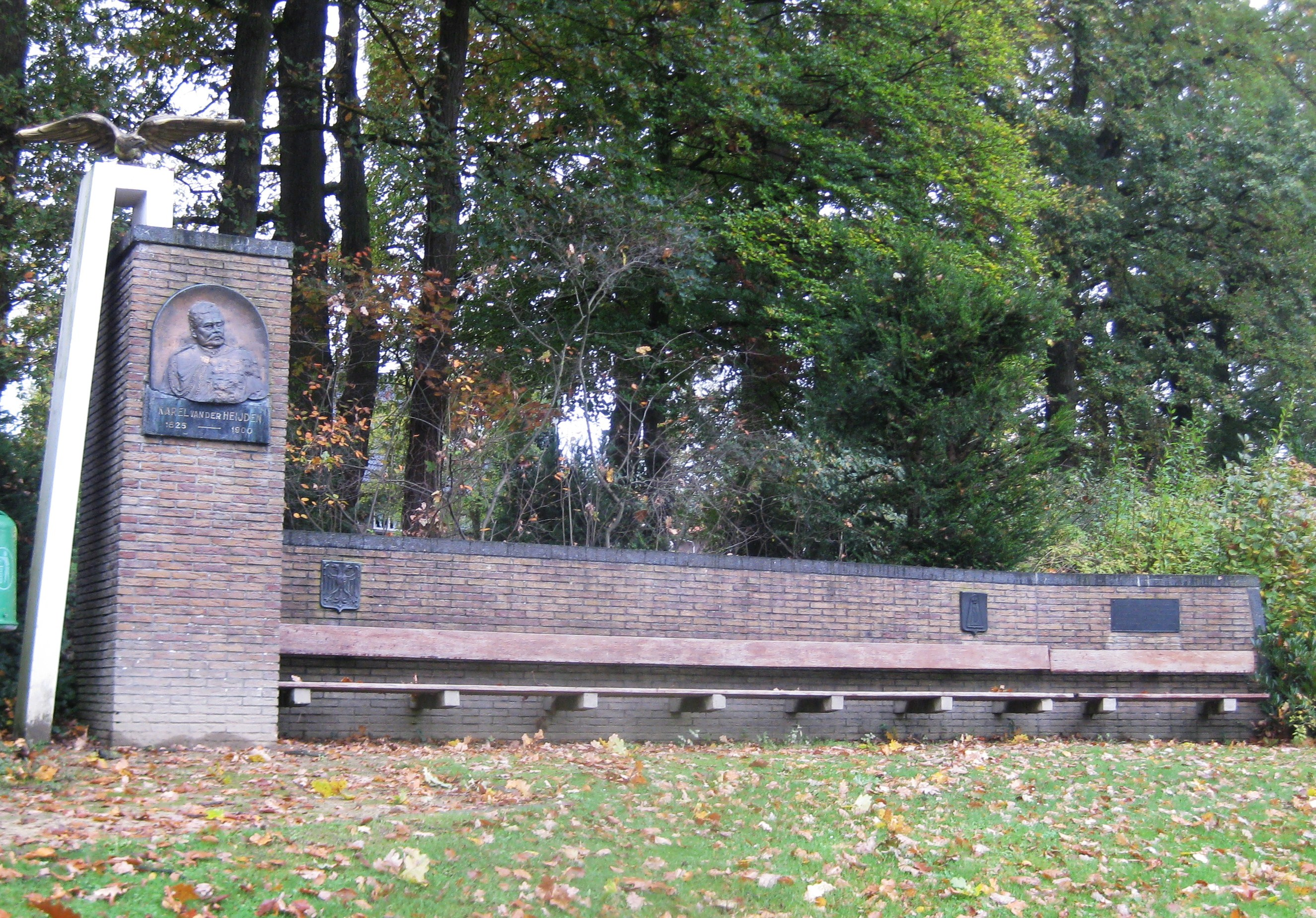
Karel van der Heijden bench (Bronbeek)

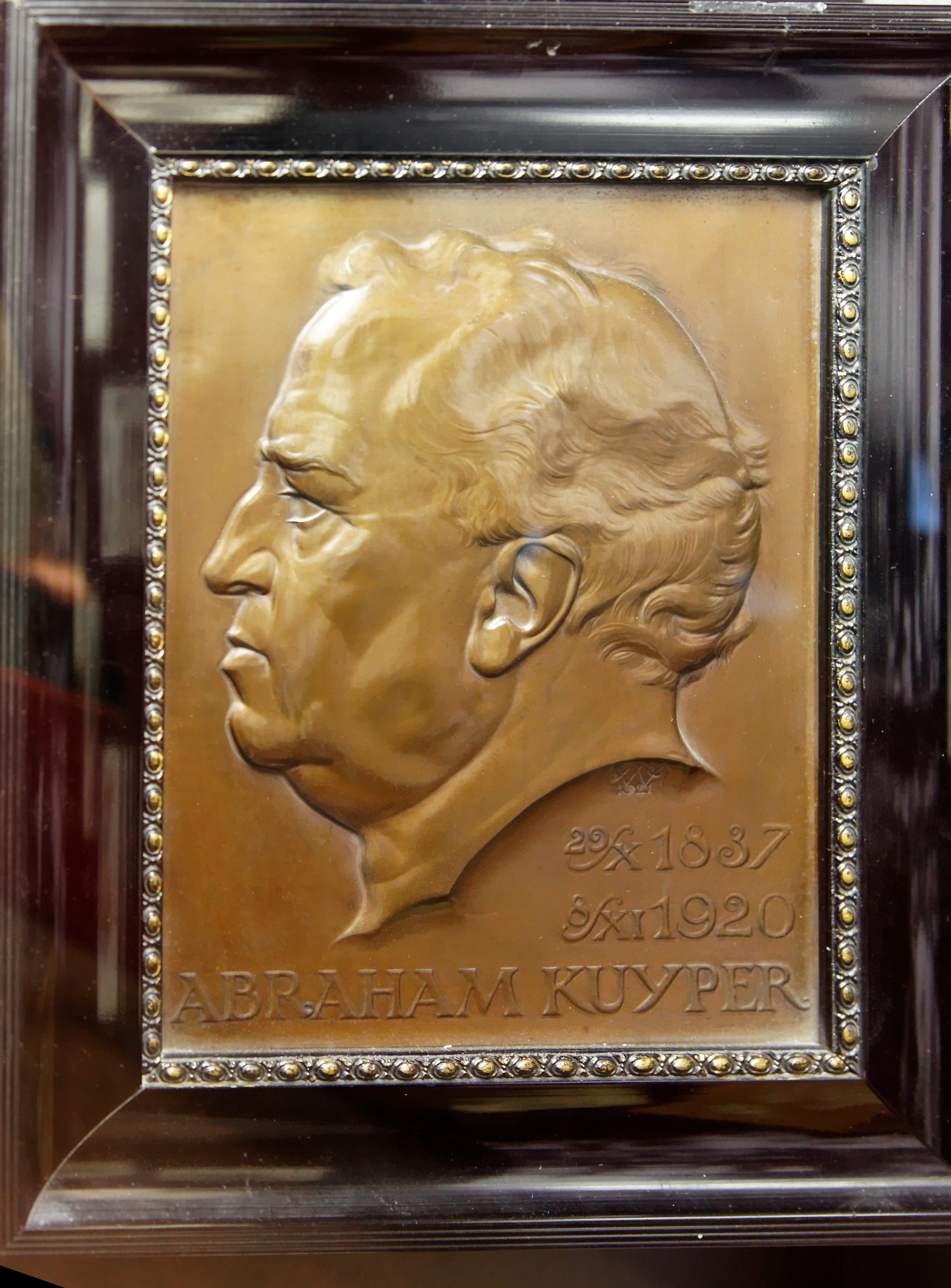
Abraham Kuyper Plaque

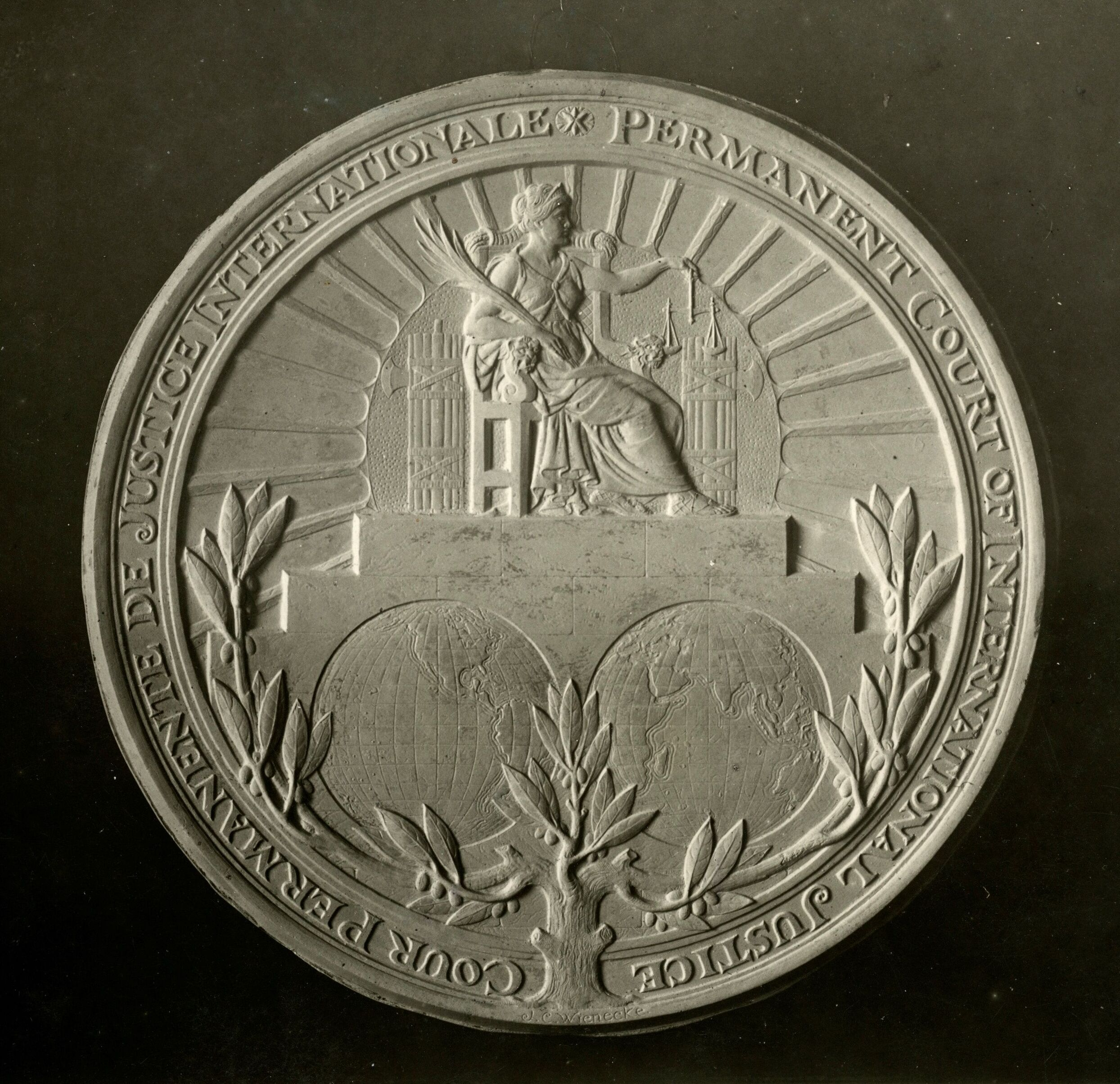
Permanent Court of International Justice Logo

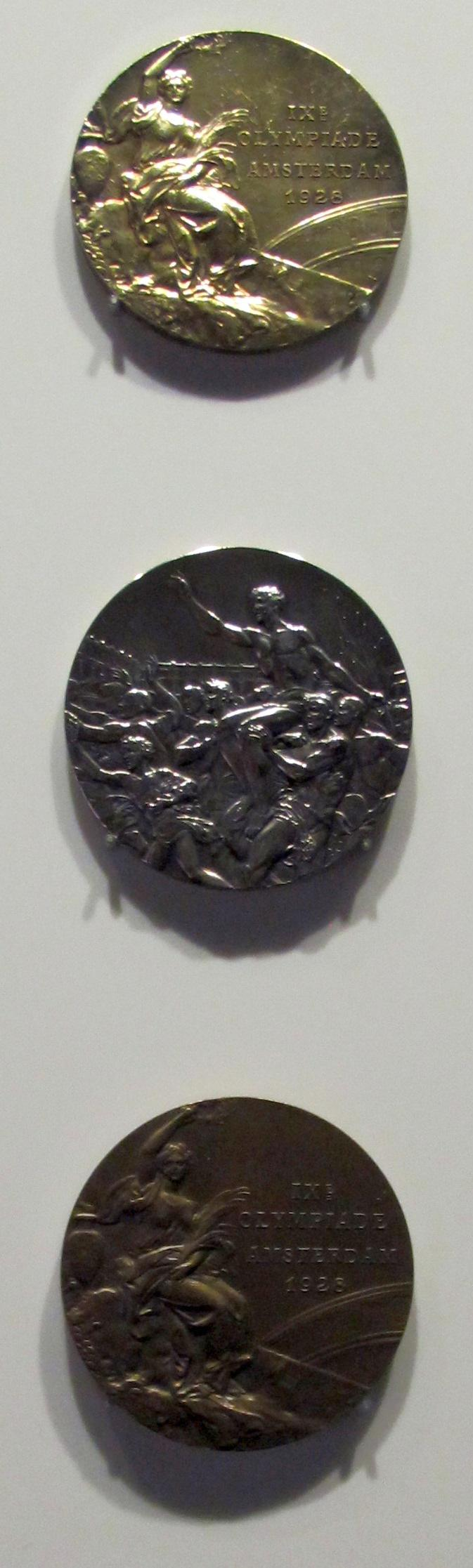
Olympic Games Medals - 1928
