= Australian Antarctic Division =

Division of the Australian government

Agency overview
- Formed: 1948
- Jurisdiction: Australia
- Headquarters: Kingston, Hobart, Tasmania; 42°59′12.43″S 147°17′32.28″E
- Employees: 300 (as at 15 June 2022)
- Minister responsible: Murray Watt MP, Minister for the Environment & Water
- Agency executive: Emma Campbell, Director of the Australian Antarctic Division
- Parent department: Department of Climate Change, Energy, the Environment & Water
- Website: www.antarctica.gov.au

The Australian Antarctic Division (AAD) is a division of the Department of Climate Change, Energy, the Environment & Water. The division undertakes science programs and research projects to contribute to an understanding of Antarctica and the Southern Ocean. It conducts and supports collaborative research programs with other Australian and international organisations, such as the Bureau of Meteorology and Geoscience Australia, as well as administering and maintaining a presence in Australian Antarctic and sub-Antarctic territories.

Their website includes articles on the Antarctic wildlife, threats, guidelines and they have blogs written by Australians at the three Australian bases in Antarctica: Mawson, Davis and Casey.

== Charter ==
Under its charter the Australian Antarctic Division:

- Administers the Australian Antarctic Territory and the Territory of Heard Island and McDonald Islands
- Conducts research in high priority areas of Antarctic science
- Coordinates and manages Australia's logistic program in Antarctica
- Promotes Antarctic research in universities through grants and the provision of logistic support
- Develops policy proposals and provides advice on Australia's Antarctic interests
- Promotes Australia's Antarctic interests within the Antarctic Treaty System
- Maintains a continuing presence in the region through permanent stations, the establishment of field bases and the provision of transport, communication and medical services
- Acts as the primary source of Australian Antarctic information

== Australian Antarctic Program ==
The Australian Antarctic Division leads the Australian Antarctic Program (AAP) with four key goals:

- Maintain the Antarctic Treaty System and enhance Australia's influence in it
- Protect the Antarctic environment
- Understand the role of Antarctica in the global climate system
- Undertake scientific work of practical, economic and national significance

== Research stations ==
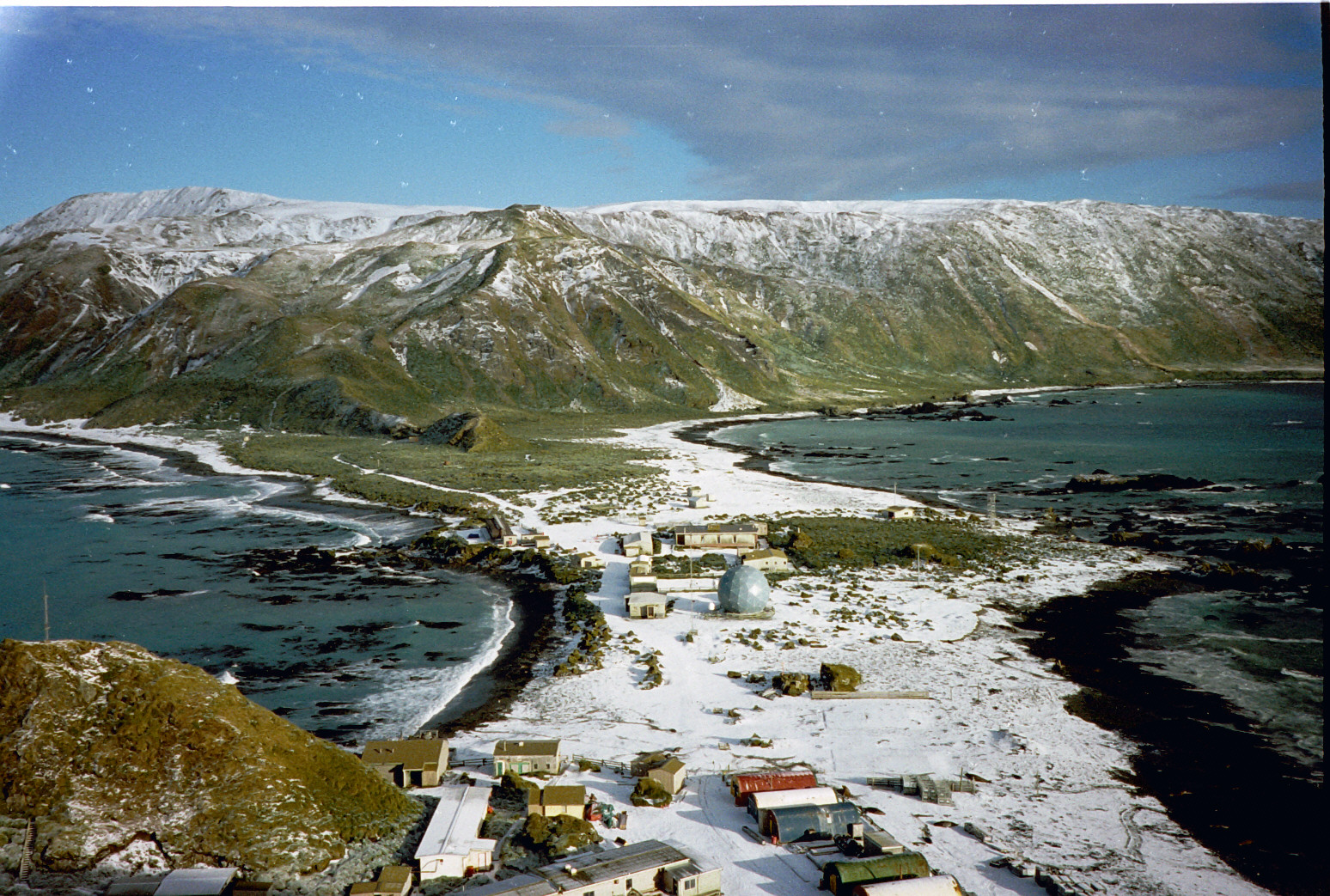
Macquarie Island station in 1996

The AAD headquarters is in Kingston, Tasmania, just south of Hobart. The division's headquarters houses laboratories for science, electronics and electron microscopy, mechanical and instrument workshops, a krill research aquarium, a herbarium, equipment stores, communications and other operational and support facilities. The Chief Scientist since 2021 has been Professor Nicole Webster.

The AAD maintains three permanently staffed stations on the Antarctic continent, and one on Macquarie Island in the subantarctic.

- Casey Station (including the seasonal camp at Wilkins Runway)
- Davis Station
- Mawson Station
- Macquarie Island Station

Remote field bases operate during the summer research season supporting coastal, inland and traverse operations.

== Transport ==
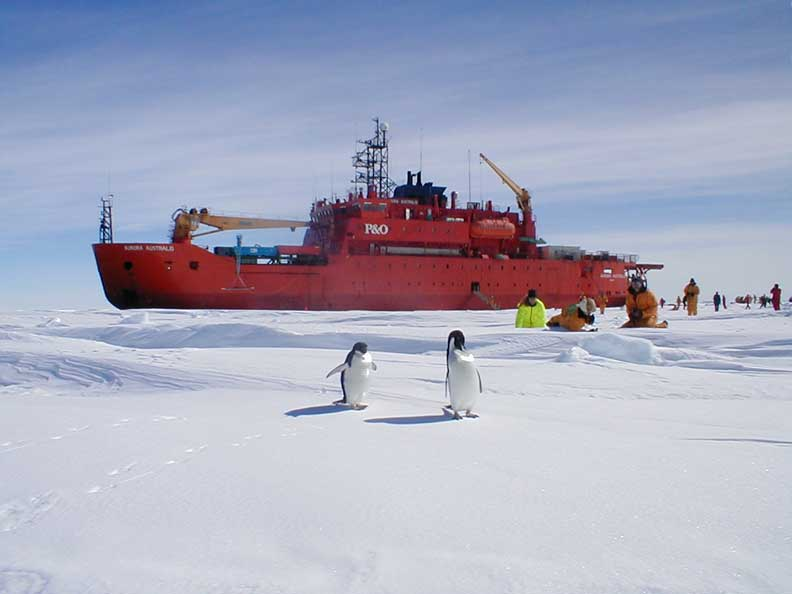
Researchers studying penguins while voyaging aboard the Aurora Australis

=== Aviation ===
The AAD uses an air transport system, both for transport to and from Antarctica, and for transport within the continent. Aircraft for this system are provided and operated under contract by private sector operators. Services to and from Antarctica are provided, between November and February each year, by an Airbus A319-115LR operated by Skytraders. This aircraft operates to and from the Wilkins ice runway, situated some 65 kilometres (40 mi) from Casey Station. Construction of a 2,700 m (8,900 ft) paved runway at Davis station was announced in 2018.

Services within Antarctica are provided by a mixture of fixed-wing aircraft and helicopters. Fixed-wing services are provided by Basler BT-67 and DHC-6 Twin Otter aircraft operated by Kenn Borek Air. These aircraft operate from Wilkins runway and from smaller snow runways at each of the three permanent stations, as well as any field locations which provide the necessary flat area of snow or ice.

Helicopter services are provided by up to four BK117 helicopters, operated by Helicopter Resources. In 2016, AAD helicopter pilot David Wood died by falling into a crevasse while unloading sling cargo near Davis Station. Following legal proceedings, the Court of the Australian Capital Territory found the AAD guilty of failing to comply with its duty to ensure the health and safety of workers.

The Antarctic Flight RAAF operated from 1948 to 1963. Since its withdrawal, aircraft from the Royal Australian Air Force operated infrequently in the Antarctic and sub-Antarctic islands in the 1970s and 1980s, Since 2016, RAAF C-17A Globemasters operate as required to carry high priority or oversize cargo that cannot be carried by the A319. Through "Operation Southern Discovery", elements of the Australian Defence Force are tasked to provide annual support for the Australian Antarctic Division and the Australian Antarctic Program (AAP) in regional scientific, environmental and economic activities.

=== Shipping ===
The AAD uses the icebreaker RSV Nuyina, an icebreaking research and supply vessel. Construction commenced in May 2017 at Damen Shipyards in Romania. The vessel was then fitted out at Vlissingen in the Netherlands and handed over on 19 August 2021. Nuyina is owned by the Australian Government, and operated by Serco.

Nuyina was built to replace RSV Aurora Australis, a multi-purpose marine research and resupply ship chartered from P&O Polar. Aurora Australis was launched in 1989 and built by Carrington Slipways in Newcastle, New South Wales, and decommissioned in March 2020.

Due to mechanical problems, Nuyina was unable to be used during the 2022-23 Antarctic season and other chartered vessels were used instead, including MPOV Aiviq and the ice-strengthened cargo ship MV Happy Diamond.

=== Dog sleds ===
Australia was one of the three countries still using sled dogs (husky) in 1992 when the Protocol on Environmental Protection to the Antarctic Treaty (the Madrid Protocol) banned the presence of non-native species in Antarctica to avoid the transmission of diseases from non-native species to native species. The younger Australian huskies were relocated using helicopter, ship, aeroplane and truck to Ely, Minnesota, where they could continue to be working dogs. The older dogs were retired to Australia, often living with former Antarctic workers.

== Territorial administration ==
The AAD is responsible, on behalf of the Australian Government, for administering the two Australian federal territories that lie in Antarctic or sub-Antarctic latitudes:

- Australian Antarctic Territory
- Heard Island and McDonald Islands

The AAD maintains a base on Macquarie Island which is part of the Australian state of Tasmania.

== Publications ==
AAD produced the Australian Antarctic Magazine produced twice a year (June and December) in hardcopy and online between 2001 and June 2020.

The magazine has been replaced by an interactive feature series called Explore Antarctica. AAD also produces an online newsletter Antarctic Insider.
