= List of research vessels by country =

Research vessels by country include:

== Algeria ==
- RV Belkacem Grine (2010)

== Angola ==
- RV Baía Farta
- Pensador

== Argentina ==
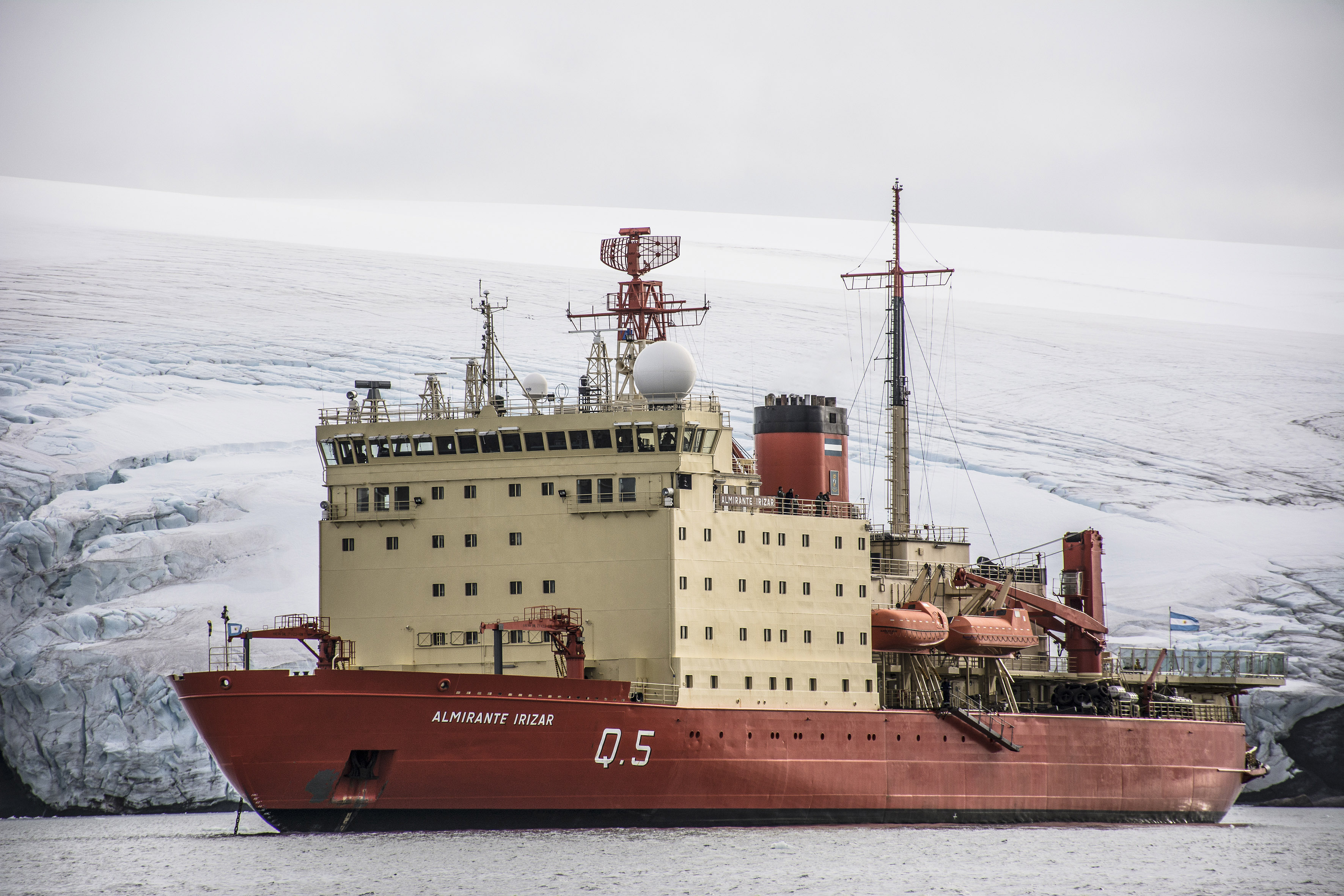
ARA Almirante Irízar

- ARA Almirante Irízar
- ARA Puerto Deseado
- ARA Comodoro Rivadavia
- ARA Austral
- ARA Cormorán

== Australia ==
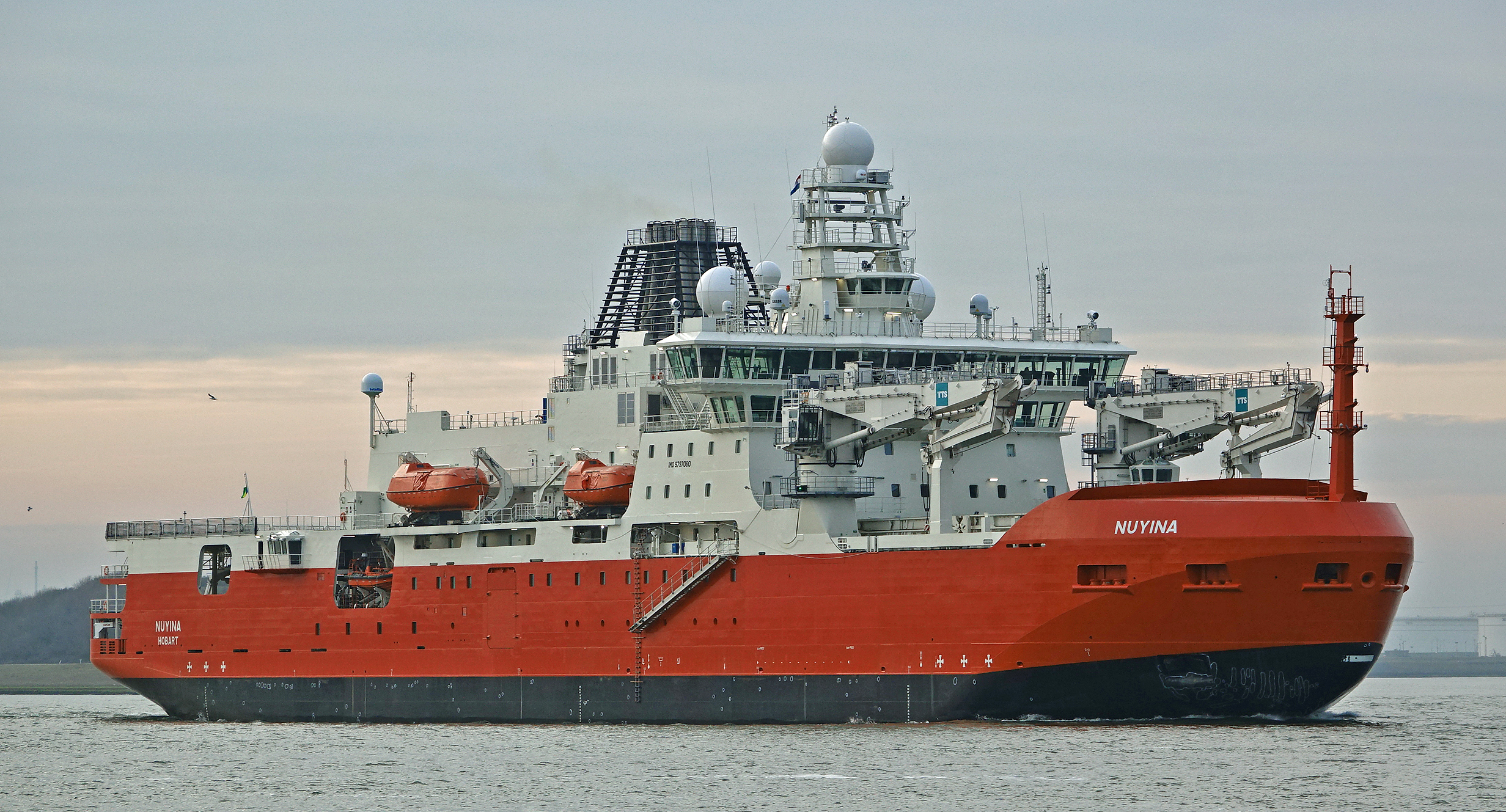
RSV Nuyina

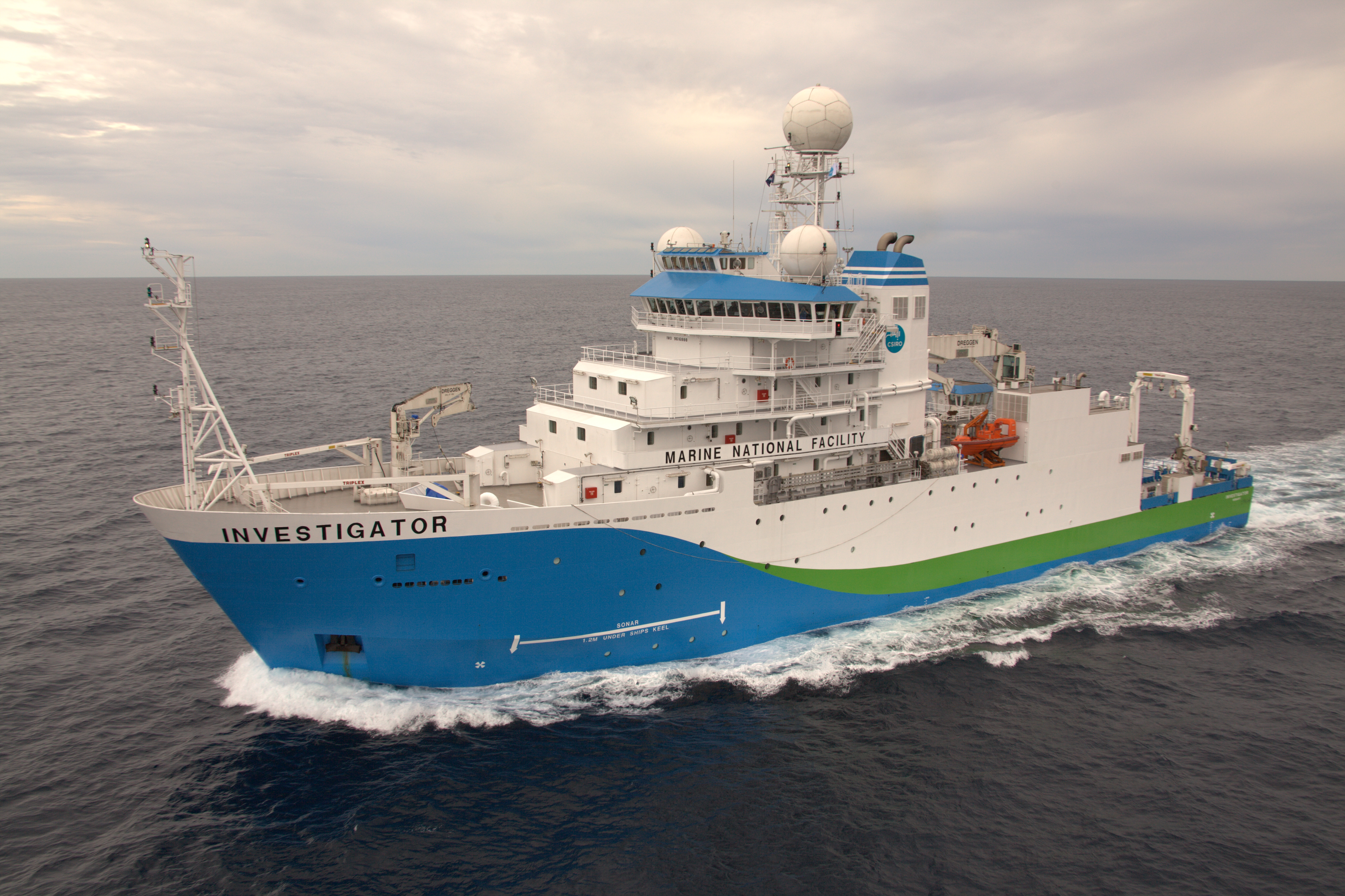
RV Investigator

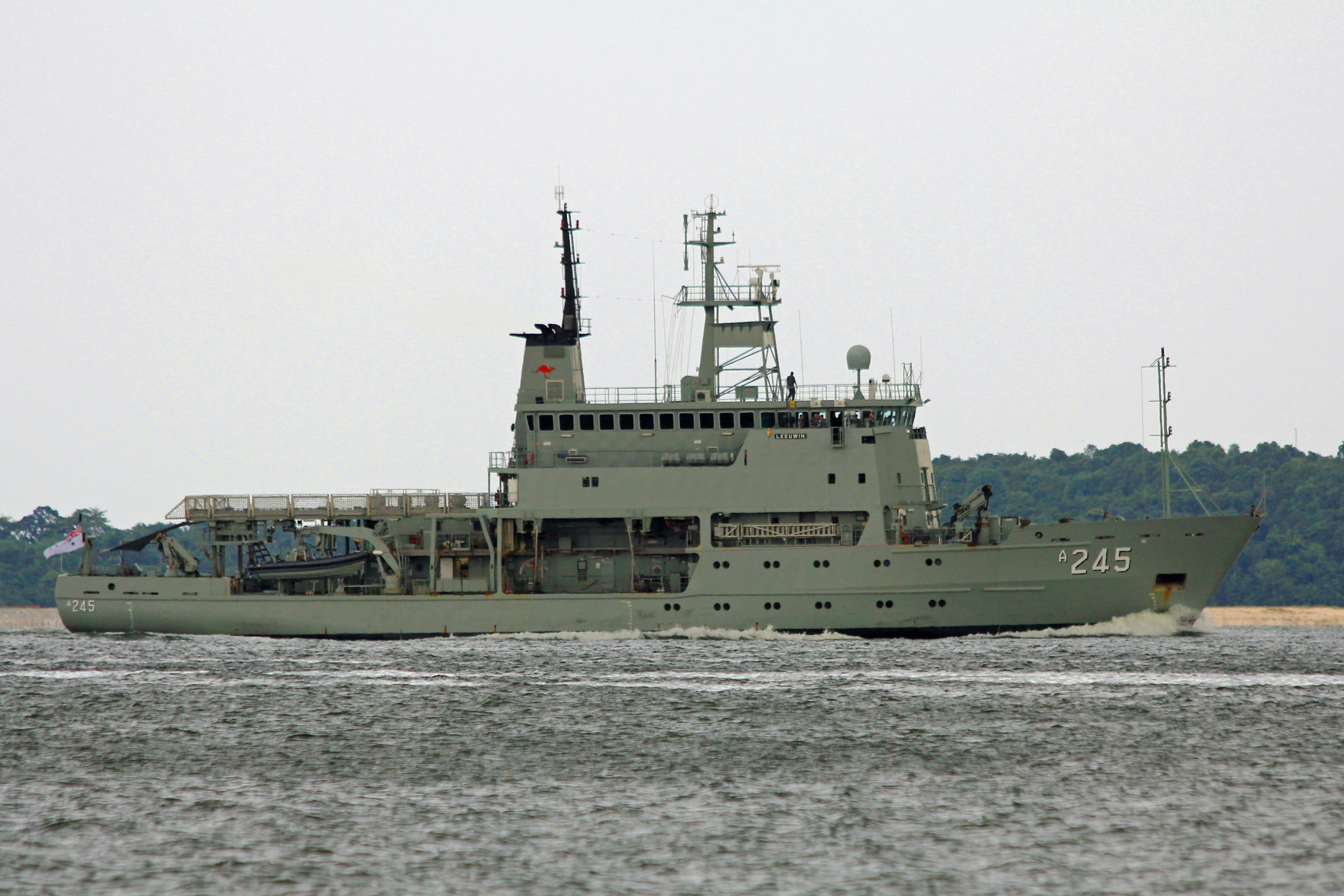
HMAS Leeuwin (A 245)

- RSV Nuyina
- Aurora Australis
- RV Franklin
- RV Investigator
- HMAS Cook (1973-1998)
- Nella Dan
- Southern Surveyor
- RV Solander
- RV Cape Ferguson

=== Survey vessels ===
- HMAS Barcoo (K375) (1946-1964)
- HMAS Benalla (J323) (1943-1945)
- HMAS Benalla (A 04) (1990)
- HMAS Bungaree (1944)
- HMAS Diamantina (K377) (1959-1980)
- HMS Fantome (1906-1914)
- HMAS Flinders (1981-1990)
- HMAS Gascoyne (K354) (1959-1966)
- HMAS Kookaburra (1956-1958)
- HMAS Horsham (1944-1956)
- HMAS Leeuwin (A 245) (2000)
- HMAS Melville (A 246) (2000)
- HMAS Mermaid (A 02) (1989)
- HMAS Moresby (1918) (1933-1934, 1935-1946)
- HMAS Moresby (1963) (1964-1999)
- HMAS Paluma (A 01) (1989)
- HMAS Shepparton (J248) (1943-1946)
- HMAS Shepparton (A 03) (1990)
- HMAS Warreen (1952-1966)

== Bangladesh ==
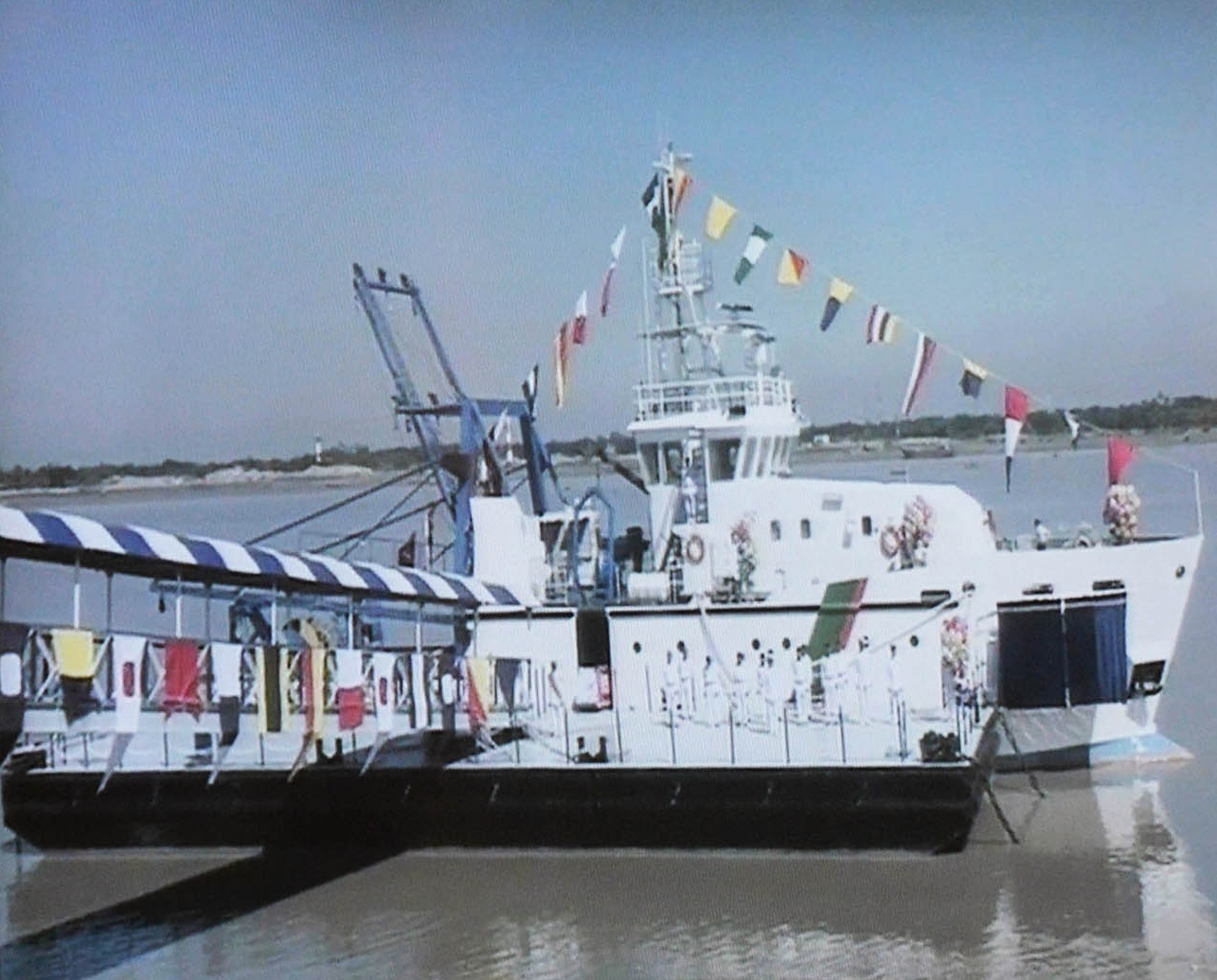
RV Meen Shandhani in 2016

- RV Meen Shandhani (2016)
- CVASU Research Vessel

== Belgium (EU) ==
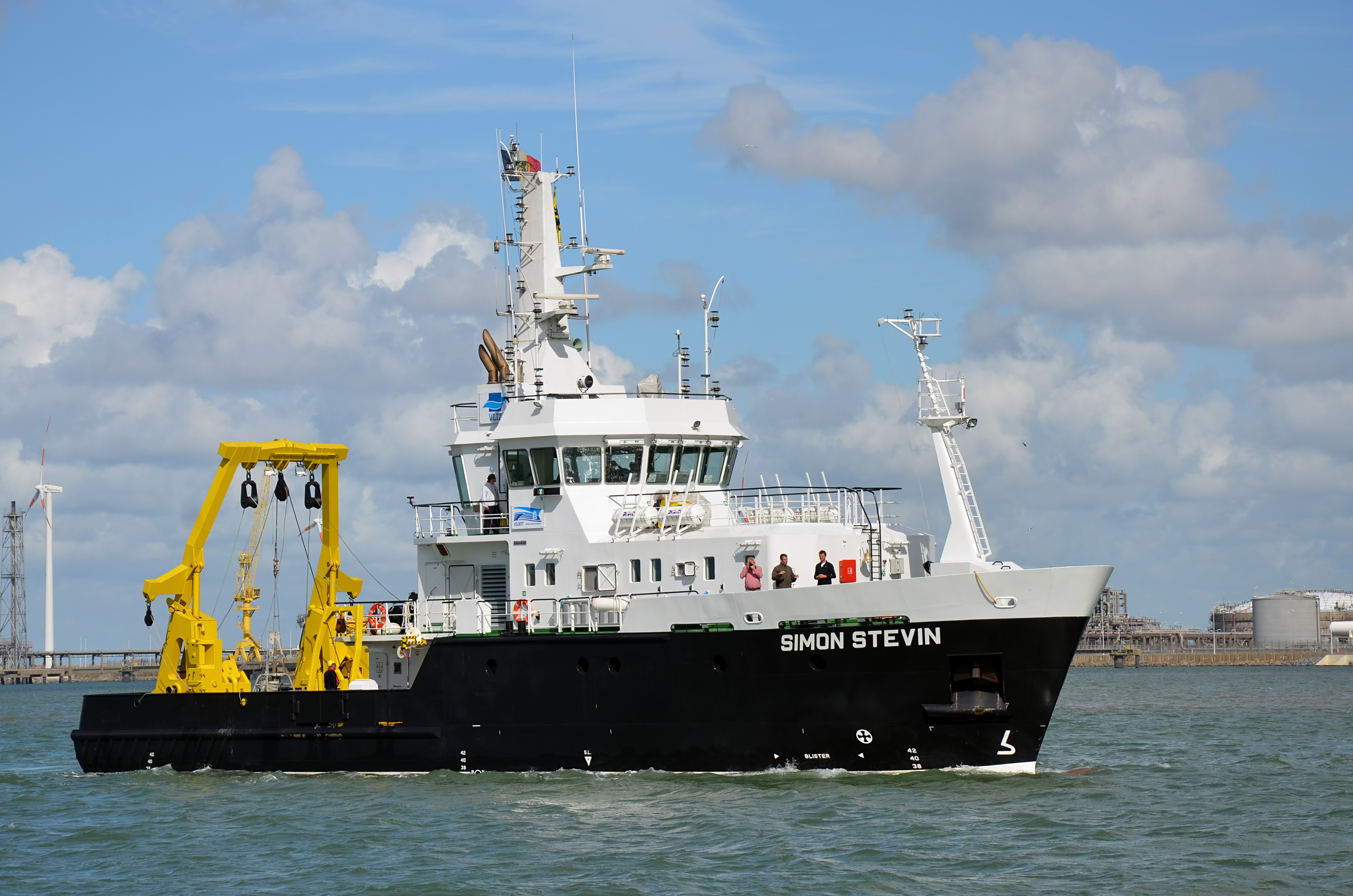
RV Simon Stevin

- RV Belgica (transferred to Ukraine, now RV Borys Aleksandrov)
- RV Zeeleeuw
- RV Simon Stevin

== Bermuda ==
- RV Atlantic Explorer

== Brazil ==
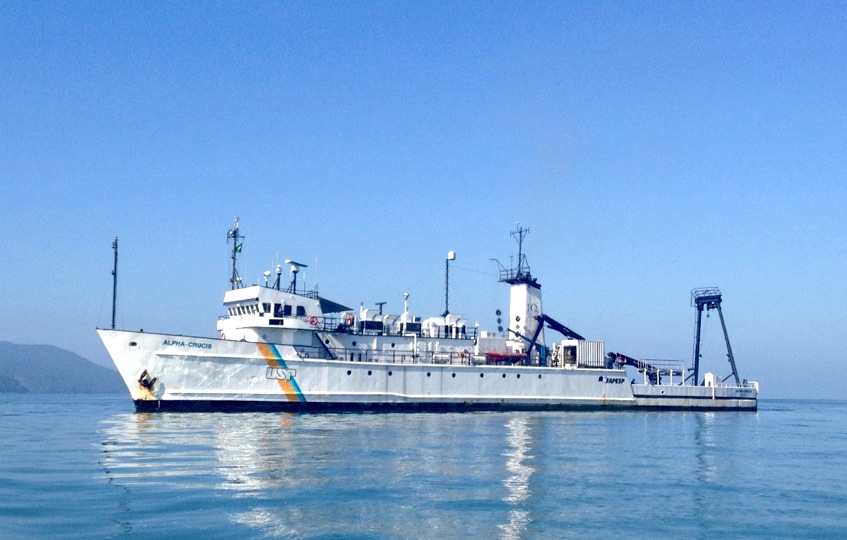
RV Alpha Crucis

- RV Professor W. Besnard (1967-2008)
- RV Atlântico Sul (1973)
- RV Alpha Crucis (2012)
- BNS H21 Sirius
- BNS H35 Amorim do Valle
- BNS H36 Taurus
- BNS H37 Garnier Sampaio
- BNS H38 Cruzeiro do Sul
- BNS H40 Antares

== Bulgaria (EU) ==
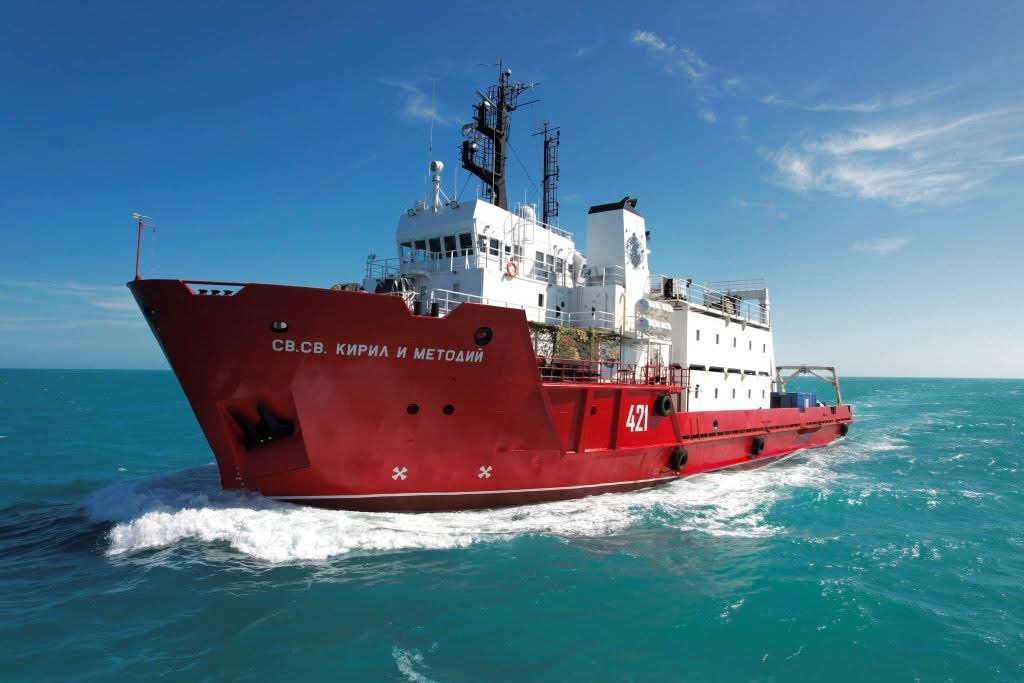
Sv. Sv. Kiril i Metodii RSV 421

- Akademik
- Sv. Sv. Kiril i Metodii

== Canada ==
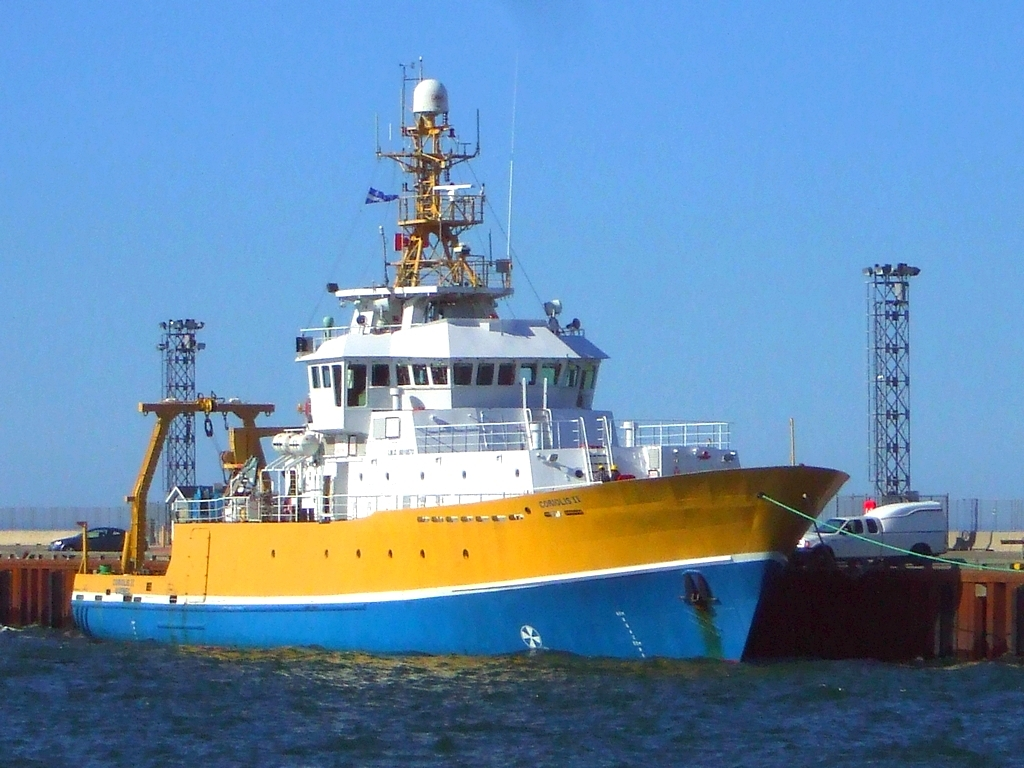
RV Coriolis II

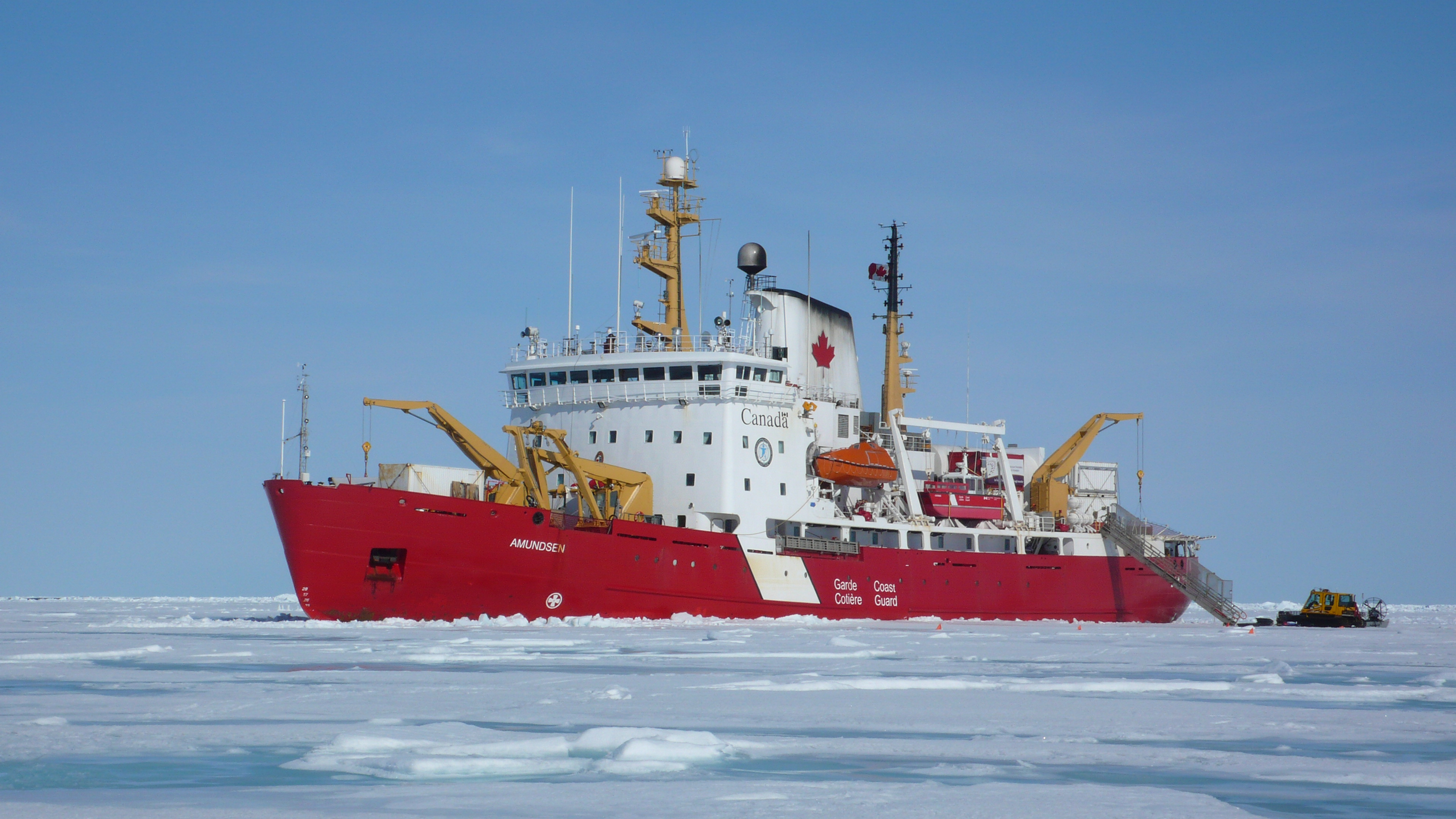
CCGS Amundsen

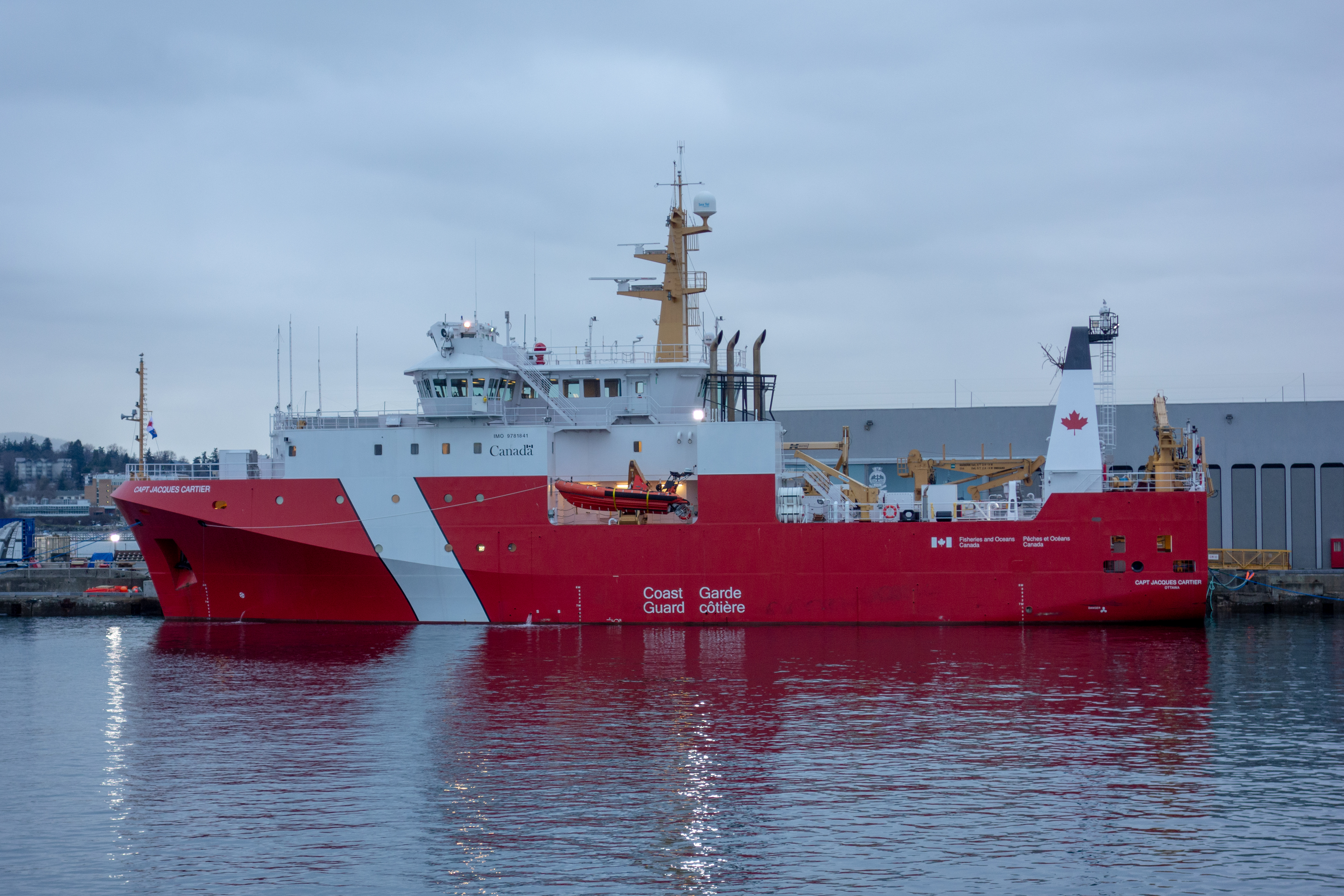
CCGS Capt. Jacques Cartier

- RV Coriolis II

=== Canadian Coast Guard ===
- CCGS Amundsen
- CCGS Frederick G. Creed
- CCGS Hudson
- CCGS Limnos
- CCGS Alfred Needler
- CCGS Teleost
- CCGS John P. Tully
- CCGS Vector
- CCGS Capt. Jacques Cartier
- CCGS John Cabot (2020)
- CCGS Sir John Franklin

=== Parks Canada ===
- RV David Thompson (1992)
- Gwaii Haanas II

=== University of Victoria ===
- RV John Strickland

=== Government of Nunavut ===
- MV Nuliajuk

=== Qikiqtaaluk Corporation ===
- RV Celtic Voyager (bought from Ireland in 2023)
- RV Ludy Pudluk (2021)

=== Survey vessels ===
- HMCS Acadia (1919-1923, 1925-1939, 1945-1969)
- HMCS Cartier (1919-1939)
- HMCS Cedarwood (1948-1958)

== Cape Verde ==
- RV Islândia (donated by Iceland in 1994)

== Chile ==
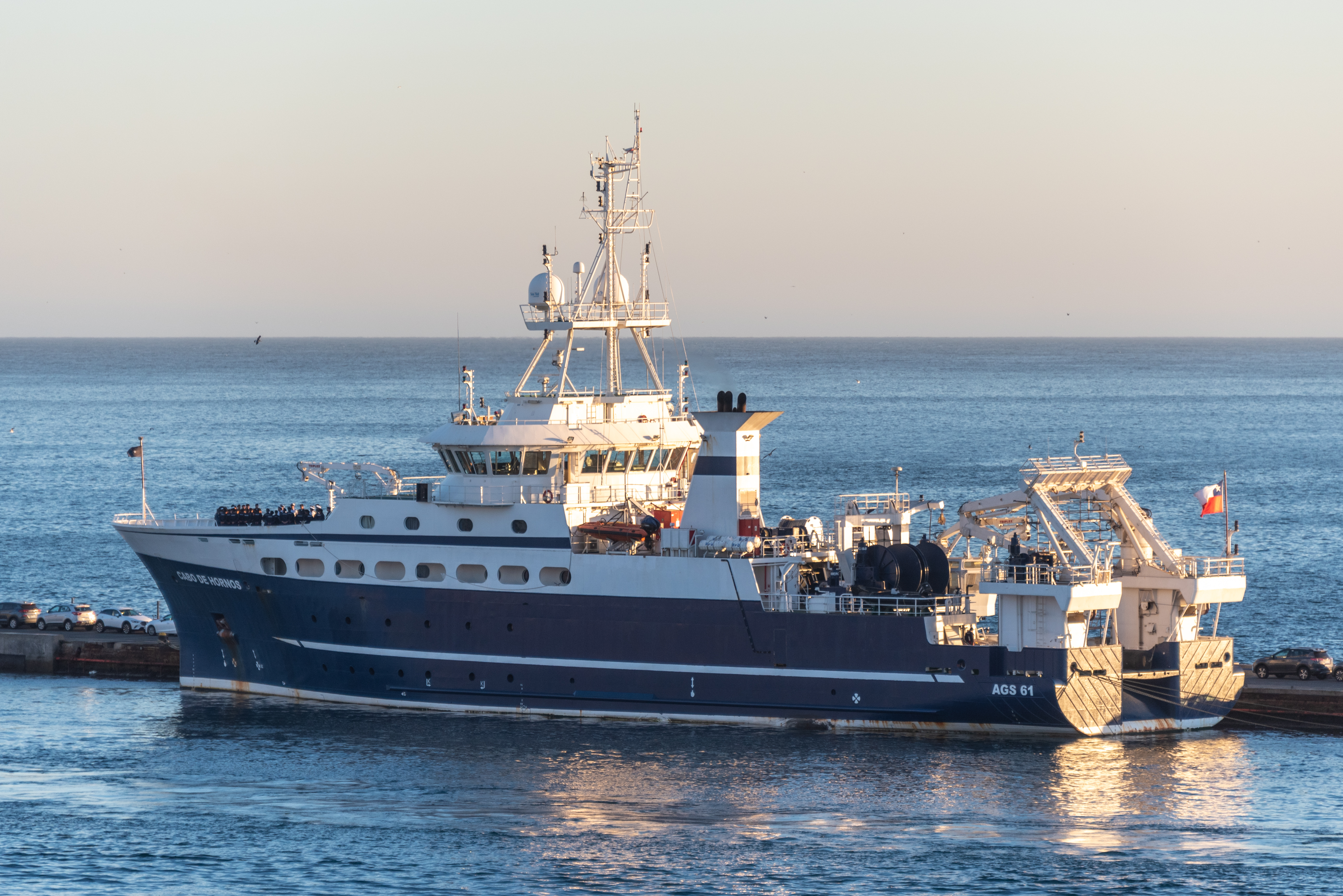
CNS Cabo de Hornos

- Cabo de Hornos AGS 61

== China ==
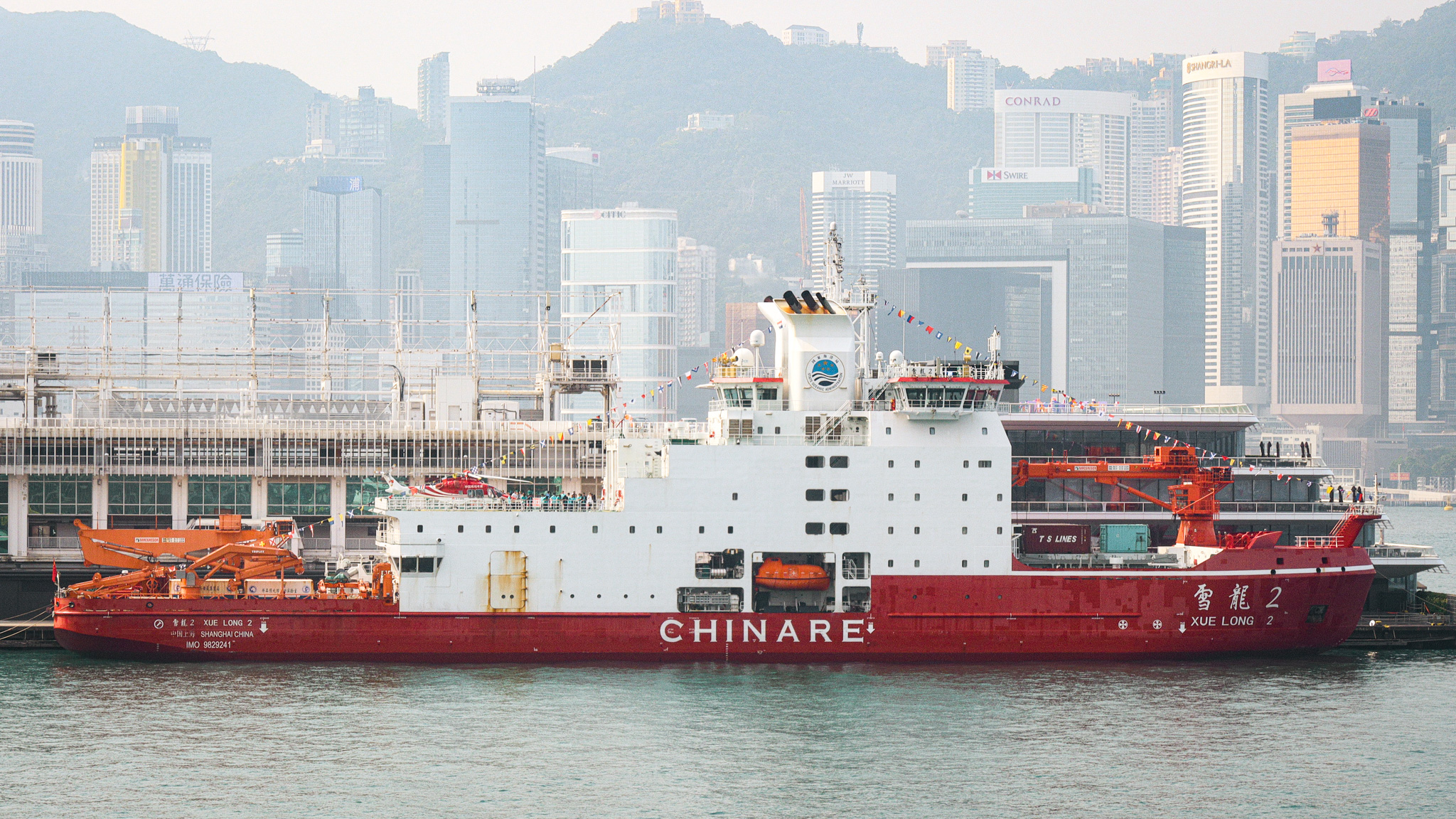
Xue Long 2

- Xue Long
- Xue Long 2
- Ji Di
- Tan Suo San Hao
- Zhong Shan Da Xue Ji Di
- Type 625 research vessel

== Colombia ==
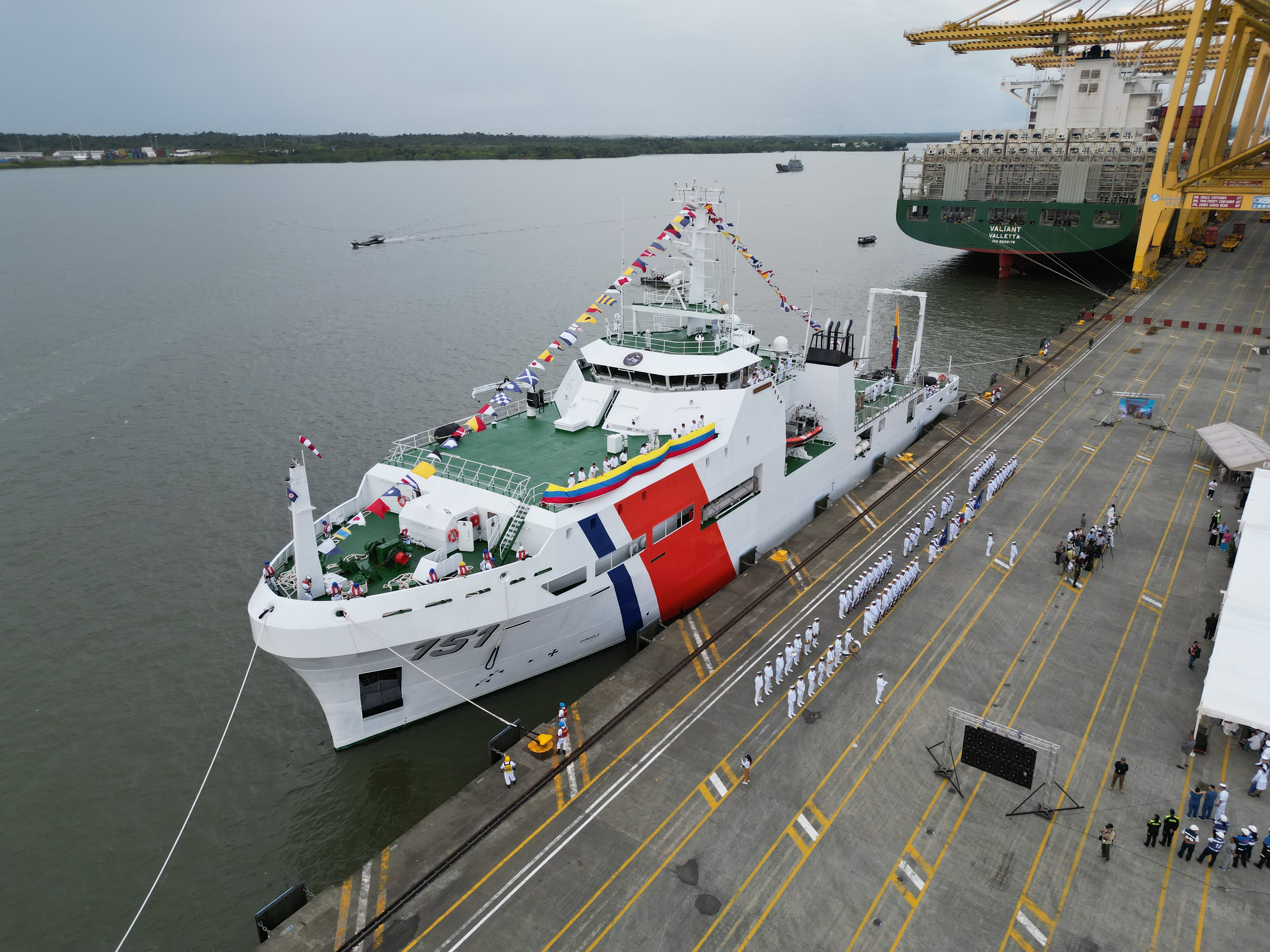
ARC Simón Bolívar

- ARC Providencia
- ARC Malpelo
- ARC Quindio
- ARC Caribe
- ARC Roncador
- ARC Simon Bolivar
- BI Ancón

== Cook Islands ==
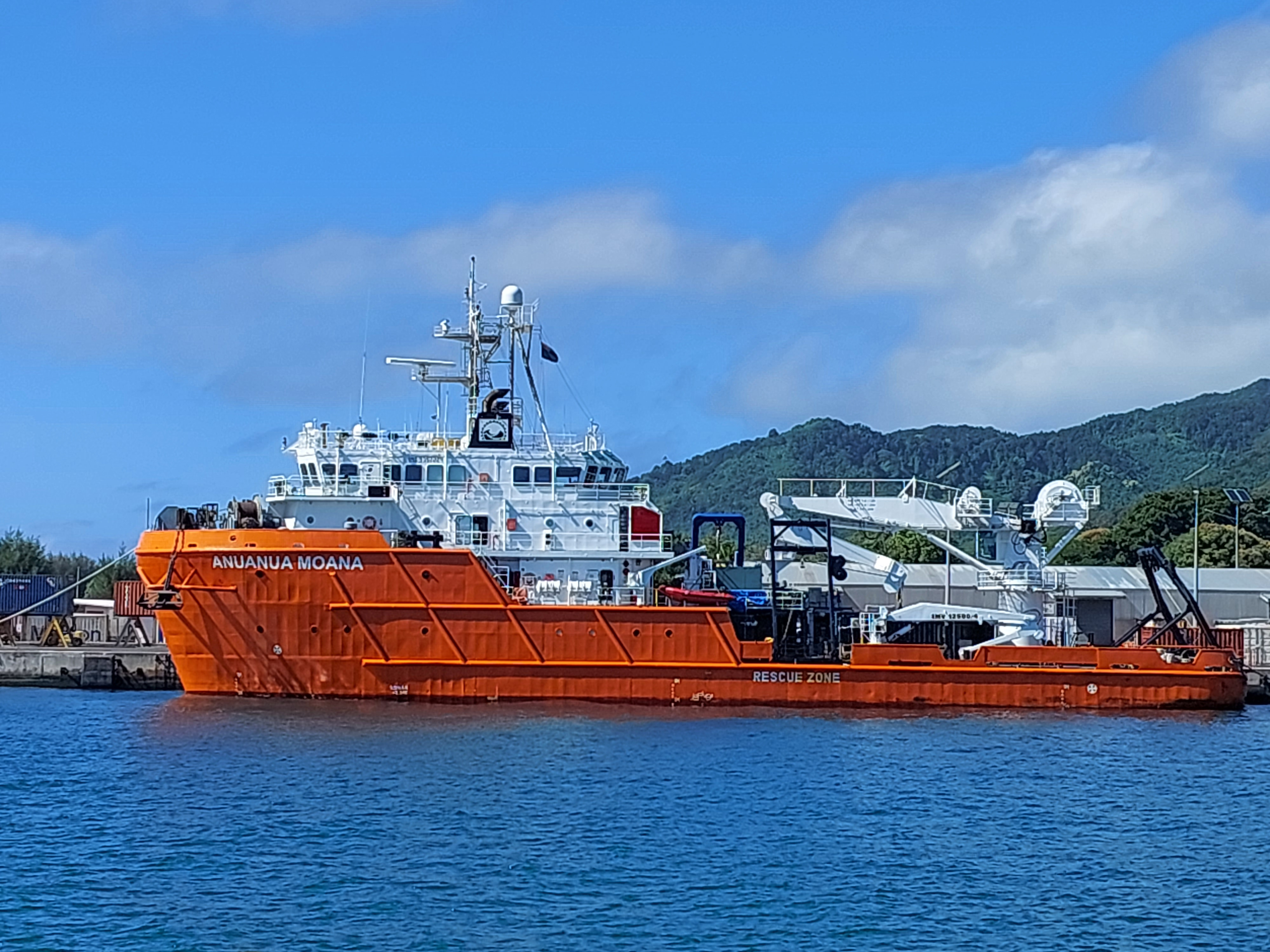
Anuanua Moana

- Anuanua Moana (2023)

== Croatia (EU) ==
- RV BIOS DVA

=== Survey vessels ===
- SV Hidra
- SV Palagruža

== Czechia (EU) ==
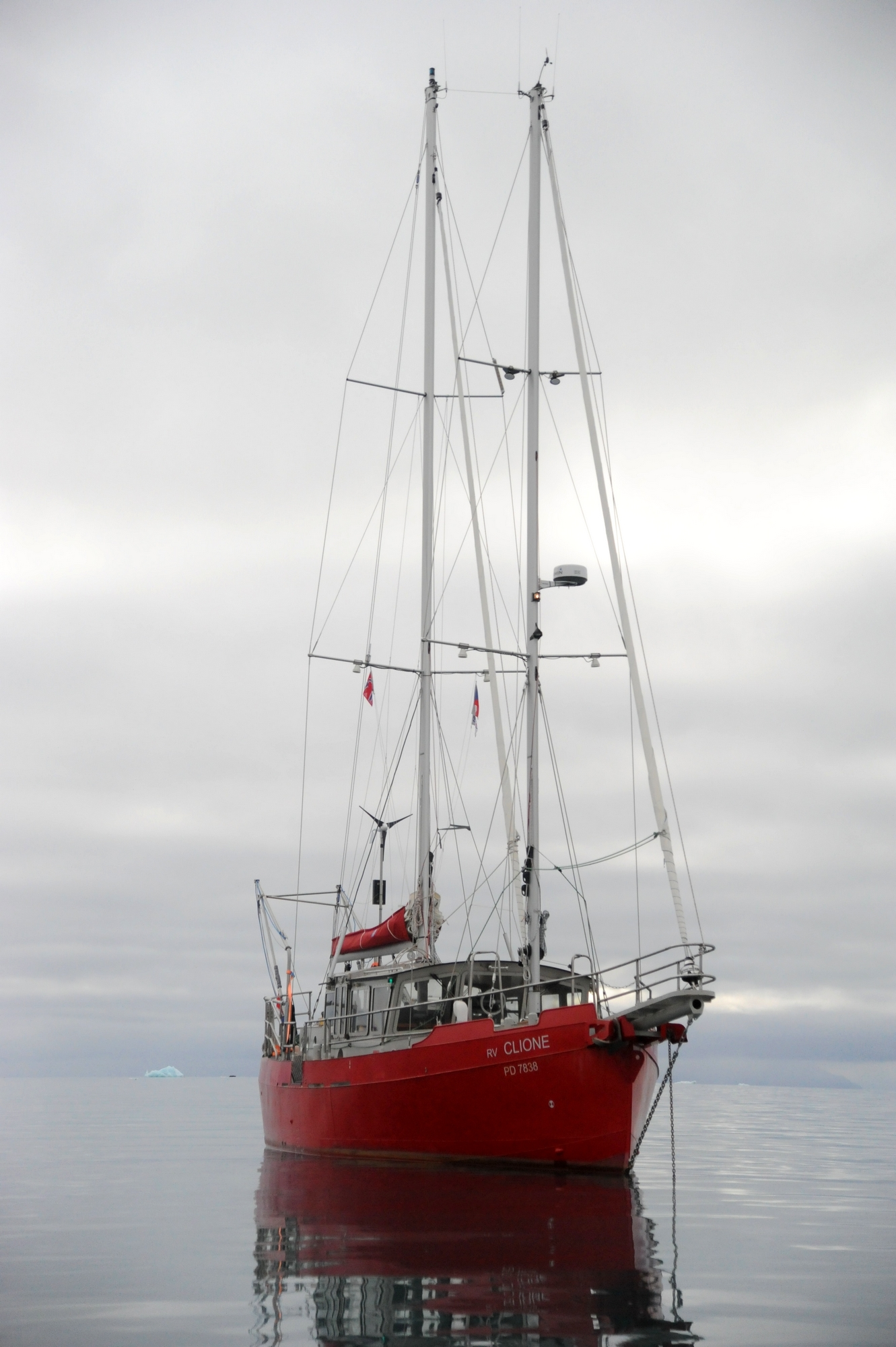
RV Clione

=== University of South Bohemia ===
- RV Clione

=== Czech Academy of Sciences ===
- Ota Oliva
- Thor Heyerdahl (2009)

== Denmark (EU) ==
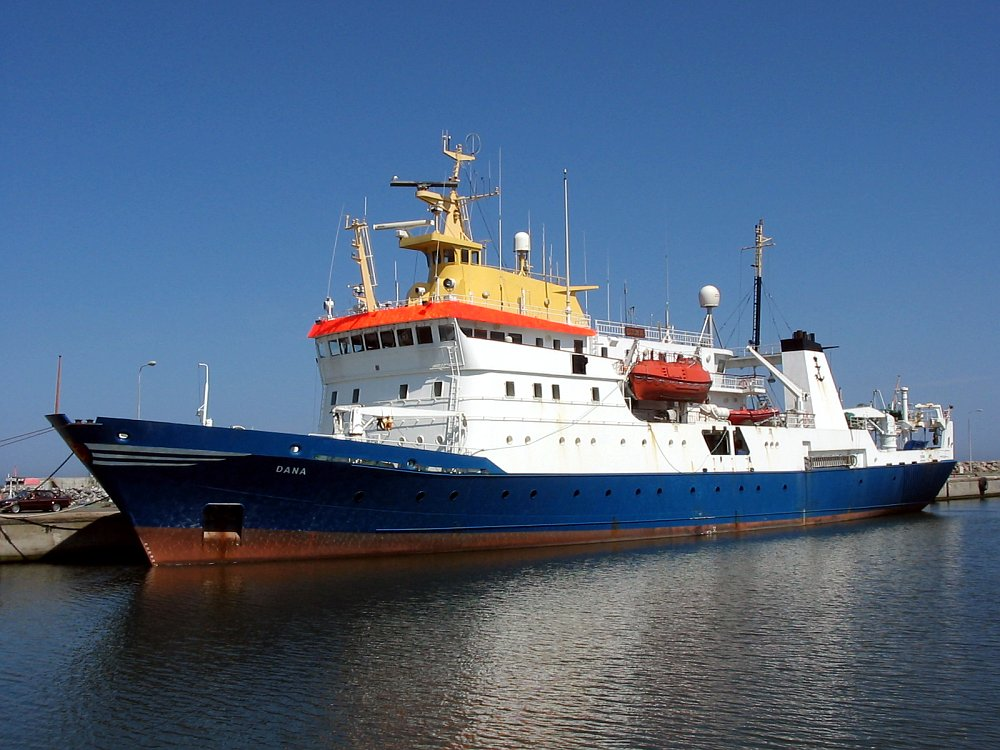
Dana (IV)

See also List of Danish research ships, which includes ships used only for expeditions

- Aurora (2014)
- Biologen (1932-1964)
- Dana I (1920-1922)
- Dana II (1921-1935)
- Dana III (1937-1980)
- Dana IV (1981)
- Dana V (expected in 2027)
- Sallingsund (1899-1932)
- Thor (1902-1919)

=== Faroe Islands ===
- RV Jákup Sverri (2020)

=== Greenland ===
- RV Sanna (2012)
- RV Tarajoq (2021)

== Egypt ==
=== National Institute of Oceanography and Fisheries ===
- RV Salsabil
- RV Yarmouk

== Estonia (EU) ==
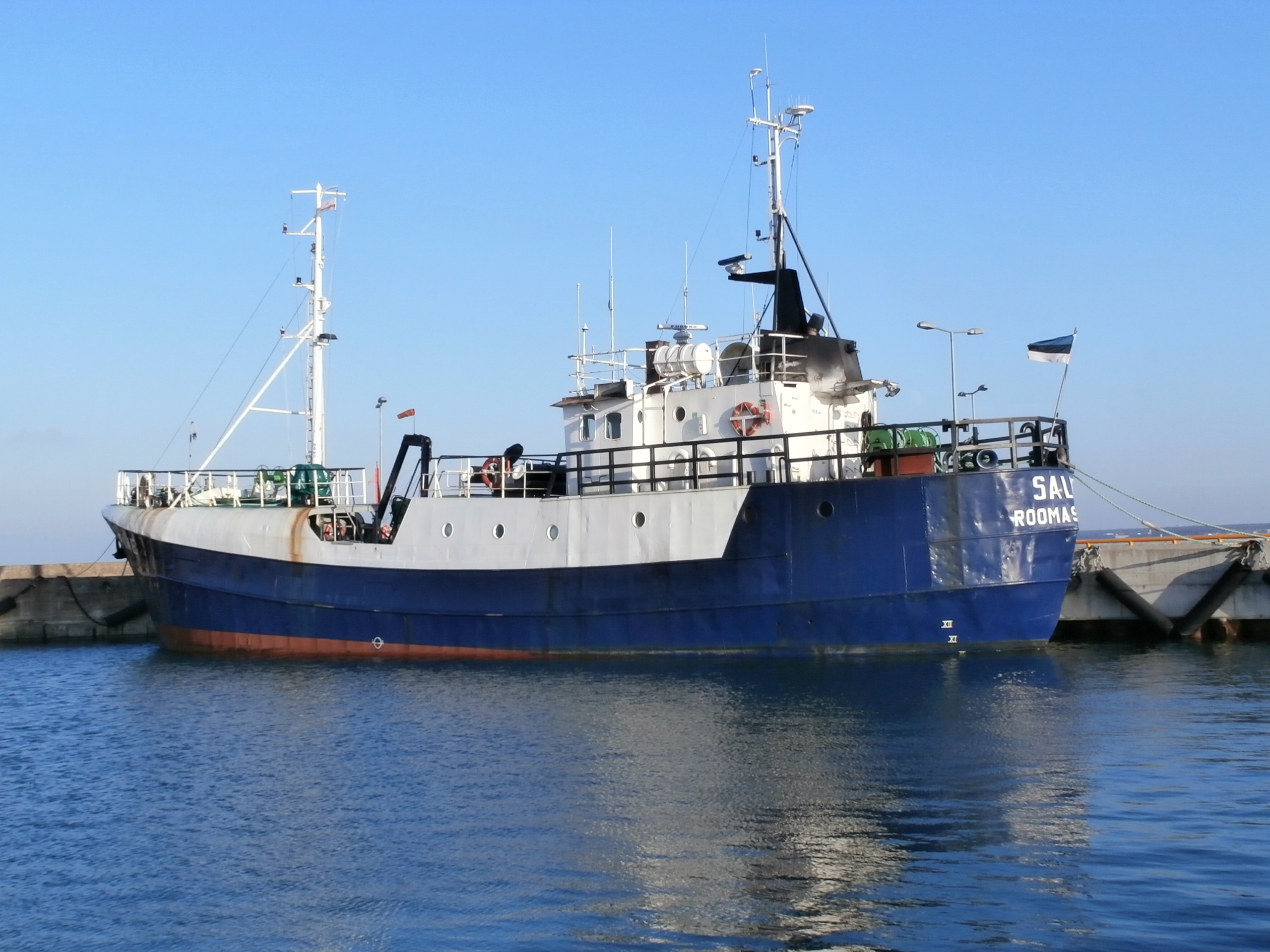
RV Salme

=== Tallinn University of Technology ===
- RV Salme

=== University of Tartu ===
- AluDevil 33
- Aurelie
- Emili 007
- Fortuuna
- Welle

=== Estonian Maritime Museum ===
- Mare (1983-2018)

== Finland (EU) ==
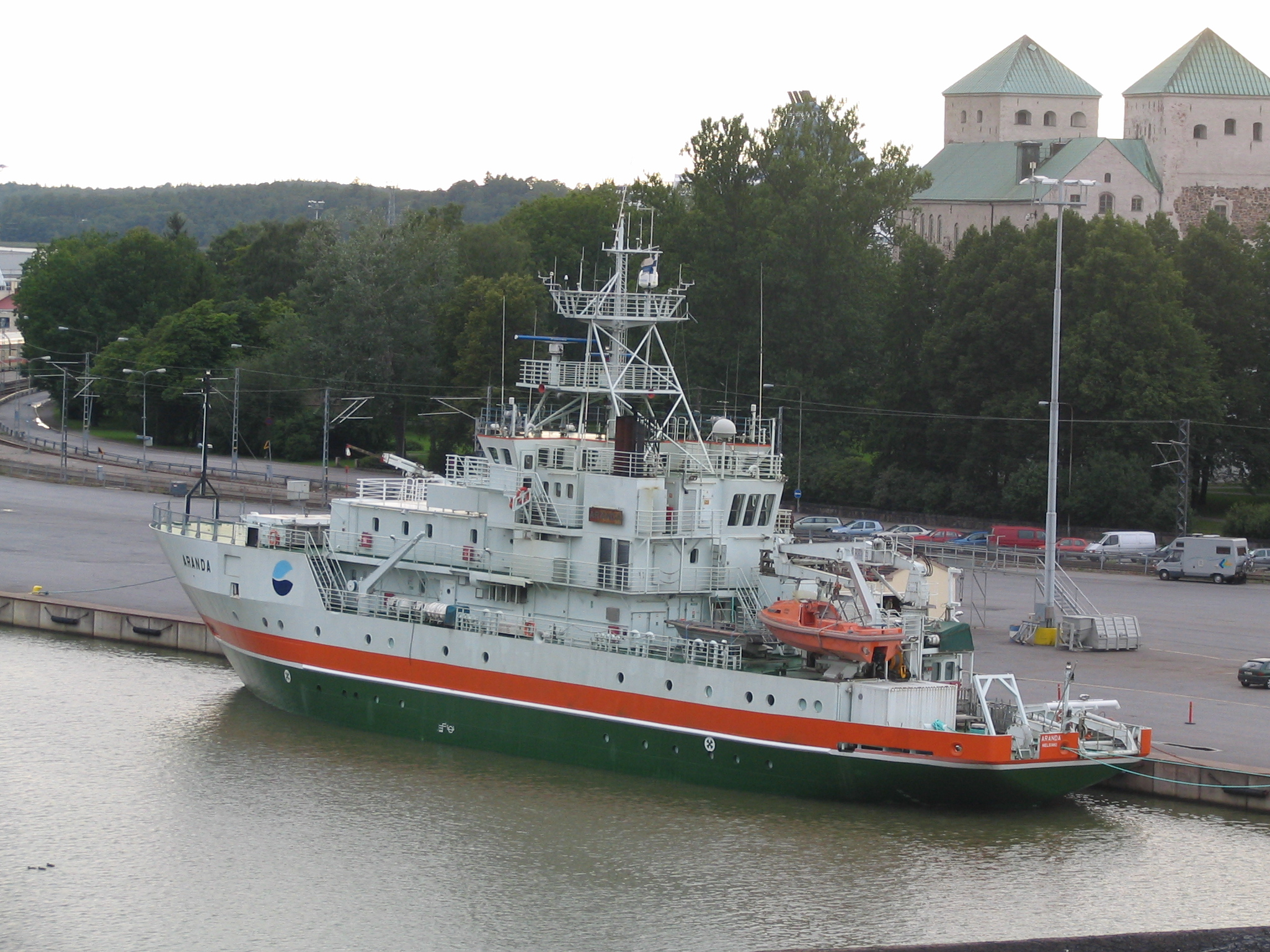
Aranda

- Aranda (1953-1989)
- Aranda (1989)
- Muikku
- Aurelia
- Seili I
- Seili II
- Geomari
- Kaiku
- Saduria

== France (EU) ==
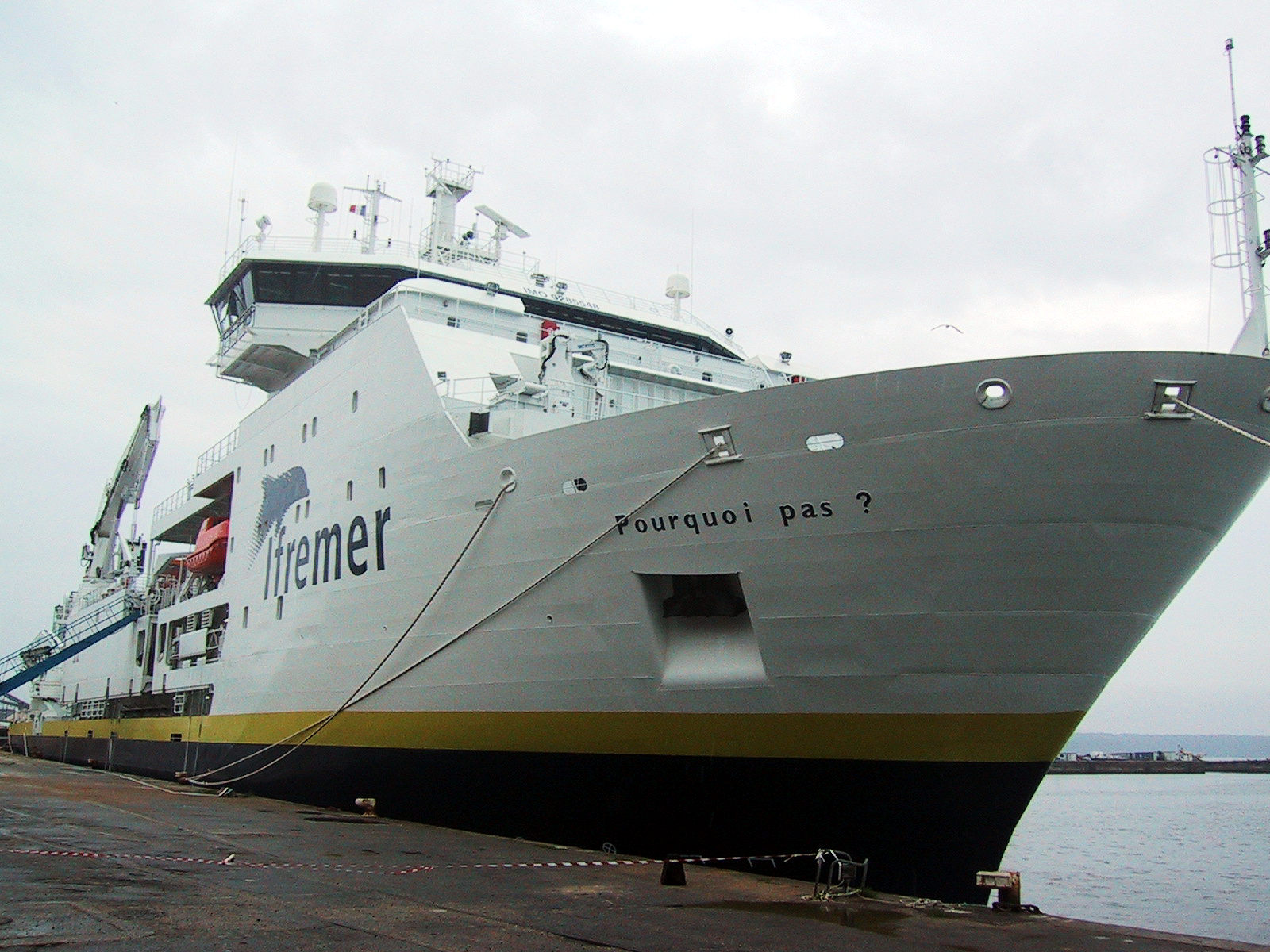
RV Pourquoi Pas?

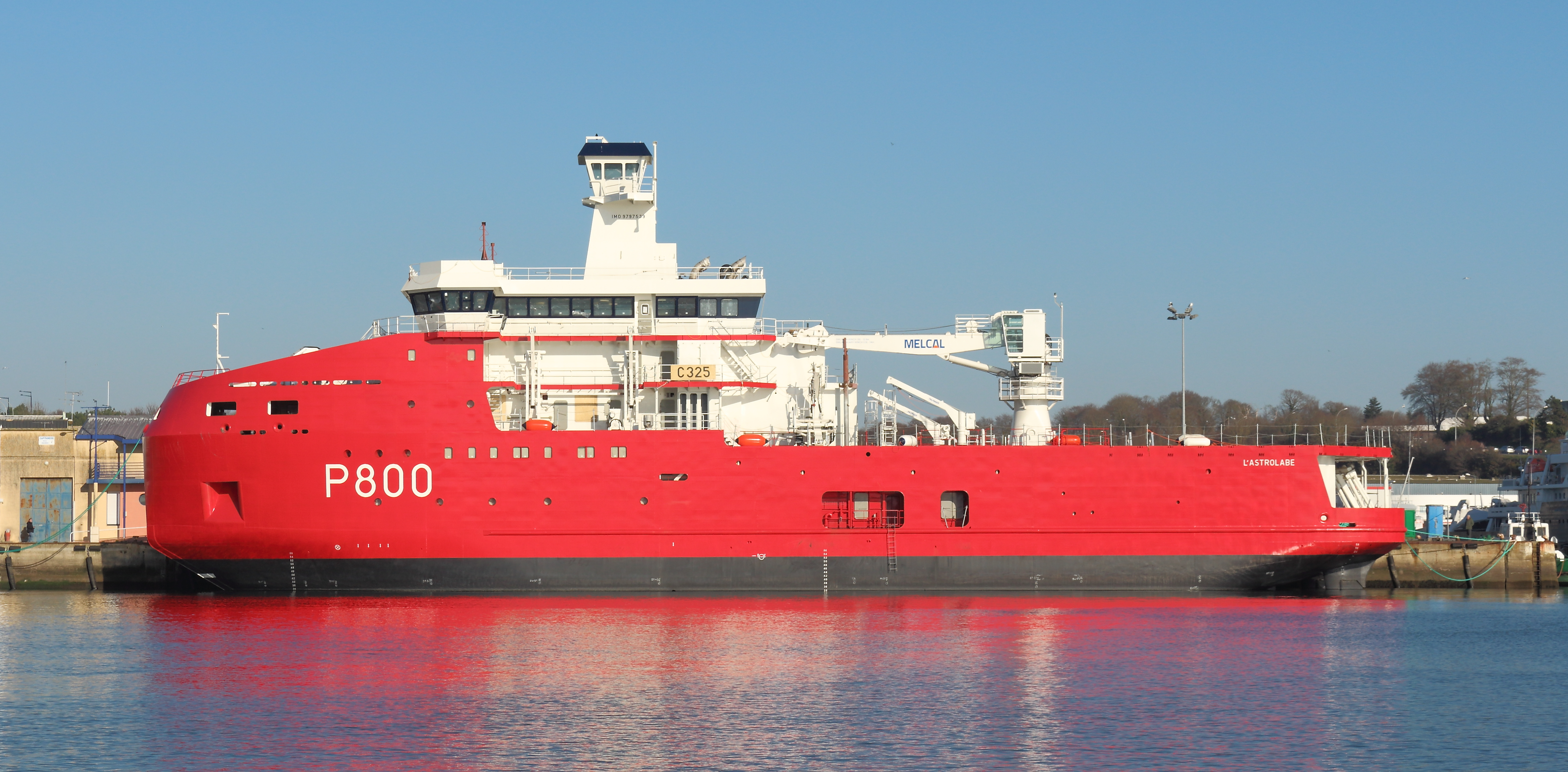
L'Astrolabe

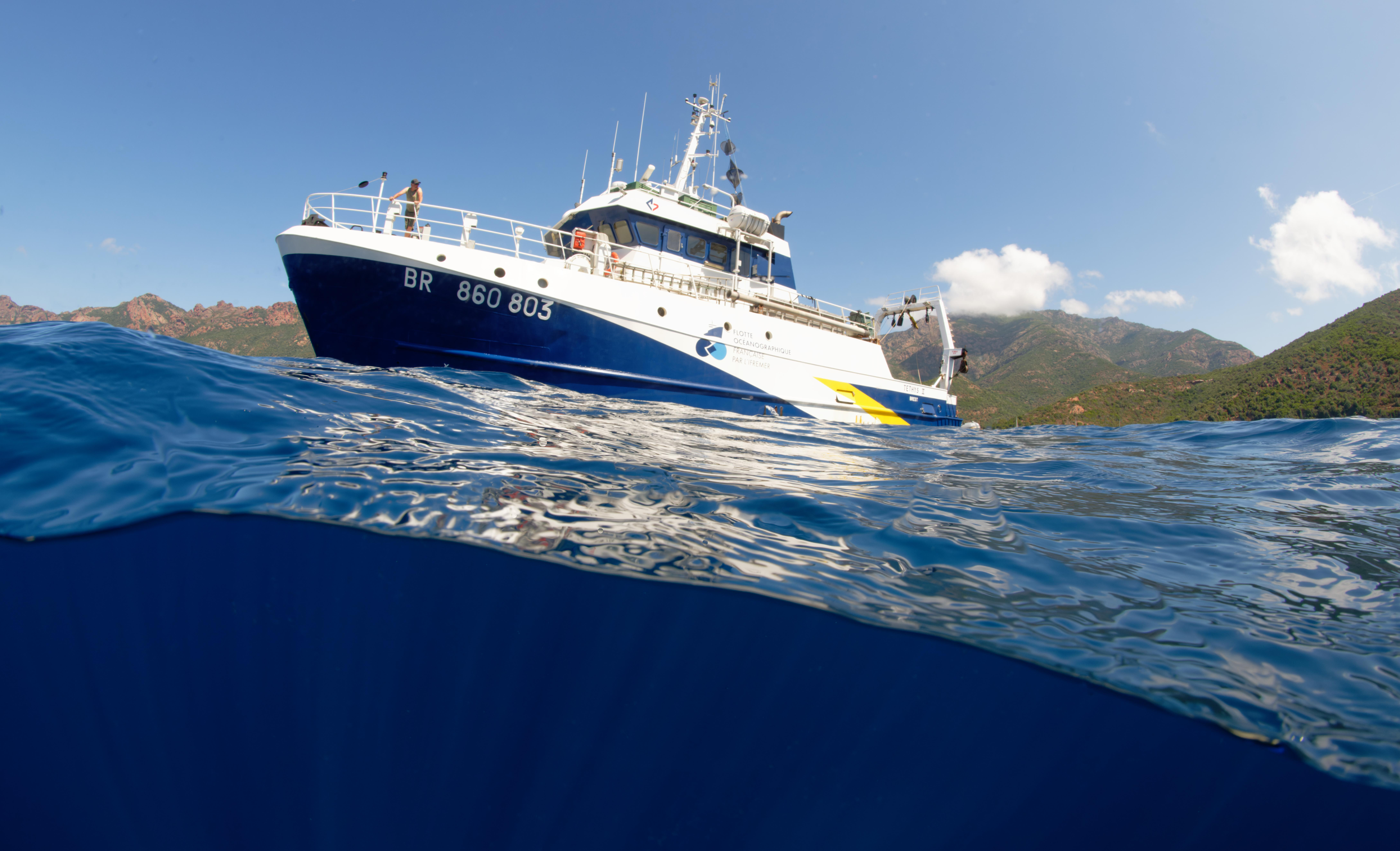
Téthys II

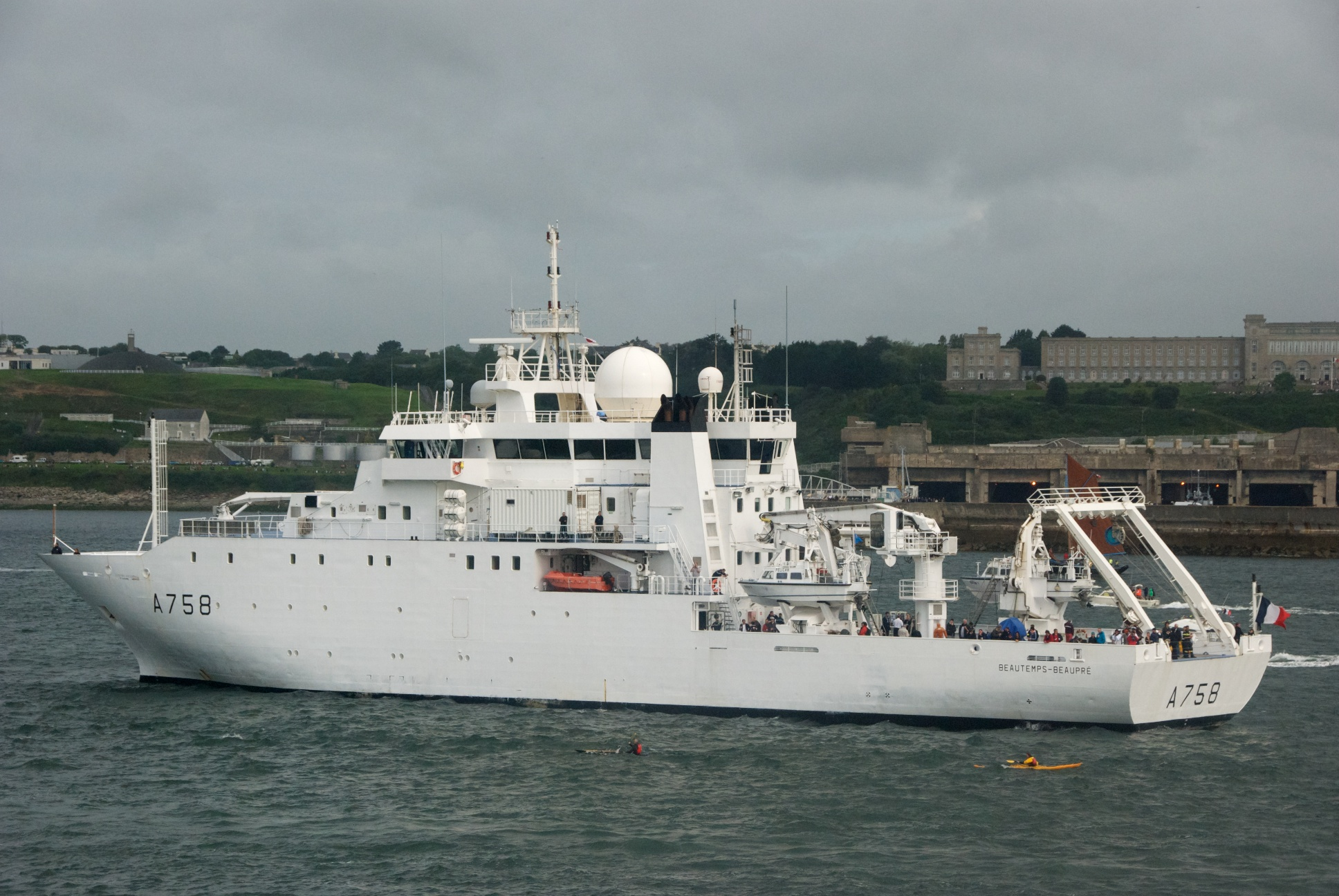
French Navy survey ship A758 Beautemps-Beaupré.

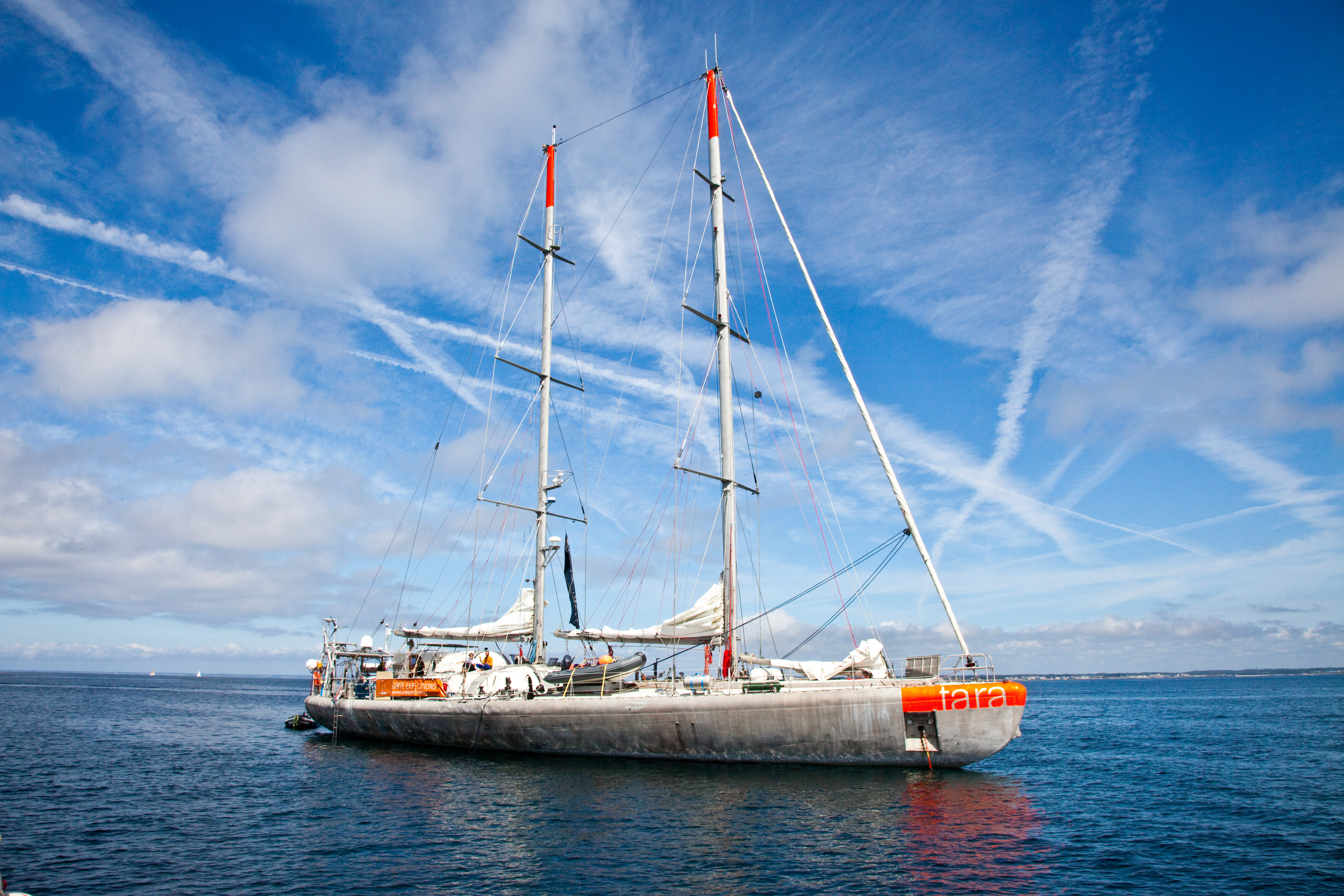
Tara

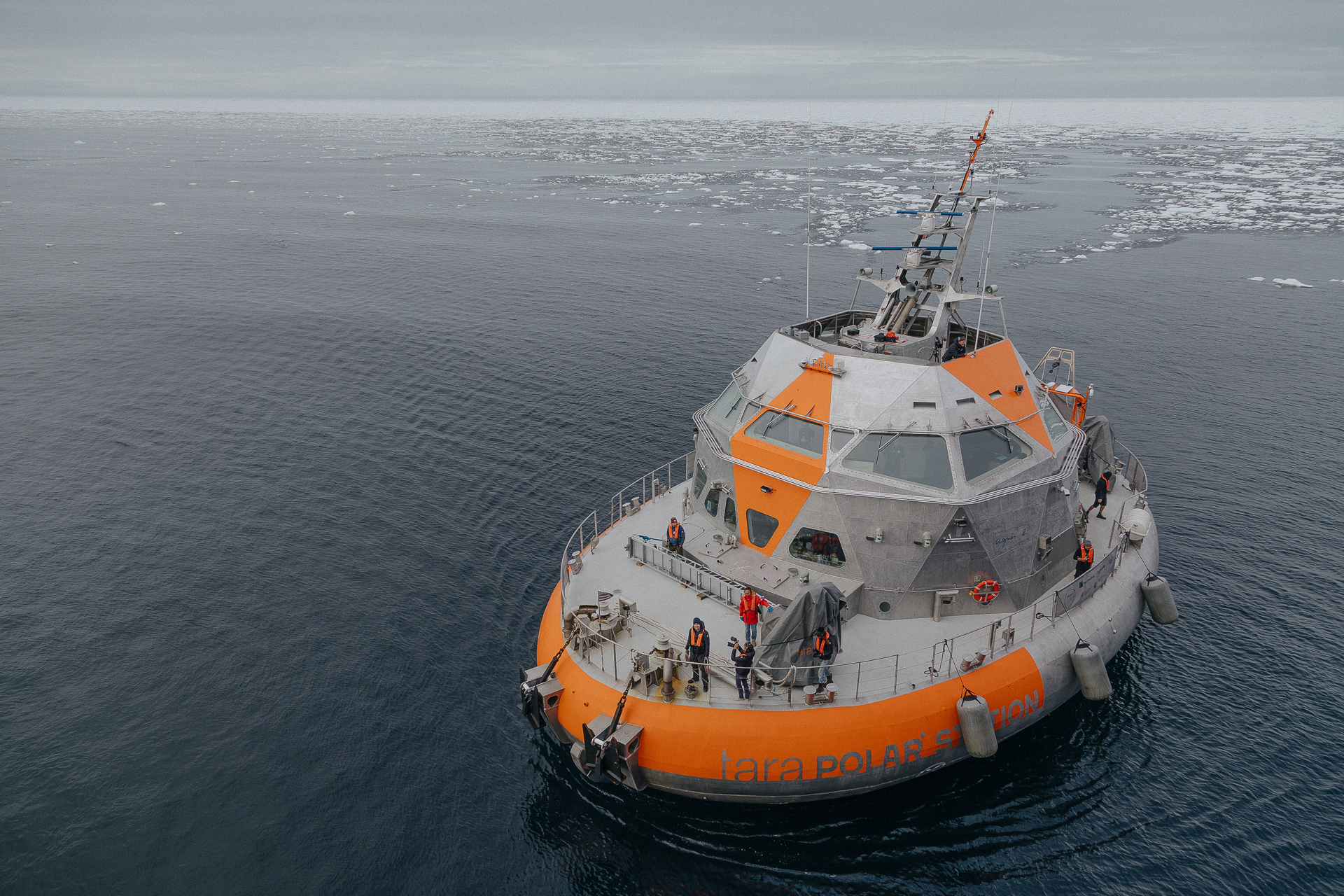
Tara Polar Station (2025)

- RV Jean Charcot (1965-1989)
- RV Gwen-Drez (1976-2016)
- RV Côte d'Aquitaine

=== CNRS ===
- RV Albert Lucas
- RV Antédon II
- RV Néréis II
- RV Neomysis
- RV Planula IV
- RV Sagitta III
- RV Sépia II

=== Ifremer ===
- RV Anita Conti (operational in 2026)
- RV Antea
- RV L'Atalante
- RV Côtes de la Manche
- RV La Curieuse (transferred to a private owner)
- RV L'Europe
- RV Haliotis
- RV Marion Dufresne
- RV Pourquoi Pas?
- RV Thalassa
- RV Thalia
- RV Téthys II
- RV Le Suroît

=== French Ministry of Culture ===
- Alfred Merlin (2021)

=== Cousteau Society ===
- RV Calypso (1950–1997)
- Anaconda
- Alcyone (1985)

=== Tara Ocean Foundation ===
- Tara
- Tara Polar Station

=== Des Requins et des Hommes ===
- Parsifal (2025)

=== French Southern and Antarctic Lands ===
- L'Astrolabe (1986-2017)
- L'Astrolabe (2016)

=== Survey vessels ===
- A758 Beautemps-Beaupré
- A791 Lapérouse
- A792 Borda
- A793 Laplace

== Germany (EU) ==
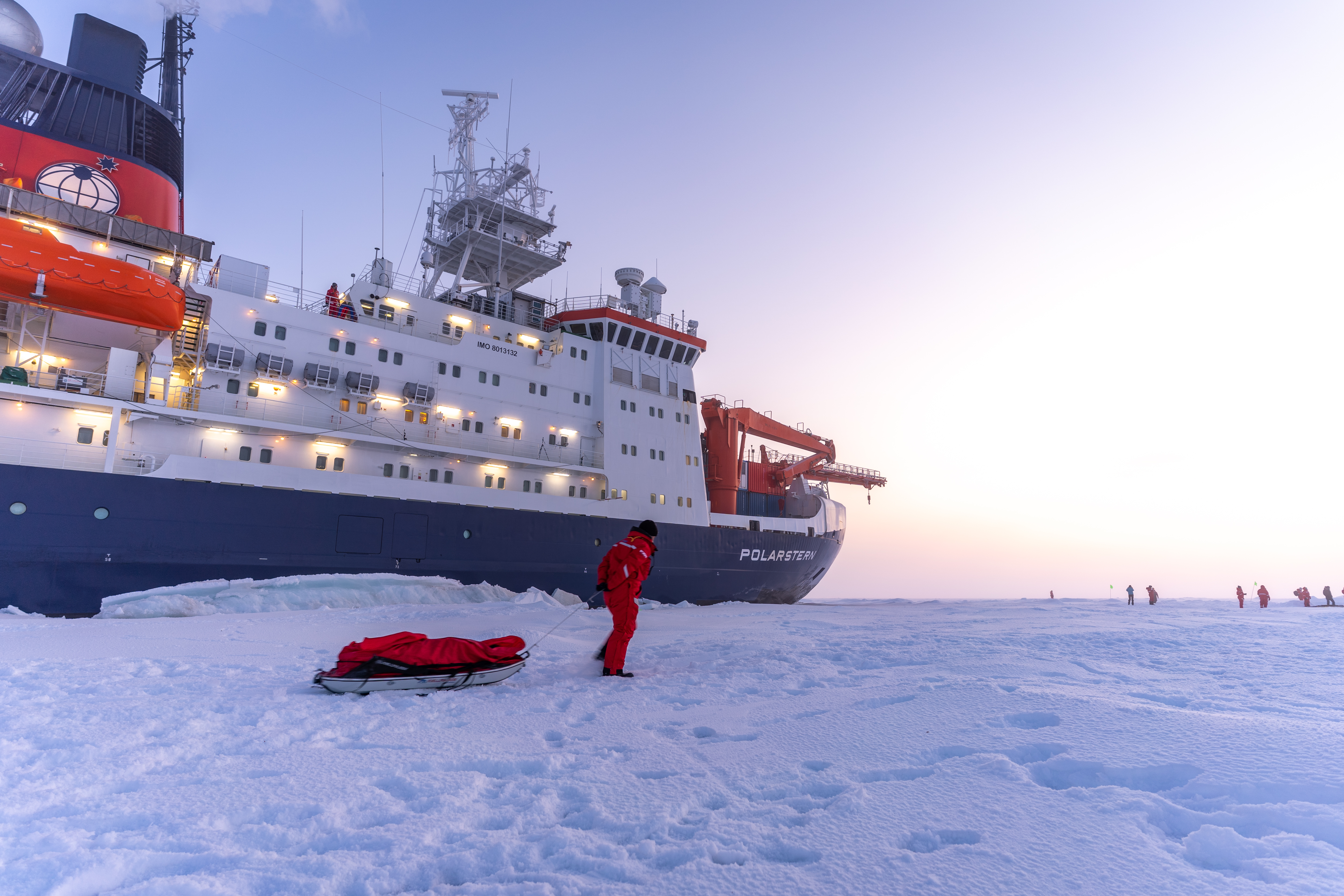
RV Polarstern

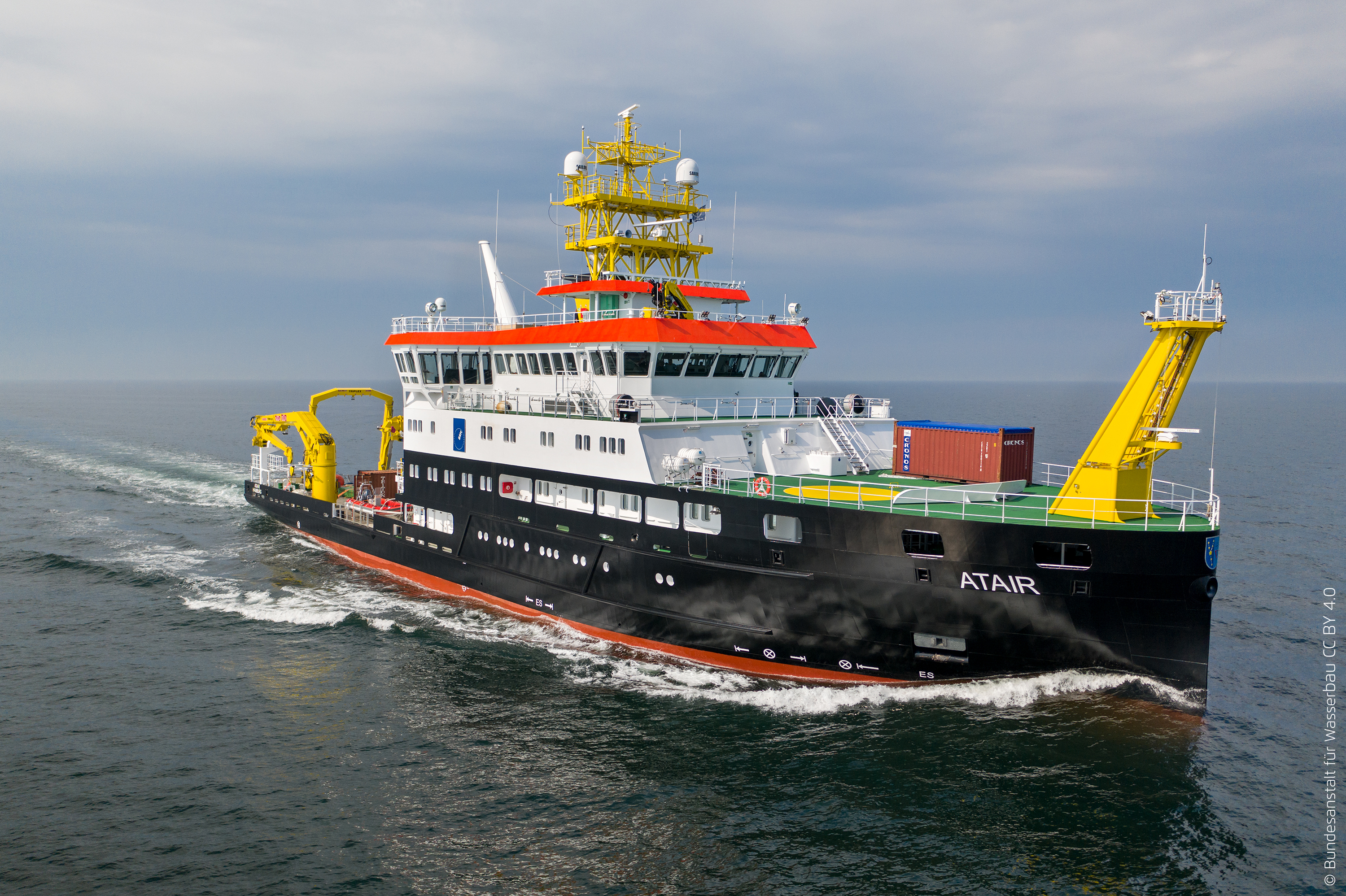
RV Atair

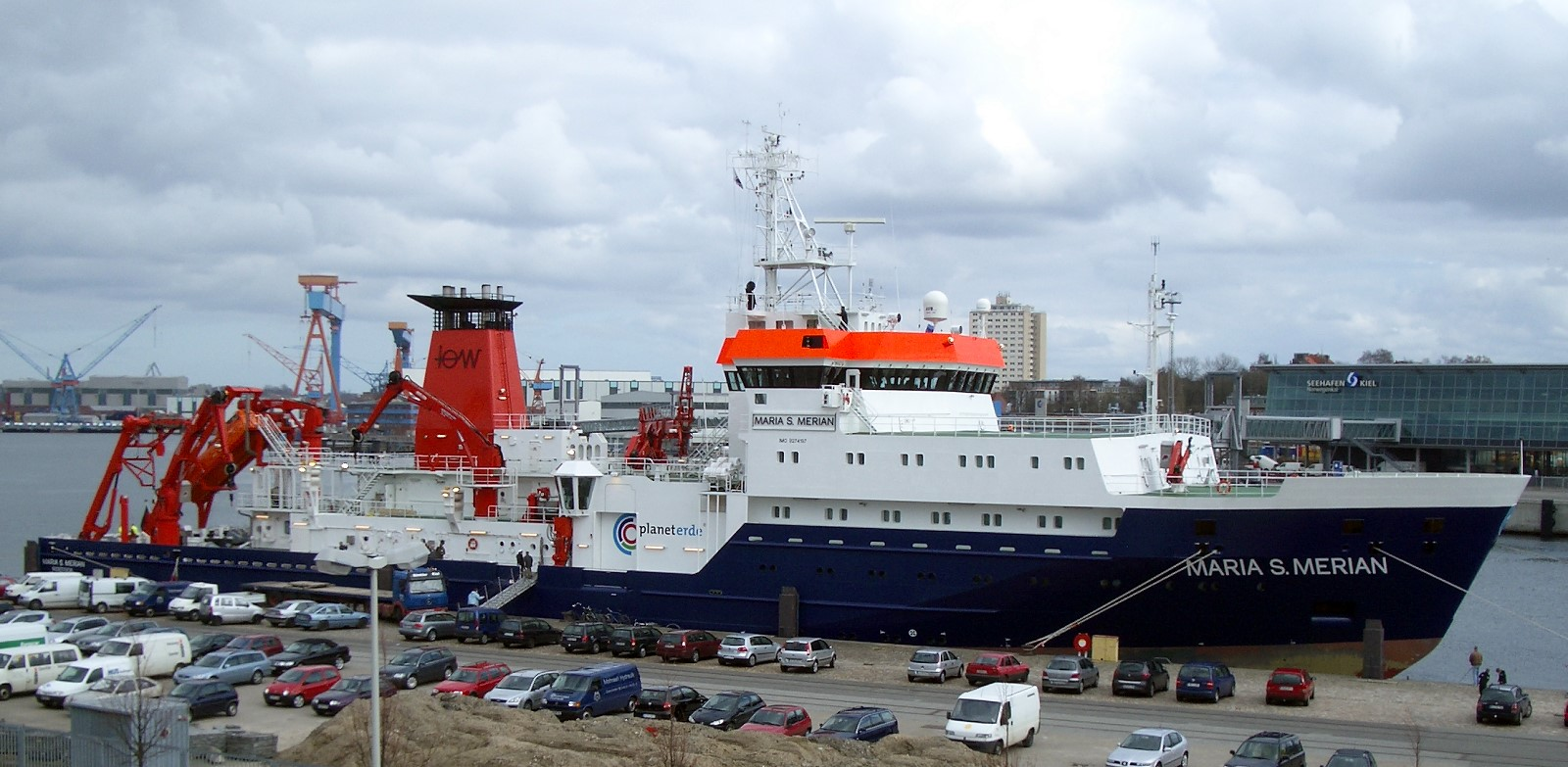
RV Maria S. Merian

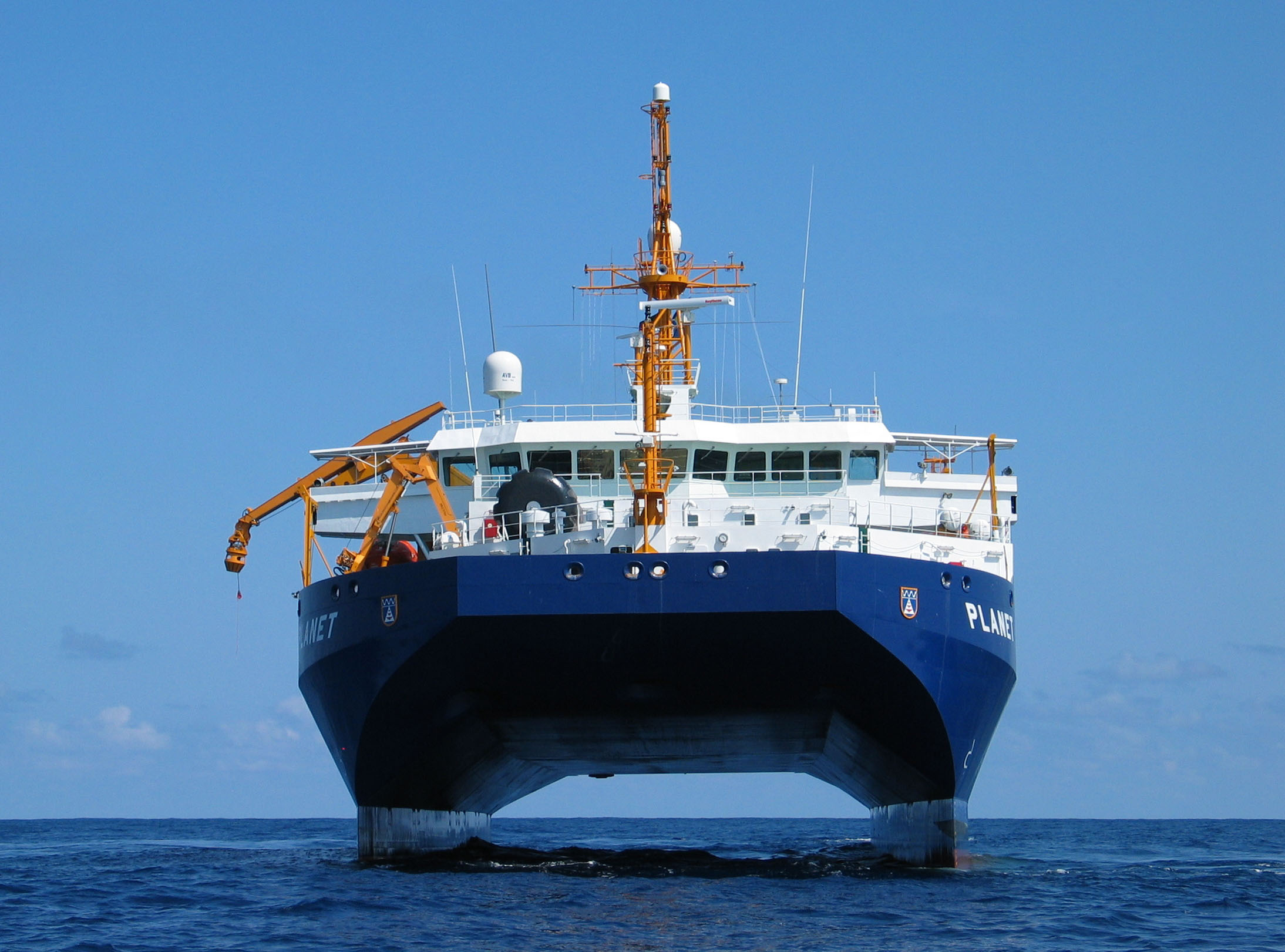
Research ship Planet

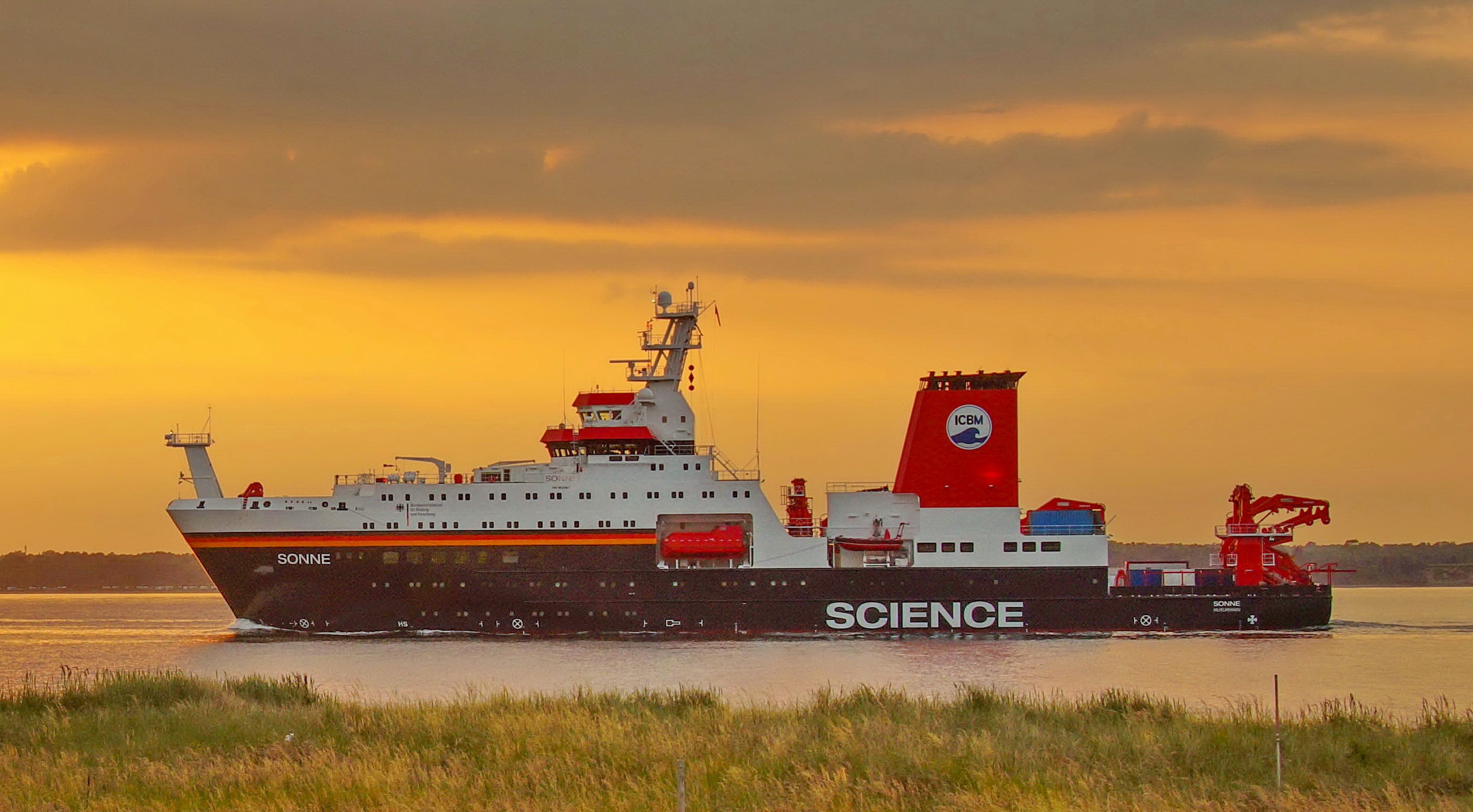
RV Sonne

- FRV Capella (2004)
- FRV Clupea (2012)
- FRV Deneb (1994)
- FRV Komet (1998)
- FRV Solea (2004)
- FRV Walther Herwig III (1993)
- FRV Wega (1990)
- RV Haithabu (2014)
- RV Ludwig Prandtl (1983)
- RV Meteor (1924-1945)
- RV Meteor (1964)
- RV Senckenberg
- RV Sonne (1978-2014; sold to Argentina; now ARA Austral)
- RV Valdivia

=== German Navy ===
- Planet (2005)

=== Federal Ministry of Education and Research ===
- RV Meteor (1986)
- RV Sonne (2014)

=== Federal Maritime and Hydrographic Agency ===
- RV Atair (2021)

=== Alfred Wegener Institute ===
- RV Uthörn (1947)
- RV Uthörn (1982)
- RV Mya (replaced by Mya II)
- RV Polarstern (1982)
- RV Heincke (1990)
- RV Mya II (2013)

=== Leibniz Institute for Baltic Sea Research ===
- RV Alexander von Humboldt (replaced by Maria S. Merian; now EV Nautilus)
- RV Professor A. Penck (1951-2010; replaced by RV Elisabeth Mann Borgese)
- RV Maria S. Merian (2006)
- RV Elisabeth Mann Borgese (2011)

=== GEOMAR Kiel ===
- RV Südfall (1946 – 1966; 1958 renamed RV Hermann Wattenberg)
- RV Alkor (1966-1990)
- Sagitta (1966-1997)
- RV Littorina (1975)
- RV Poseidon (1976-2020; sold to Sea-Watch, now Humanity 1)
- RV Alkor (1990)
- Polarfuchs (1997)

=== Max Planck Institute for Chemistry ===
- RV Eugen Seibold (2018)

== Greece (EU) ==
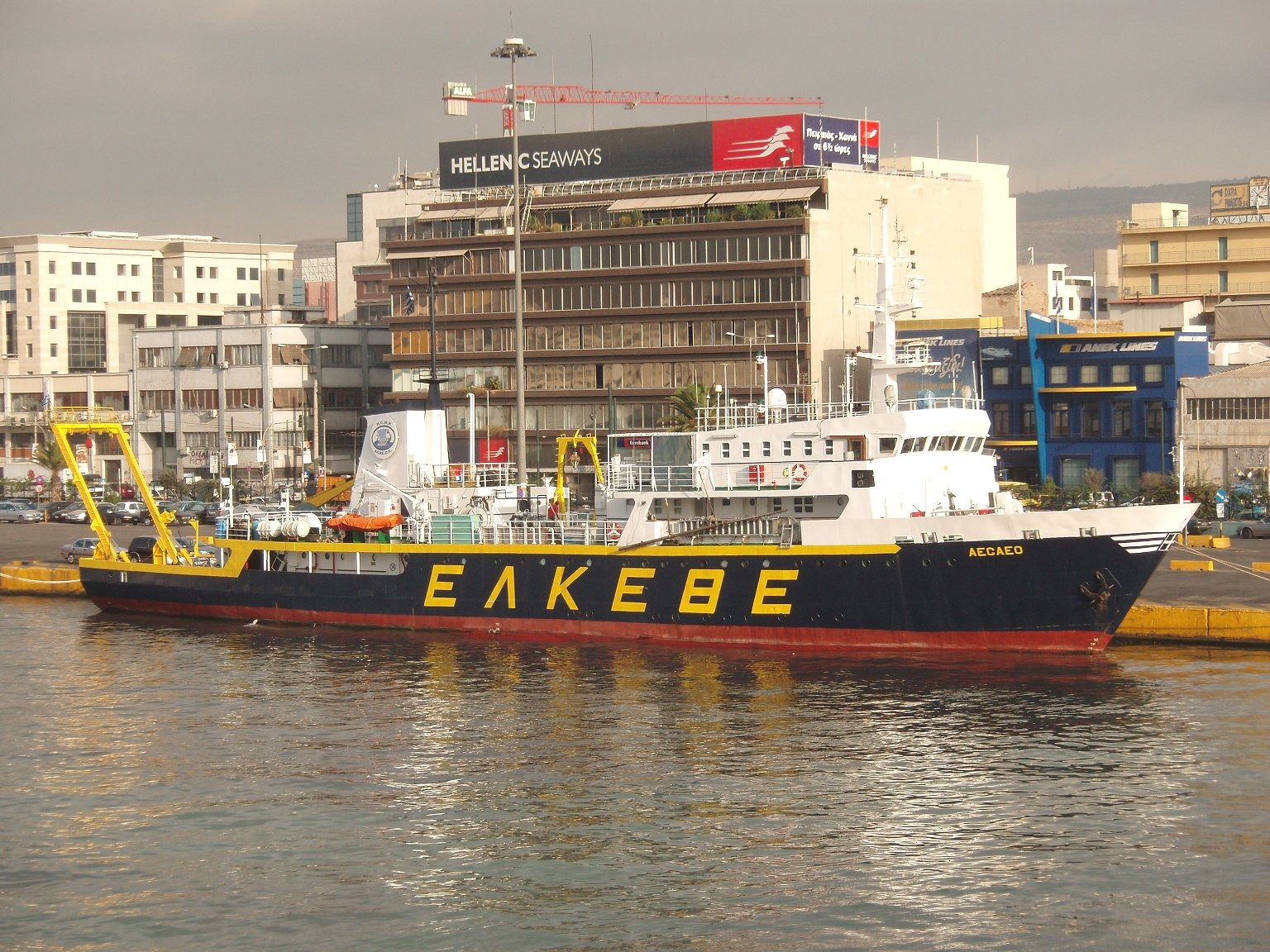
RV Aegaeo

- RV Aegaeo
- RV Philia

=== Survey vessels ===
- HS Naftilos (A-478)
- HS Pytheas (A-474)
- HS Strabon (A-476)

== Iceland ==
=== Marine and Freshwater Research Institute ===
- RV Árni Friðriksson (2000)
- RV Bjarni Sæmundsson (1970-2025)
- RV Þórunn Þórðardóttir (2024)

=== Icelandic Coast Guard ===
- Survey vessel BALDUR (1991)

== India ==
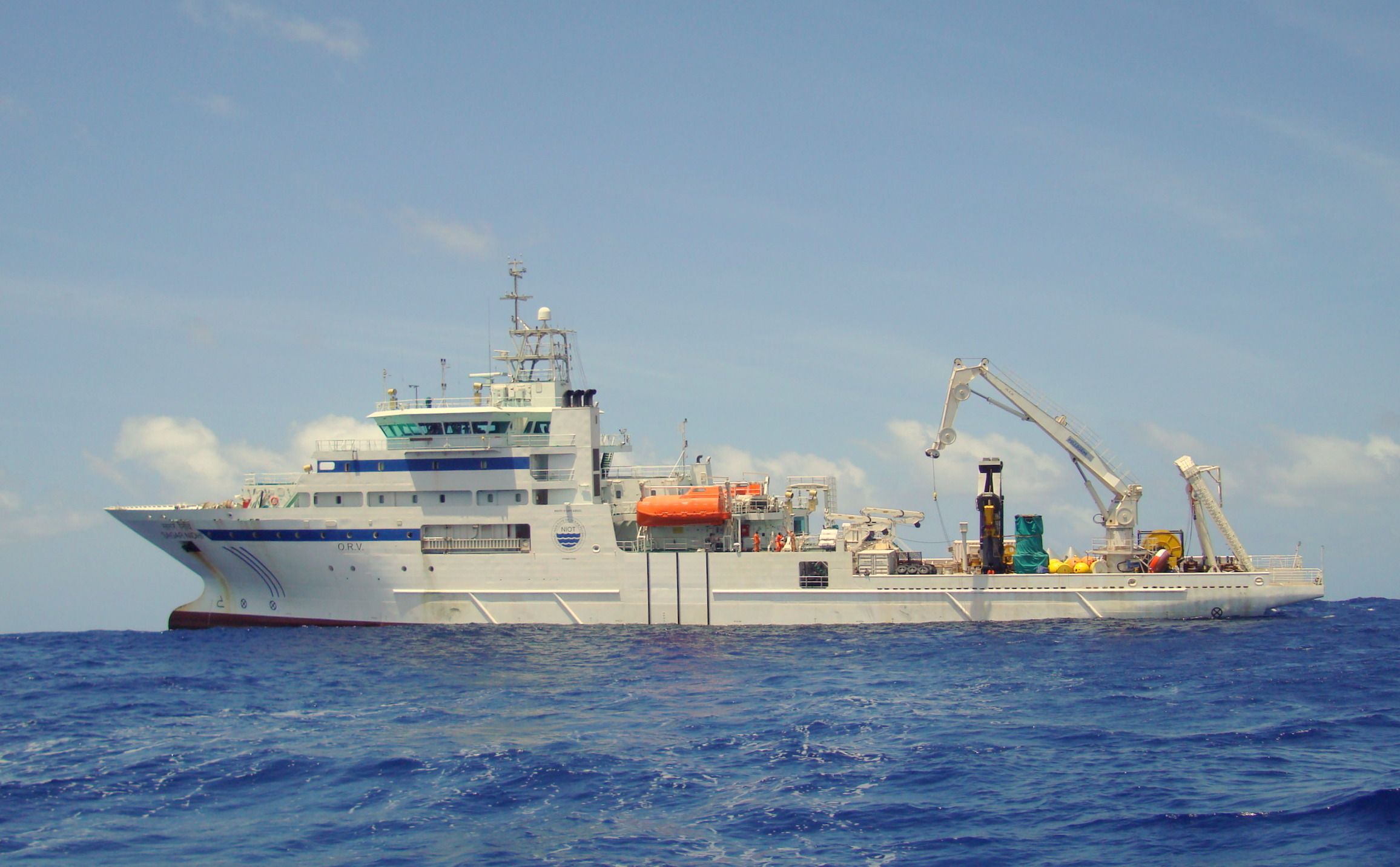
ORV Sagar Nidhi

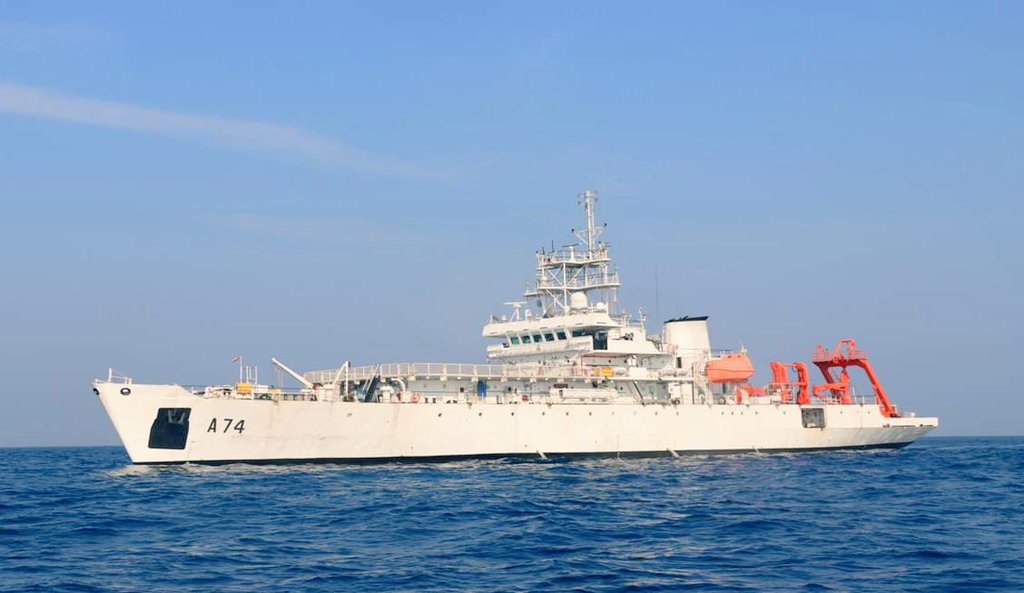
INS Sagardhwani

- ORV Sindhu Sankalp
- ORV Samudra Ratnakar
- ORV Sindhu Sadhana
- ORV Sagar Sukhthi
- ORV Sagar Nidhi
- ORV Sagar Manjusha
- ORV Sagar Samrat
- ORV Sagar Paschimi
- ORV Sagar Kanya
- INS Sagardhwani
- FORV Sagar Sampada
- M.V GEO HINDSAGAR
- RV Gaveshani

=== Survey vessels ===
- INS Mesh (J34)
- INS Sandhayak (J18) (1981-2021)
- INS Nirdeshak (J19) (1982-2014)
- INS Nirupak (J20) (1985-2024)
- INS Investigator (J15) (1990)
- INS Jamuna (J16) (1991)
- INS Sutlej (J17) (1993)
- INS Darshak (J21) (2001)
- INS Sarvekshak (J22) (2002)
- INS Makar (J31) (2012)
- INS Sandhayak (J18) (2024)

== Indonesia ==
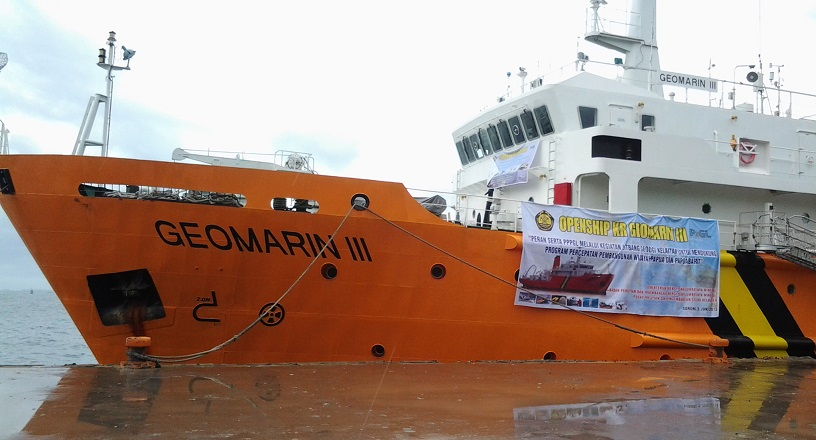
Geomarin III

- Geomarin III (2014)
- RV MADIDIHANG-03

=== National Research and Innovation Agency ===
- Baruna Jaya I
- Baruna Jaya III
- Baruna Jaya VIII

=== Indonesian Navy ===
- KRI Rigel (2015)
- KRI Spica (2015)
- KRI Dewa Kembar
- KRI Pollux
- KAL Aries
- KAL Vega

== Iran ==
=== Iranian National Institute for Oceanography and Atmospheric Science ===
- Khalije Fars sea explorer (2017)

== Ireland (EU) ==
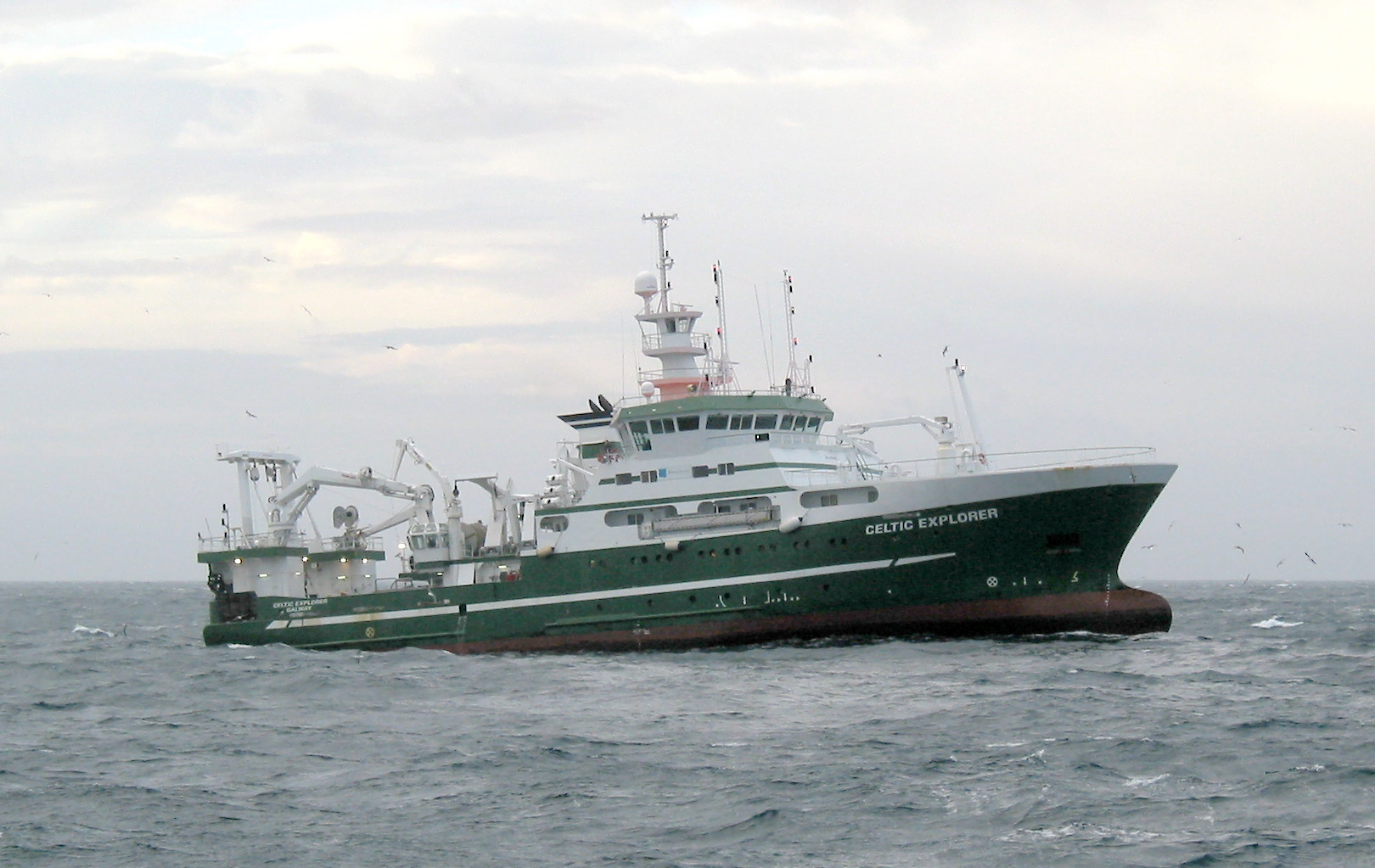
RV Celtic Explorer

- RV Celtic Explorer (2003)
- RV Celtic Voyager (in 2023 sold to the Qikiqtaaluk Corporation of Nunavut)
- MV Cosantóir Bradán
- RV Geo
- RV Keary
- RV Lough Beltra (1988-1997)
- RV Tom Crean (2022)
- RV Tonn

== Italy (EU) ==
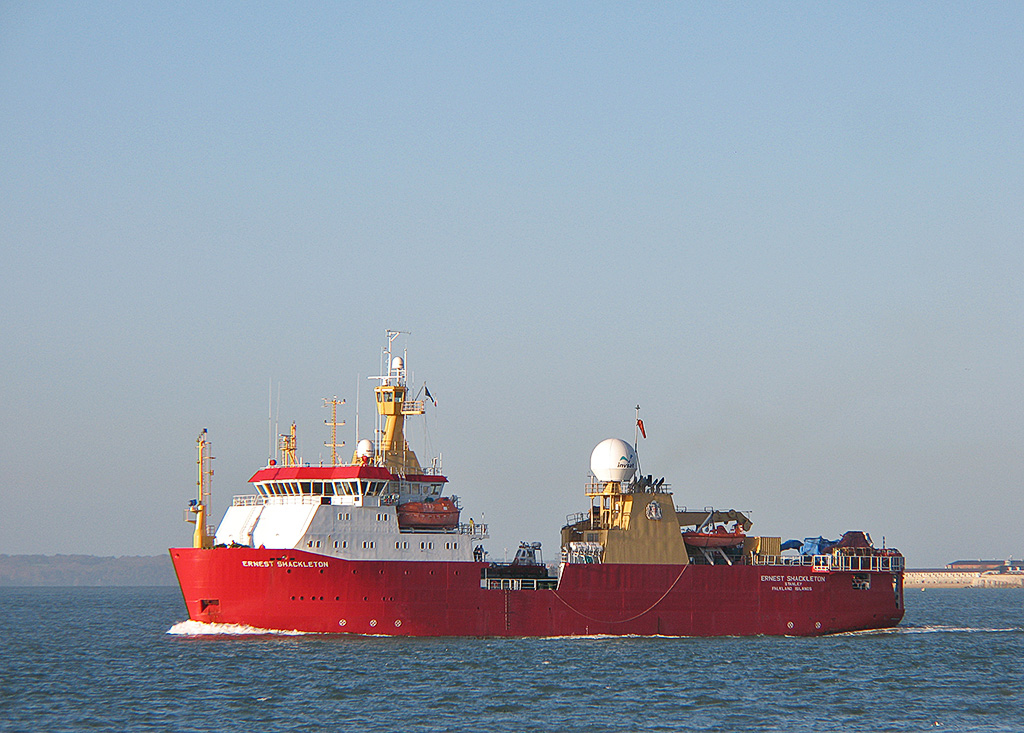
RRS Ernest Shackleton, now RV Laura Bassi

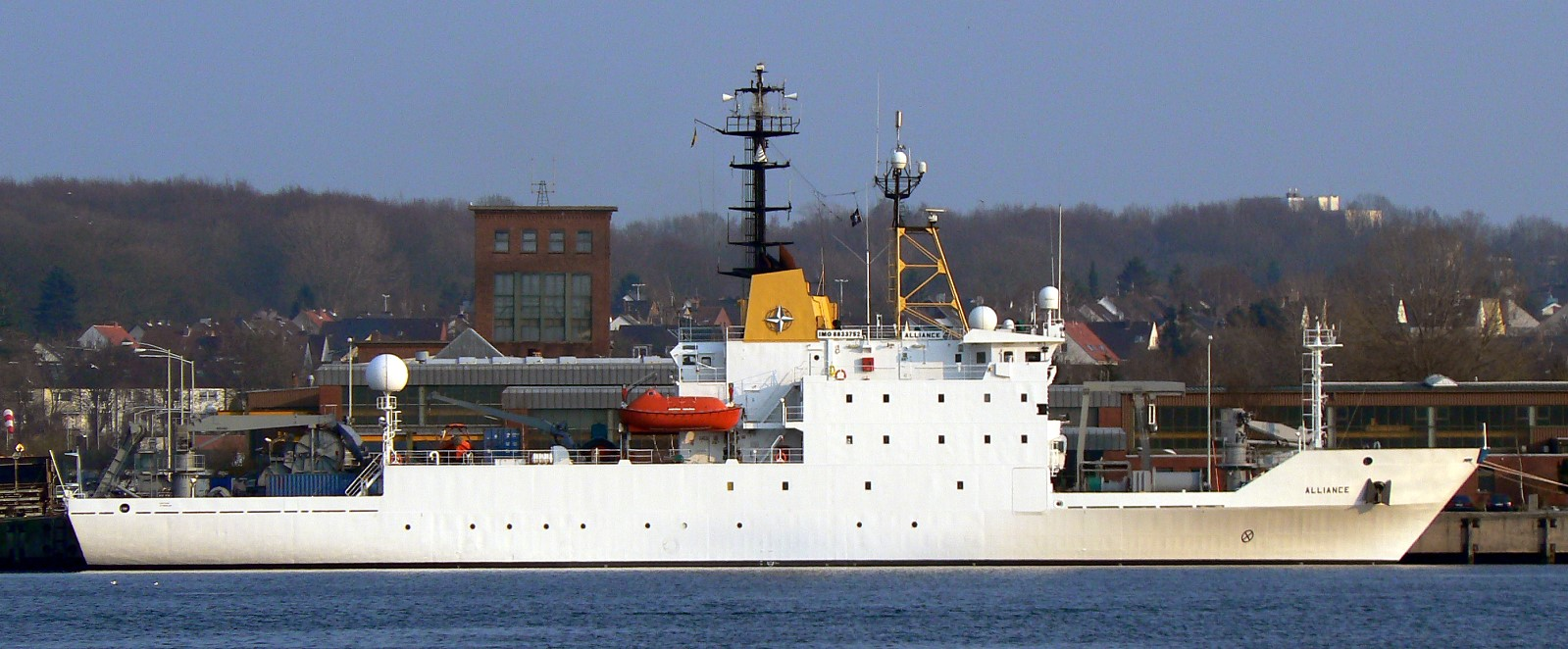
RV Alliance

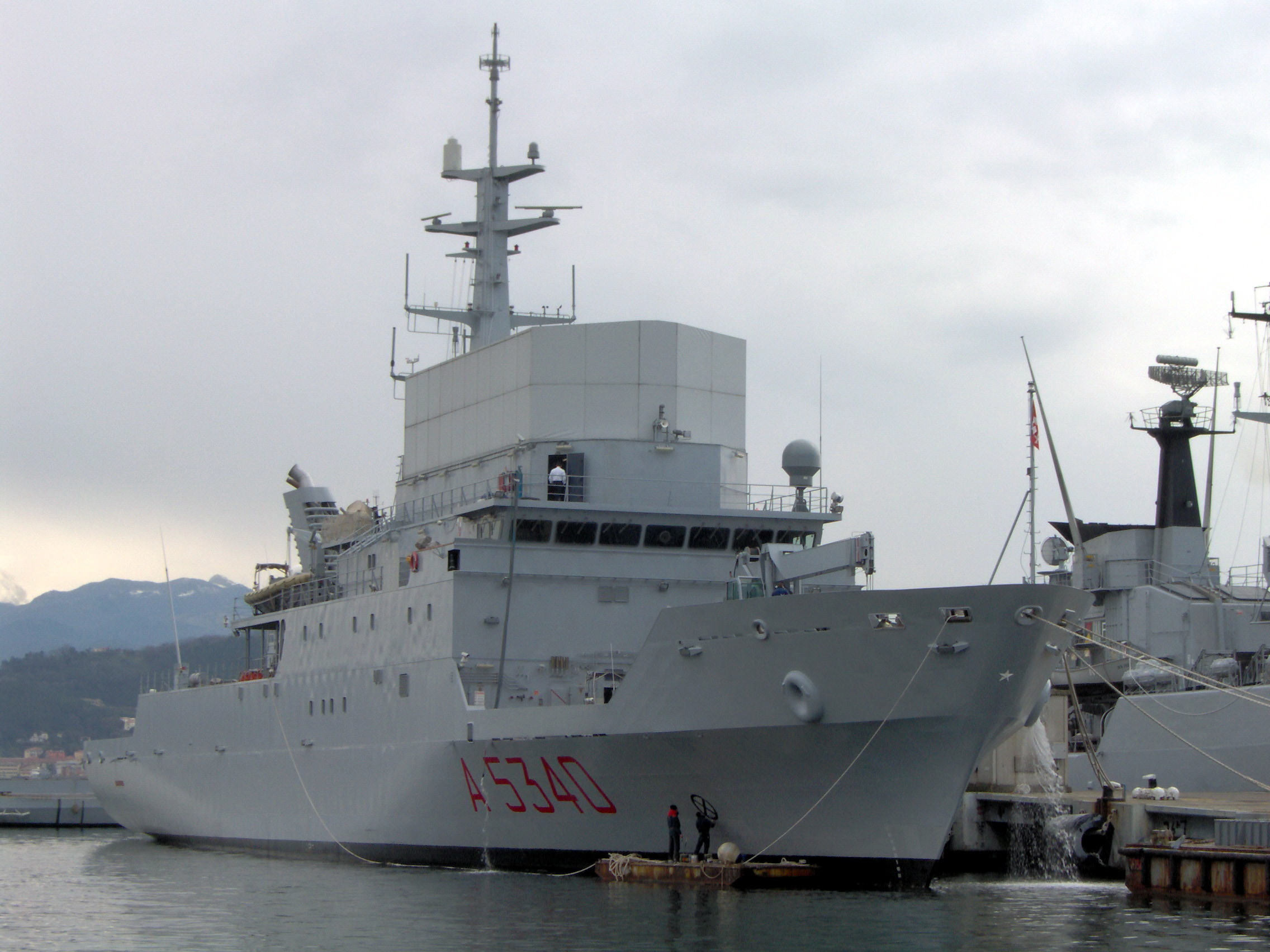
RV Elettra

- RV Andrea
- RV Astrea
- RV Cerruti
- RV Dallaporta
- RV Furetto
- Gaia Blu
- RV Italica
- RV Laura Bassi
- RV Luigi Sanzo
- RV Maria Grazia
- RV Minerva Uno
- RV OGS Explora
- RV Regione Lazio 1
- RV Tecnopesca II
- RV Trer
- RV Andromeda
- RV Futura
- RV Cormorano II

=== Italian Navy ===
- RV Alliance A 5345 (NATO vessel, since 1 January 2016 under Italian Navy flag)
- RV Leonardo A 5301 (NATO vessel, since 11 May 2007 under Italian government flag and since 14 May 2010 under Italian Navy flag)
- RV Ammiraglio Magnaghi A 5303
- RV Aretusa A 5304
- RV Elettra A 5340
- RV Galatea A 5308
- RV Vincenzo Martellotta A 5320
- RV Raffaele Rossetti A 5315

== Japan ==
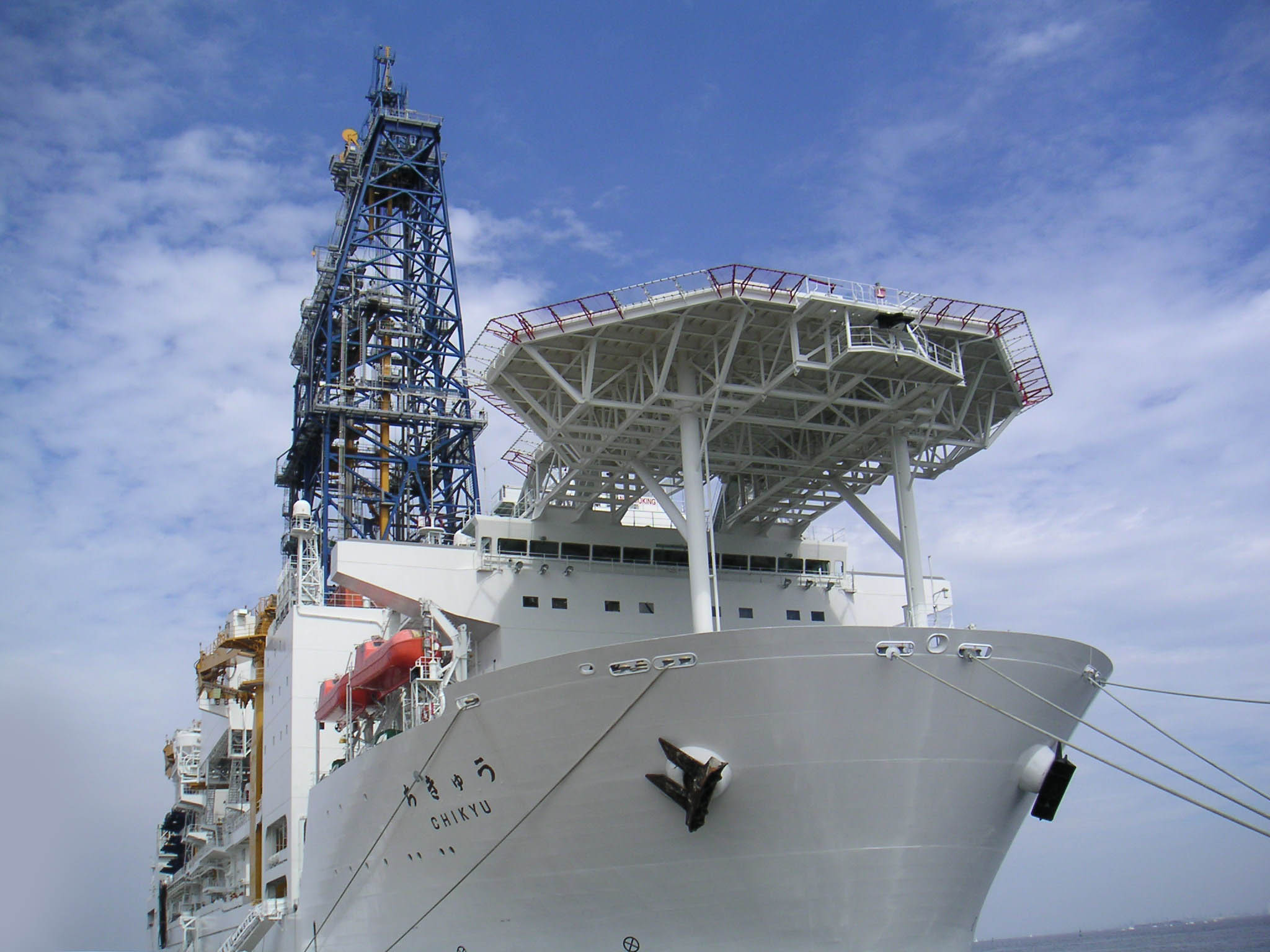
Chikyū

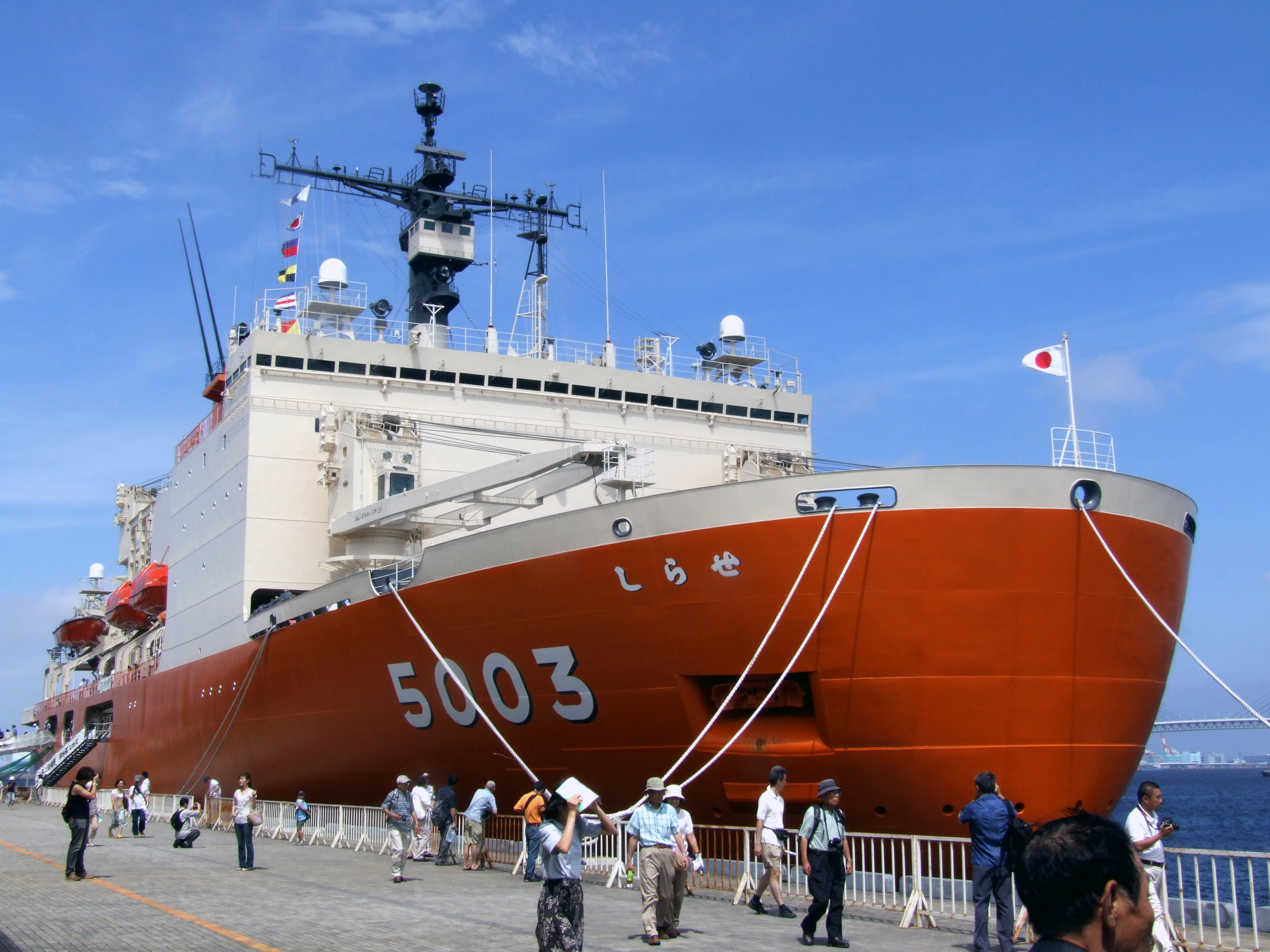
Shirase

- RV Chikyū
- RV Hakurei Maru
- RV Hakuho Maru
- RV Kaimei
- RV Kairei
- RV Kaiyo
- RV Mirai (formerly, Mutsu)
- RV Natsushima
- RV Shigen (formerly, RV Ramform Victory of Petroleum Geo-Services)
- RV Umitaka Maru
- RV Yokosuka
- RV Nisshin Maru

=== Japan Maritime Self-Defense Force ===
- Shirase
- JS Suma (AGS-5103)
- JS Wakasa (AGS-5104)
- AGS Shōnan
- AGS Nichinan
- AGS Futami

== Republic of Korea ==
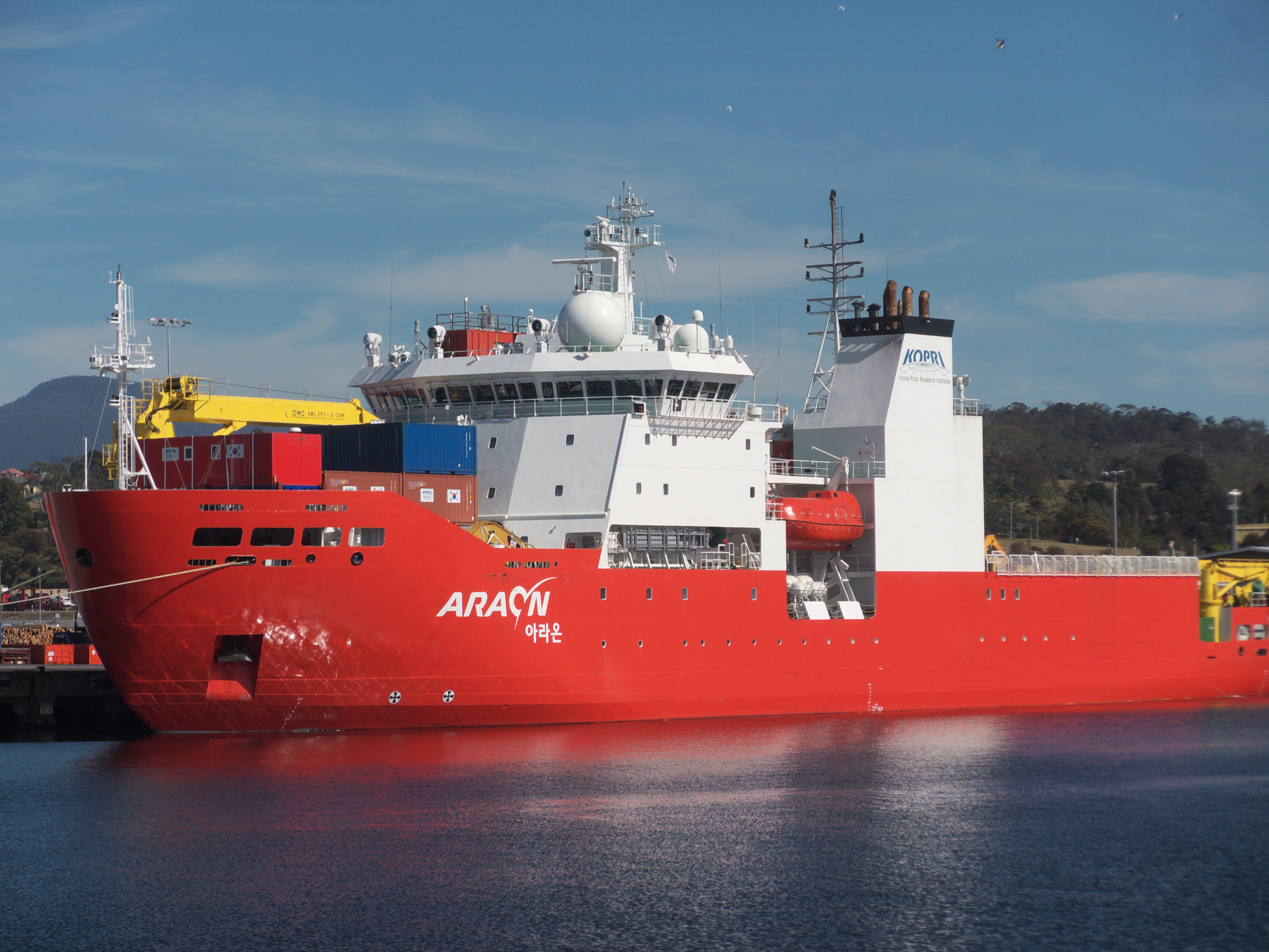
RV Araon

=== Korea Polar Research Institute ===
- RV Araon (2009)

=== Korea Institute of Ocean Science and Technology ===
- RV Dokdo Nuri
- RV EARDO (1992)
- RV ISABU (2016)
- RV JANGMOK 1
- RV JANGMOK 2
- RV ONNURI (1992)

=== Korea Institute of Geoscience and Mineral Resources ===
- Tamhae 3 (2024)

=== Survey vessels ===
- ROKS Sincheonji
- ROKS Sinsegi

== Kazakhstan ==
- Kanysh Satpayev (2014)

=== Survey vessels ===
- Jaiyq (2008)

== Latvia (EU) ==
- Kapteinis Orle

=== Maritime Administration of Latvia ===
- Kristiāns Dāls (2001)
- Sonārs (2014)
- Blesser 505 WA

== Lebanon ==
- RV CANA-CNRS

== Lithuania (EU) ==
=== Ministry of Environment ===
- Vėjūnas (2012)

=== Klaipėda University ===
- RV Mintis

== Luxembourg (EU) ==
=== GEOxyz ===
- GEO OCEAN III to GEO OCEAN IX
- GEOSURVEYOR I, IV, V, VI, VIII, IX, XI, XII, XVI, XVII, XXI

== Mauritania ==
- RV Almoravide
- RV N´diago
- RV Al Awam
- RV Amrigue

== Morocco ==
=== National Institute of Fisheries Research ===
- RV Al Hassan Al Marrakchi
- RV Ibn Sina II (2023)

=== Royal Moroccan Navy ===
- Dar Al Beida (2019)

== Namibia ==
- RV Mirabilis

== Netherlands (EU) ==
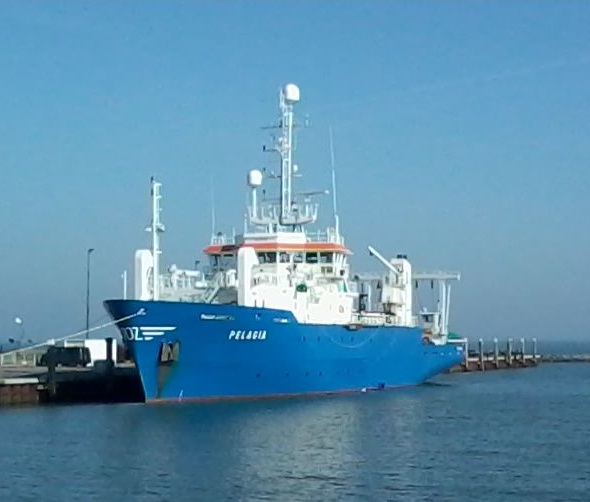
RV Pelagia

- RV Tyro (1979-1993)
- RV Pelagia
- RV Navicula
- RV Stern
- RV Tridens
- RV Isis

=== Survey vessels ===
- HNLMS Willebrord Snellius (1929-1942)
- HNLMS Snellius (A907) (1952-1972)
- HNLMS Luymes (A902) (1952-1973)
- HNLMS Tydeman (A906) (10 November 1976 - 3 June 2004; sold and renamed Plancius in 2007)
- HNLMS Snellius (A802) (2003)
- HNLMS Luymes (A803) (2004)

== New Zealand ==
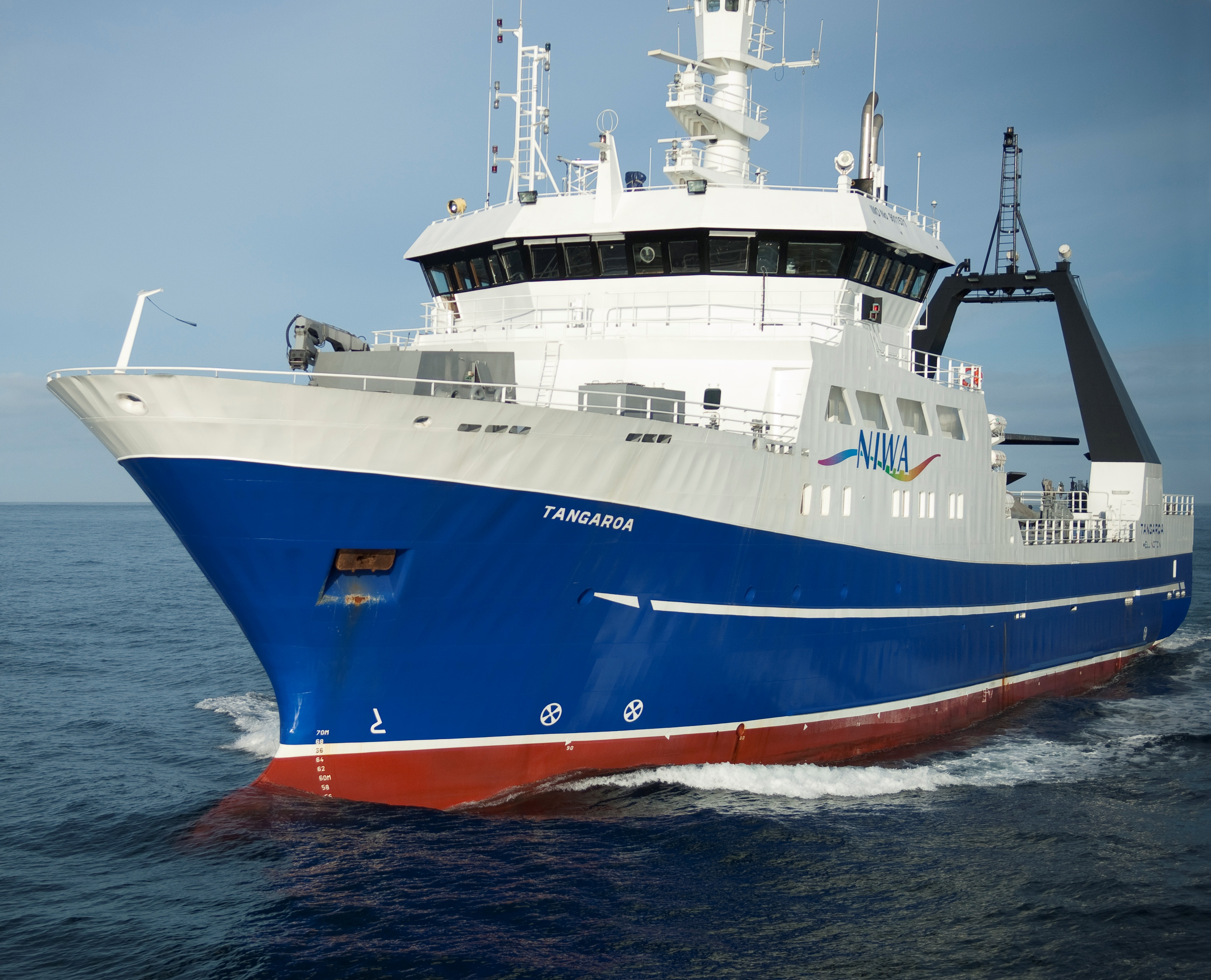
RV Tangaroa

- GRV James Cook (1969-1991)
- RV Tangaroa (1991)

=== Survey vessels ===
- SMB Adventure (1998)
- HMNZS Lachlan (F364) (1949–1975)
- HMNZS Manawanui (2019)
- HMNZS Monowai (A06) (1975–1997)
- HMNZS Resolution (A14) (1997-2012)
- HMNZS Takapu (1980–2000)
- HMNZS Tarapunga (1980–2000)
- HMNZS Tui (T234) (1956–1967)
- HMNZS Tui (1970) (1970–1997)

== Nigeria ==
=== Nigerian Navy ===
- NNS Lana (2021)
- NNS Zhizoko (2024)

=== Nigerian Institute for Oceanography and Marine Research ===
- RV Bayagbona (2014)

== Norway ==
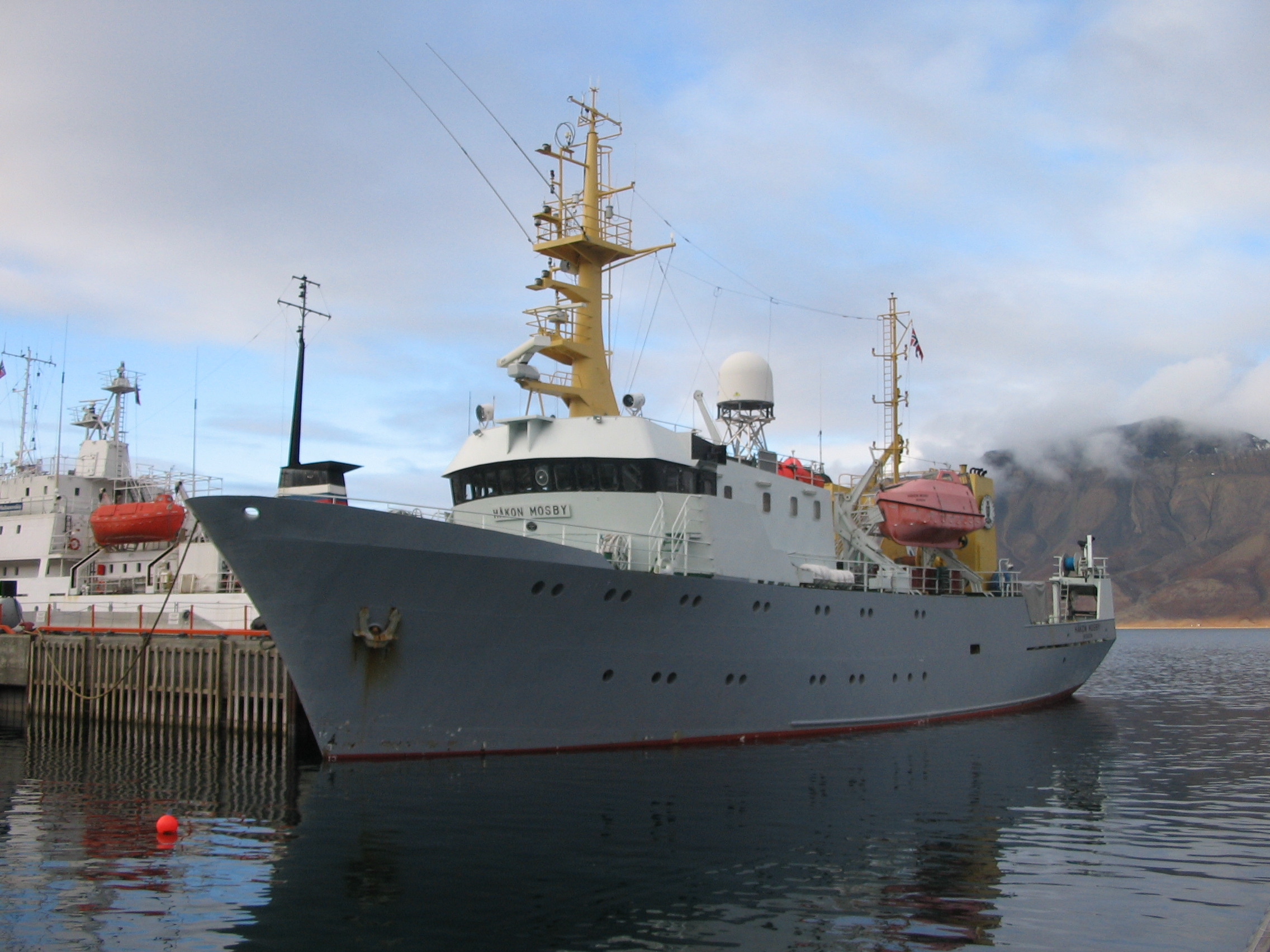
RV Håkon Mosby

- RV G.M. Dannevig
- RV Johan Hjort
- RV Helmer Hanssen (Jan Mayen)
- RV Håkon Mosby
- RV Dr Fridtjof Nansen
- Kronprins Haakon (2018)
- RV Johan Ruud
- RV G.O. Sars
- RV Trygve Braarud
- RV Bjørn Føyn
- RV Lance
- RV Gunnerus

== Oman ==
- RV Al-Jamiah

== Pakistan ==
- PNS Behr Paima

== Peru ==
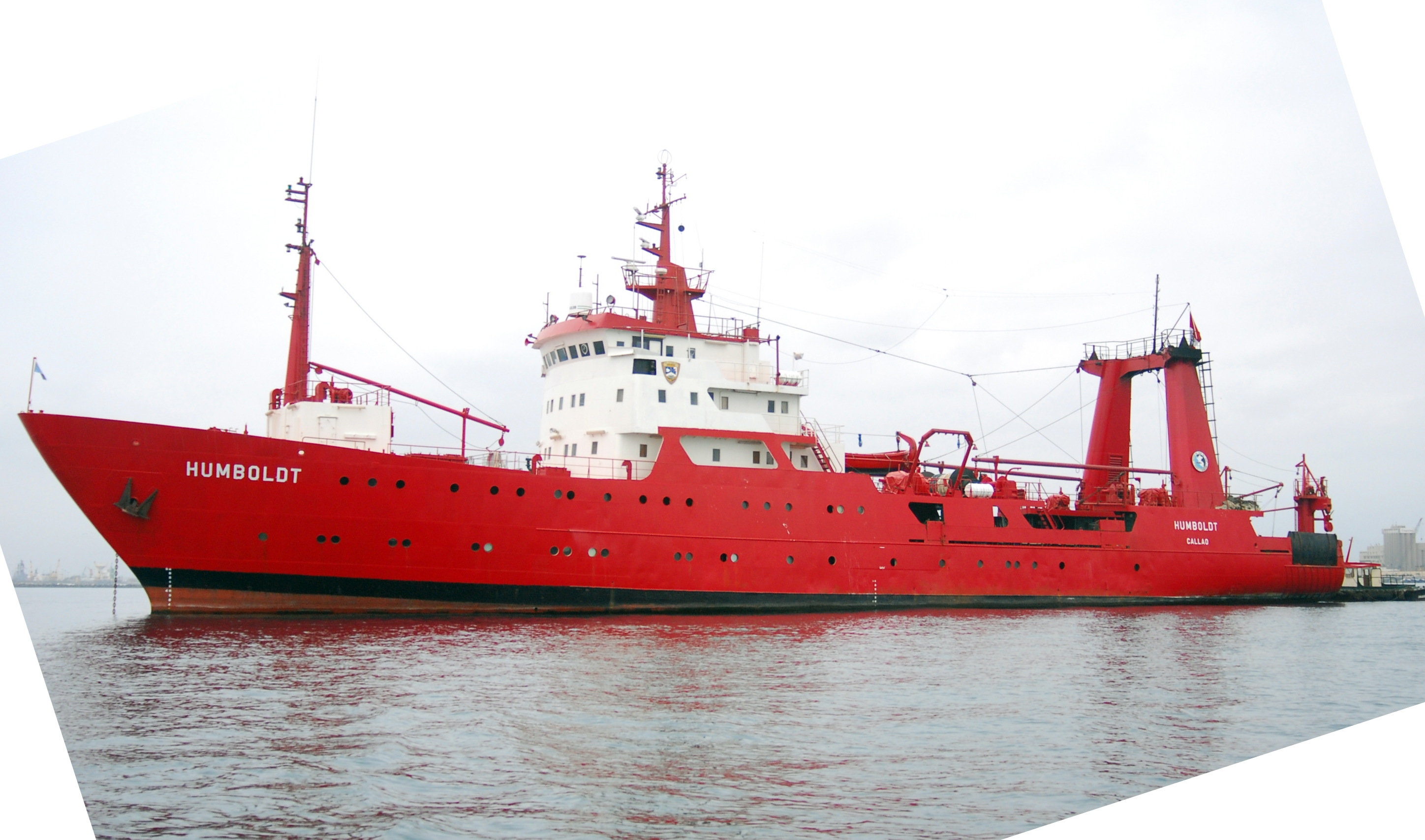
BIC Humboldt

- BIC Humboldt (1978)
- BAP Carrasco (2017)
- BIC Olaya
- BIC Flores

== Philippines ==
- BRP Fort San Antonio (AM-700)
- BRP Fort Abad (AM-701)
- MV DA BFAR
- BRP Gregorio Velasquez (AGR 702)

== Poland (EU) ==
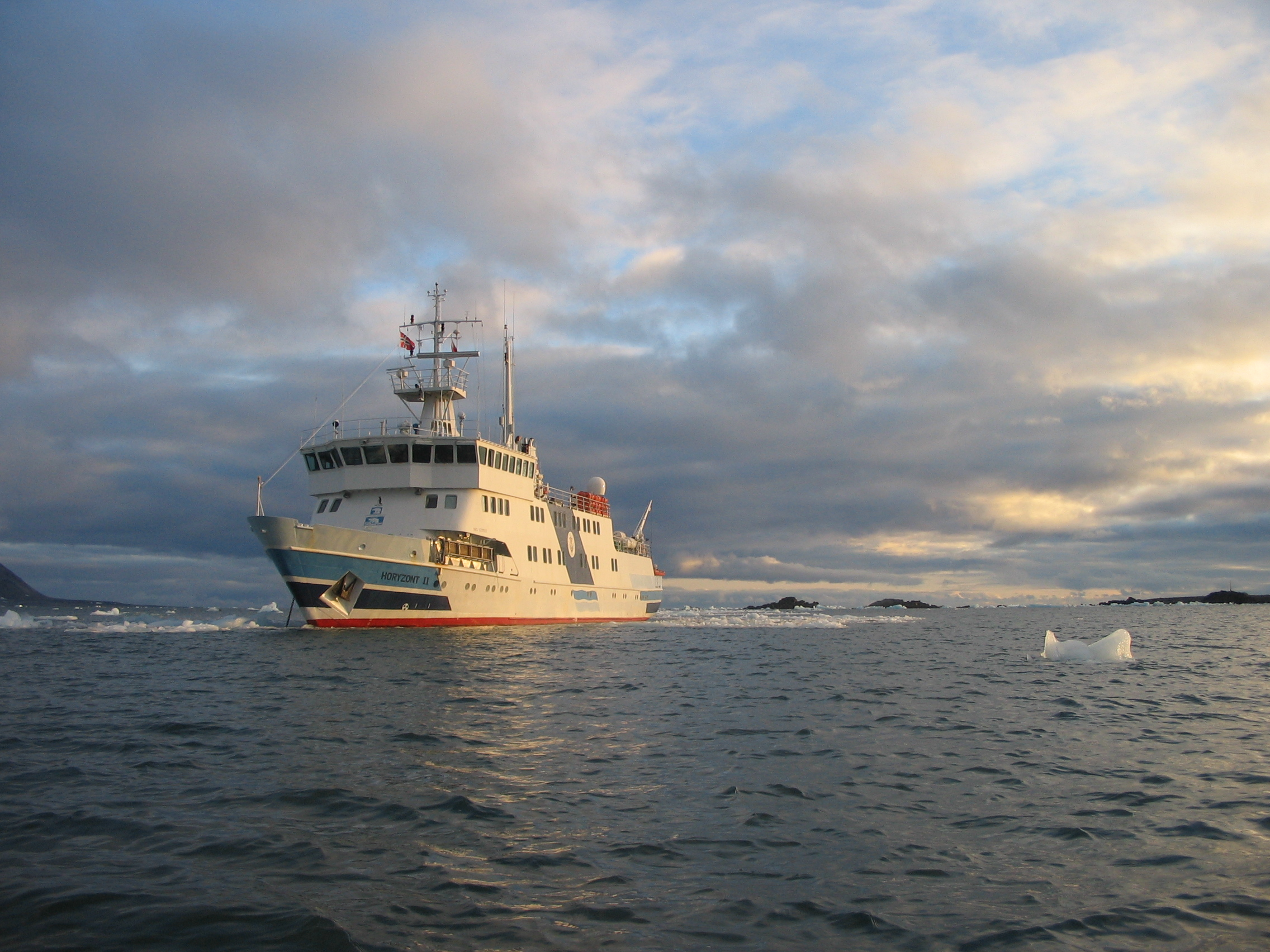
MS Horyzont II

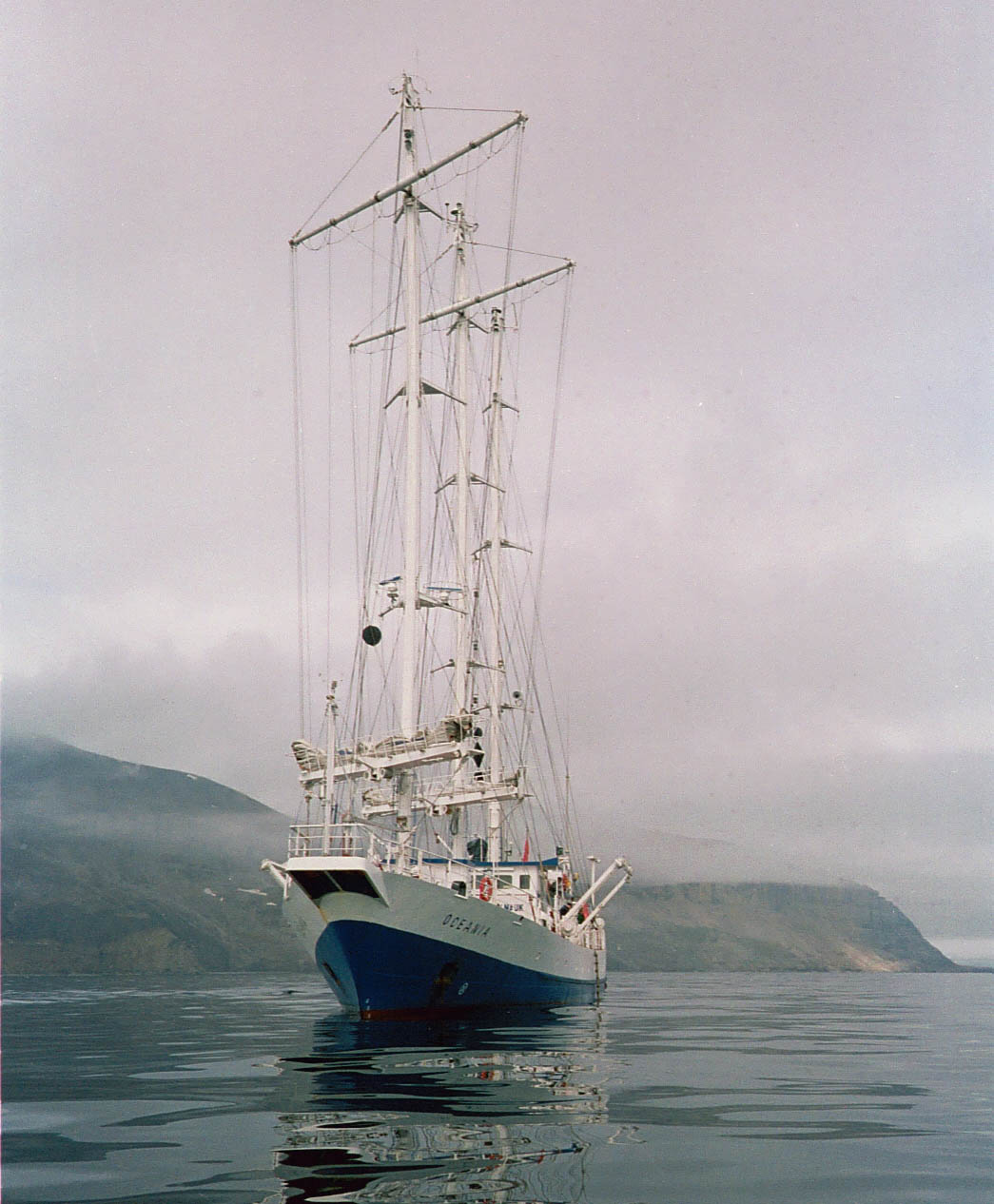
RV Oceania

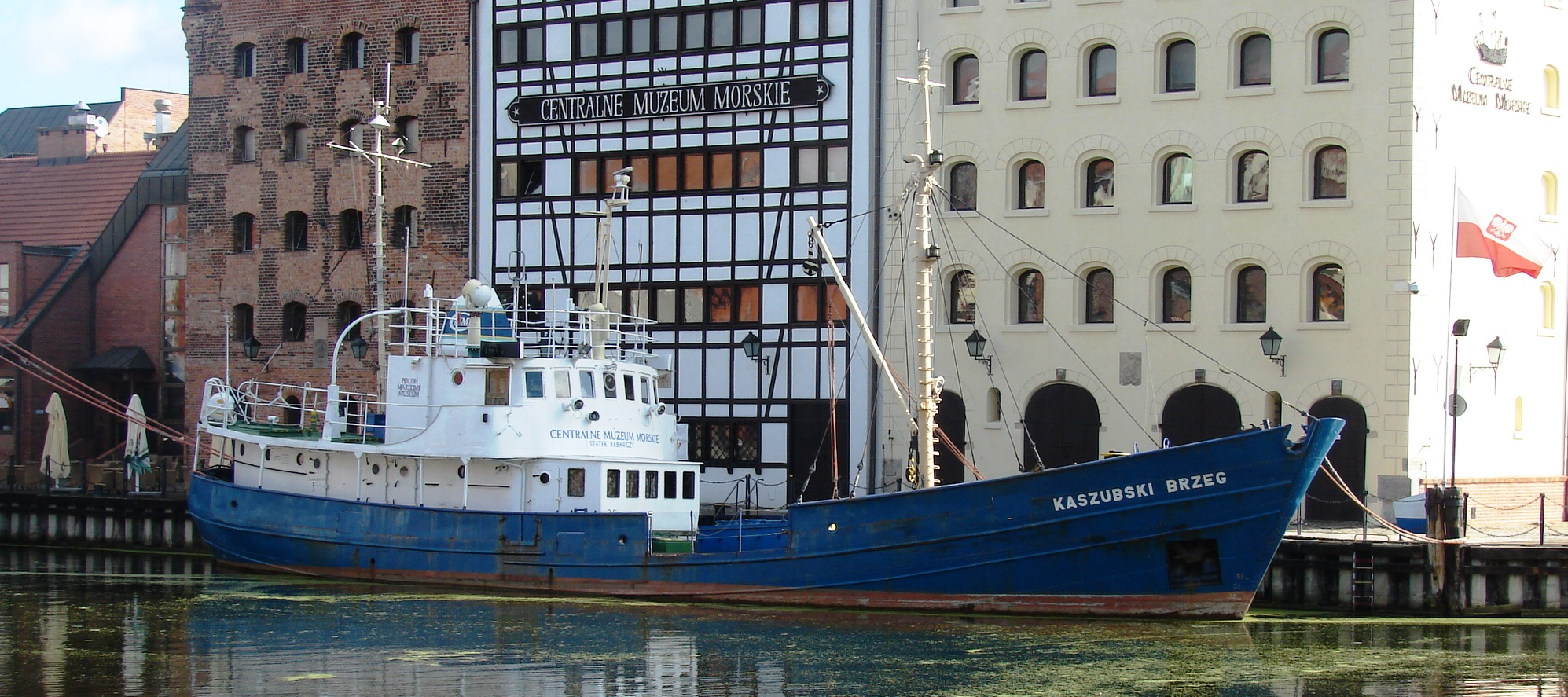
RV Kaszubski Brzeg

- RV Birkut (retired)
- RV Doktor Lubecki (retired)
- RV Hydromet (retired)
- ORP Planeta (retired)
- RV Pomorzanin (retired)
- RV Professor Bogucki (retired)
- RV Wieczno (retired)
- ORP Zodiak (retired)

=== Polish Academy of Sciences ===
- RV Oceania

=== National Marine Fisheries Research Institute ===
- RV Ewa (1928-1939)
- RV Profesor Siedlecki (1974-1992)
- RV Baltica (1993)

=== University of Gdańsk ===
- RV Oceanograf 1
- RV Oceanograf 2

=== Gdynia Maritime University ===
- MS Horyzont II
- RV IMOR

=== Maritime University of Szczecin ===
- MS Nawigator XXI

=== National Maritime Museum, Gdańsk ===
- RV Kaszubski Brzeg (1984-2007)

=== Survey vessels ===
- ORP Arctowski
- ORP Heweliusz
- ORP Kopernik

== Portugal (EU) ==
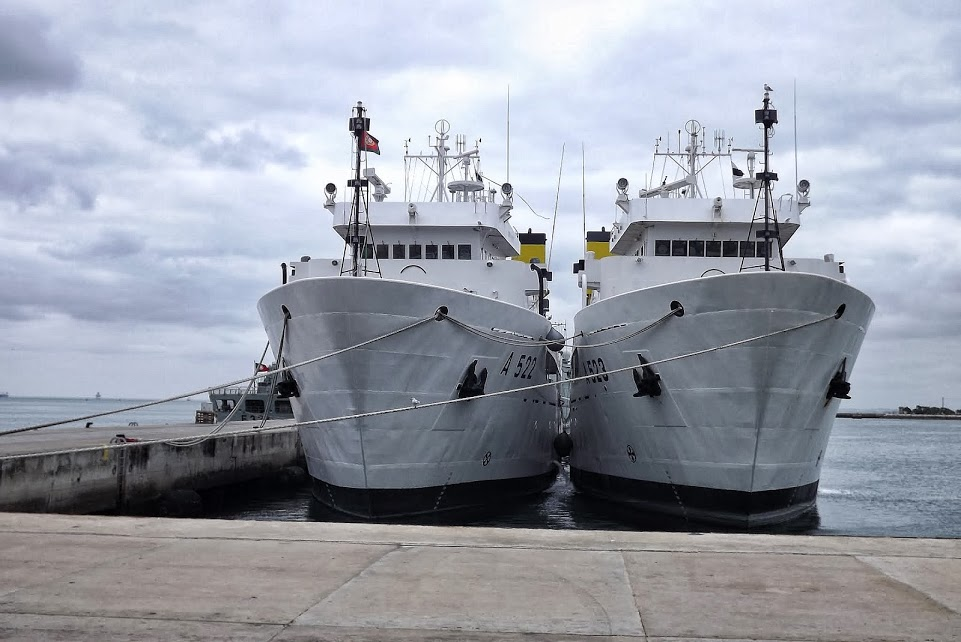
NRP Dom Carlos I & NRP Almirante Gago Coutinho

=== Portuguese Navy ===
- NRP Dom Carlos I
- NRP Almirante Gago Coutinho
- NRP Andrómeda
- NRP Auriga
- NRP Almeida Carvalho (1972-2002)

=== Portuguese Institute of the Sea and the Atmosphere ===
- NI Mário Ruivo
- NI Noruega
- NI Diplodus
- NI Tellina (2003-2019)
- NI Capricórnio (1994-2008)

=== University of Azores ===
- NI Arquipélago

== Romania (EU) ==
- Istros
- RV Mare Nigrum
- REXDAN Research Vessel

== Saudi Arabia ==
=== King Abdullah University of Science and Technology ===
- RV Thuwal II (2026)

== Senegal ==
- ITAF DEME (2021)

== Soviet Union/Russia ==
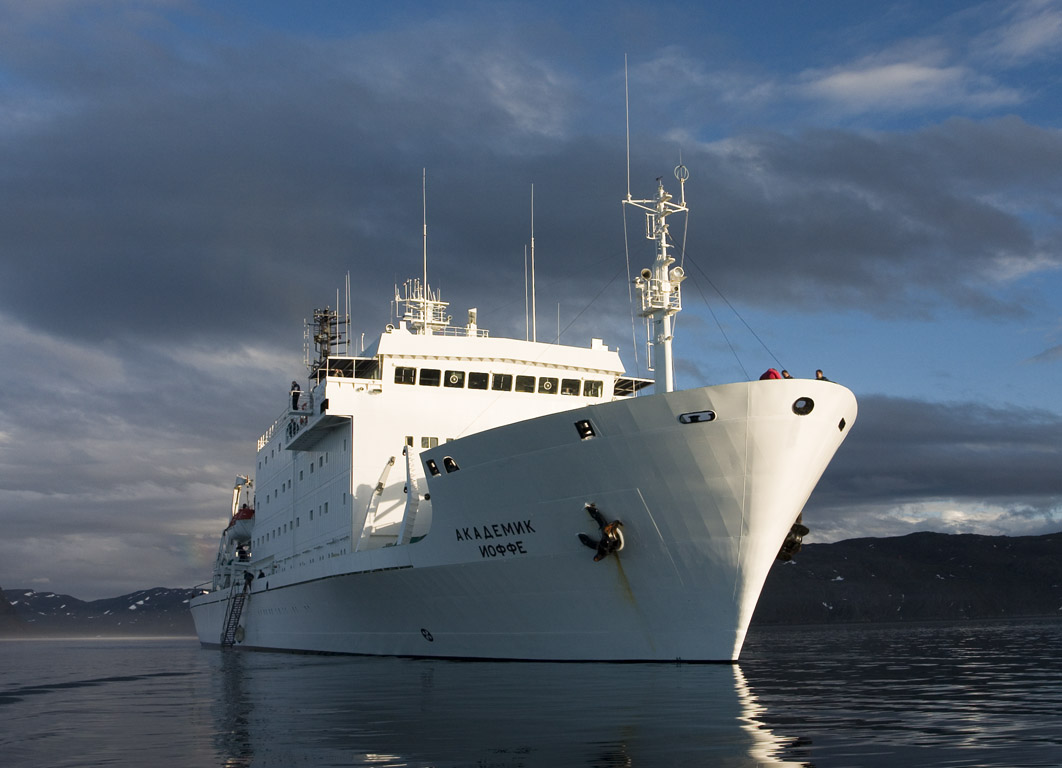
RV Akademik Ioffe

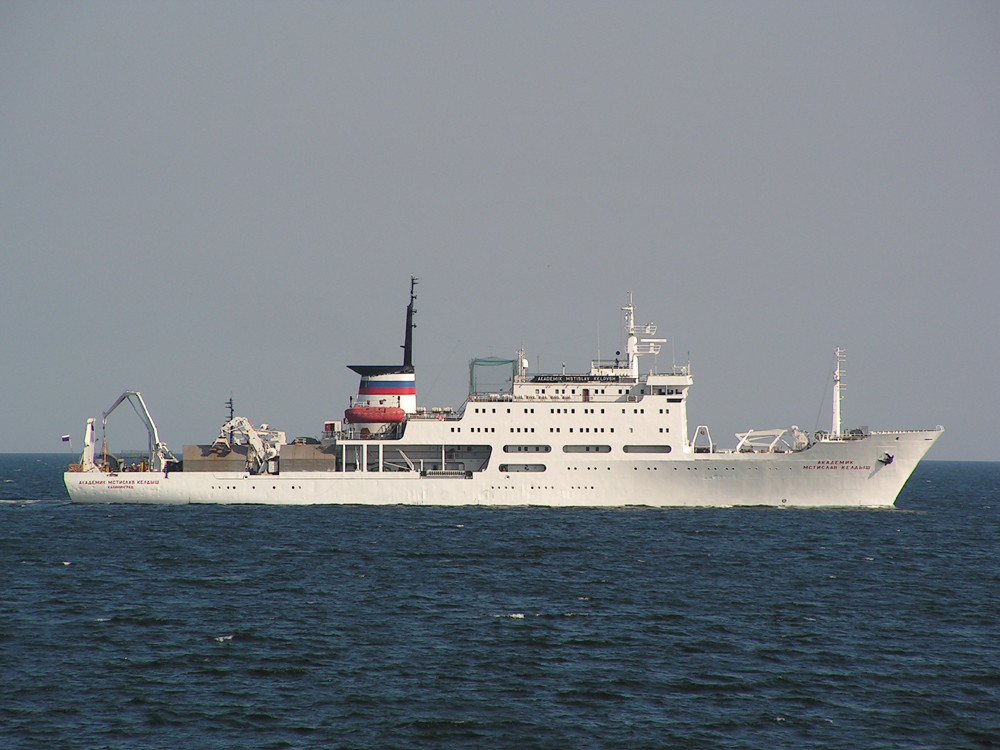
RV Akademik Mstislav Keldysh

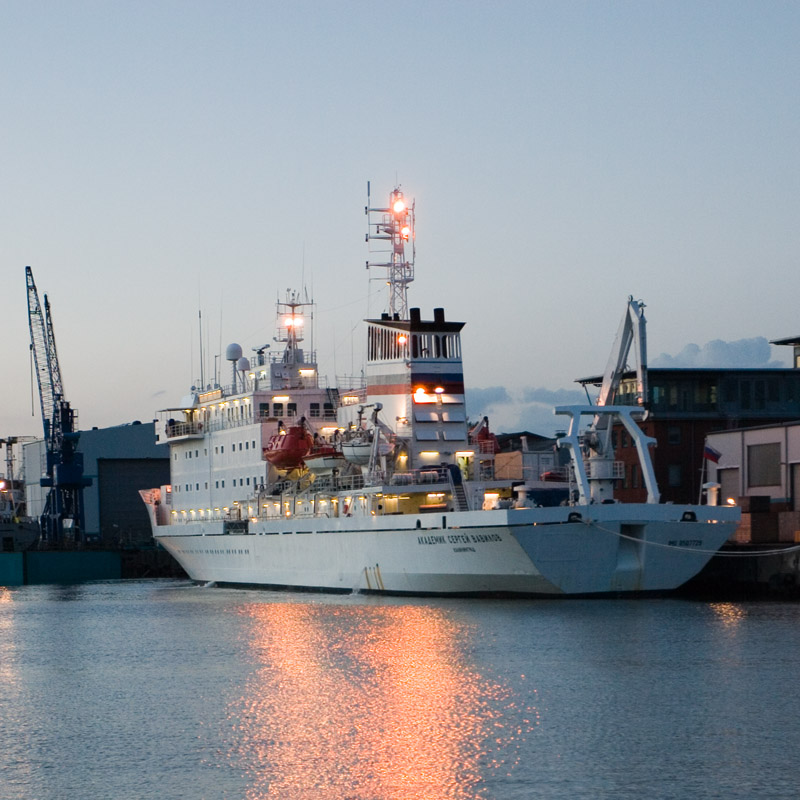
RV Akademik Sergey Vavilov

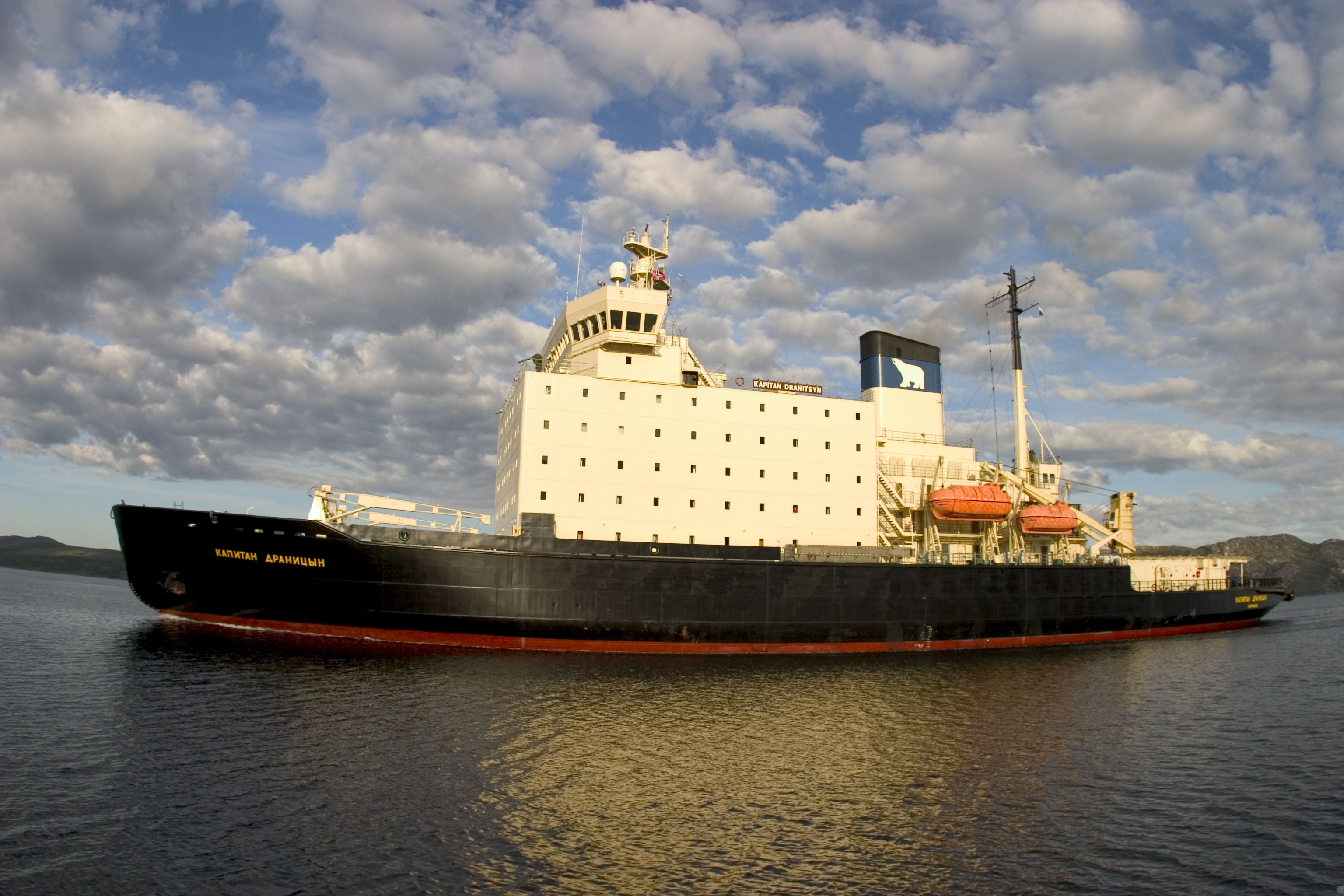
RV Kapitan Dranitsyn

- RV Akademik A. Karpinsky (1984)
- RV Akademik Boris Petrov
- RV Akademik Fersman
- RV Akademik Fyodorov (1987)
- RV Akademik Ioffe
- RV Akademik Lazarev
- RV Akademik M.A.Lavrentyev
- RV Akademik Mstislav Keldysh (1981)
- RV Akademik Nemchinov
- RV Akademik Nikolay Strakhov
- RV Akademik Oparin
- RV Akademik Sergey Vavilov (1988)
- RV Akademik Shatskiy
- RV Akademik Shokalskiy (1982)
- RV Alexey Maryshev
- RV Anatoliy Zhilinskiy
- RV Atlantida
- RV Atlantniro
- RV Atlas
- RV Bar
- RV Belomor
- RV Dalniye Zelentsy
- RV Dmitriy Ovtsyn
- RV Dmitry Peskov
- RV Fritiof Nansen
- RV Gelendzhik
- RV Geo Arctic
- RV Geofizik
- RV Geolog Dmitriy Nalivkin
- RV Gidrobiolog
- RV Grigoriy Mikheyev
- RV Iskatel-5
- RV Ivan Kireyev
- RV Ivan Kruzenshtern
- RV Ivan Petrov
- RV Jakov Smirnitskiy
- RV Kapitan Dranitsyn (1980)
- RV Kol'skaja
- RV Mikhail Verbitskiy
- RV Mirazh
- RV Pavel Gordienko
- RV Priboy
- RV Professor Bogorov
- RV Professor Gagarinskiy
- RV Professor Kaganovskiy
- RV Professor Khromov
- RV Professor Kurentsov
- RV Professor Logachev
- RV Professor Multanovskyi
- RV Professor Polshkov
- RV Professor Rjabinkin
- RV Professor Vodyanitsky
- RV Professor Shtokman
- RV Professor Vladimir Kuztensov
- RV Petr Kottsov
- RV Rift
- RV Semyon Dezhnev
- RV Sergey Kravkov
- RV Taimyr
- RV Tor
- RV Viktor Buynitskiy
- RV Vladimir Sukhoskiyv
- RV Vyacheslav Frolov
- RV Yakov Smirnitskiy
- RV Yuzhmorgeologiya
- RV Zapolyarjye

=== Decommissioned ===
- RV Akademik Aleksandr Nesmeyanov (decommissioned)
- RV Akademik Aleksandr Sidorenko (decommissioned)
- RV Akademik Korolyov (decommissioned)
- RV Akademik Kovalevskiy (decommissioned)
- RV Akademik Kurchatov (decommissioned)
- RV Akademik Vernadskiy (decommissioned)
- RV Akvanavt (decommissioned)
- RV Aleksei Chirikov (decommissioned)
- RV Amur (decommissioned)
- RV Andrei Vilkitzky (decommissioned)
- RV Arktika (decommissioned)
- RV Artemida (decommissioned)
- RV Atmosfera (decommissioned)
- RV Boris Davidov (decommissioned)
- RV Briz (decommissioned)
- RV Buran (decommissioned)
- RV Dmitriy Mendeleev (decommissioned)
- RV Eduard Tolly (decommissioned)
- RV Faddey Bellinsgausen (decommissioned)
- RV Fyodor Matisen (decommissioned)
- RV Fyodor Litke (decommissioned)
- RV Gals (decommissioned)
- RV Gidrolog (decommissioned)
- RV Gidrofizik (decommissioned)
- RV Gigrometr (decommissioned)
- RV Glubina (decommissioned)
- RV Groza (decommissioned)
- RV Ikhtiandr (decommissioned)
- RV Impuls (decommissioned)
- RV Kompas (decommissioned)
- RV Leonid Morozov (decommissioned)
- RV Lugovoe (decommissioned)
- RV Mangazeya (decommissioned)
- RV Metan (decommissioned)
- RV Mikhail Lomonosov (decommissioned)
- RV Miklukho Maklay (decommissioned)
- RV Murmanskaja (decommissioned)
- RV Nikolay Yevgenov (decommissioned)
- RV Okean (decommissioned)
- RV Odissey (decommissioned)
- RV Pamyat Merkuriya (decommissioned)
- RV Pavel Bashmakov (decommissioned)
- RV Persey (1922 to 1941, the first Soviet research vessel)
- RV Pomor (decommissioned)
- RV Priliv (decommissioned)
- RV Professor Molchanov (decommissioned)
- RV Professor Zubov (decommissioned)
- RV Roumb (decommissioned)
- RV Shelf (decommissioned)
- RV Smolensk (decommissioned)
- RV Tantal (decommissioned)
- RV Vadim Popov (decommissioned)
- RV Valentin Shashin (decommissioned)
- RV Valerian Uryvayev (decommissioned)
- RV Vityaz (III) (retired)
- RV Vityaz (IV) (decommissioned)
- RV Vsevolod Timonov (decommissioned)
- RV Vulkanolog (decommissioned)
- RV Yantar (decommissioned)
- RV Yaroslavets (decommissioned)
- RV Zenit (decommissioned)

== South Africa ==
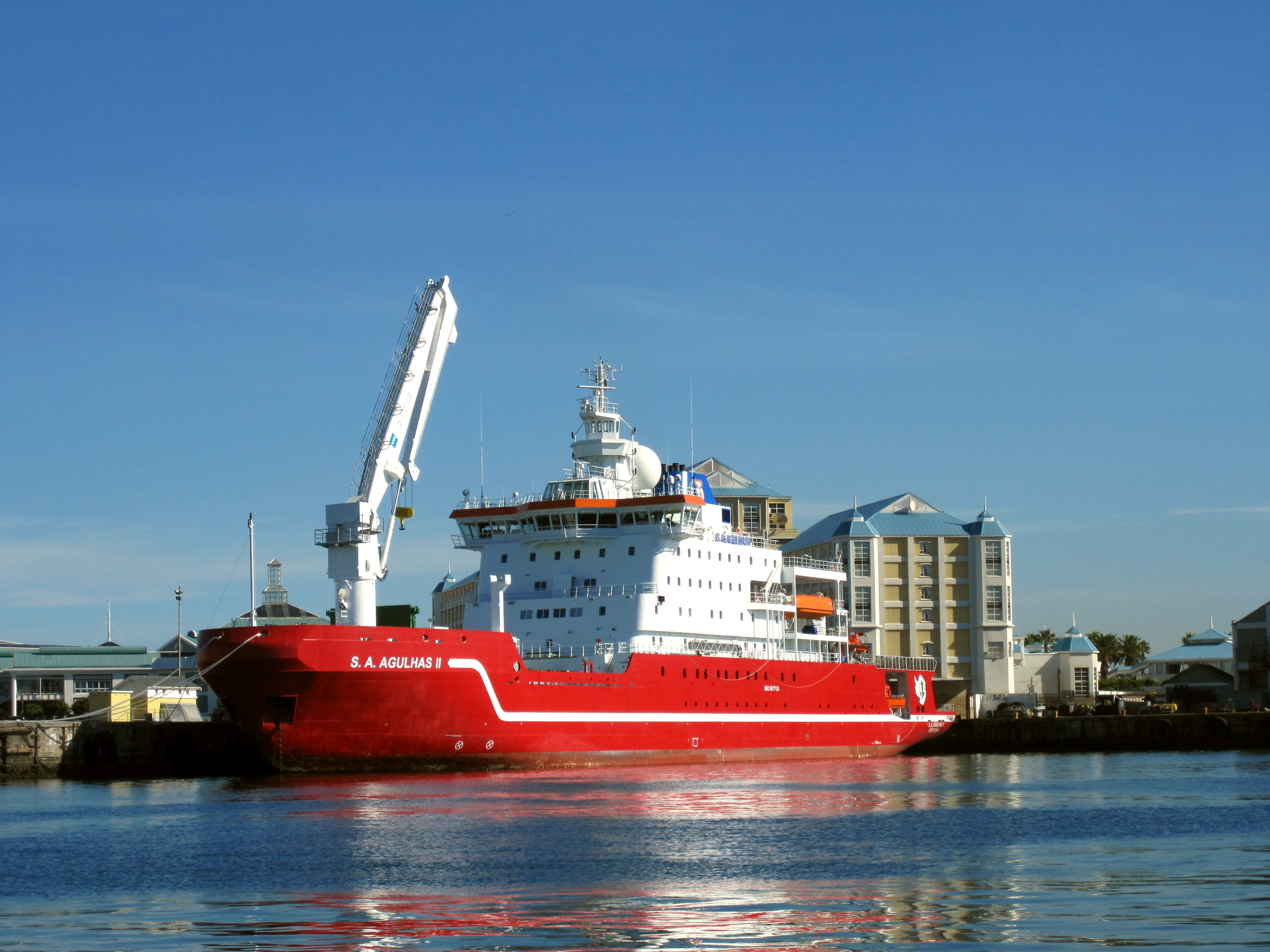
S.A. Agulhas II

- Africana
- S.A. Agulhas
- S.A. Agulhas II
- Ellen Khuzwayo
- RV Observer
- RV Phakisa

=== Survey vessels ===
- SAS Protea (A324)

== Spain (EU) ==
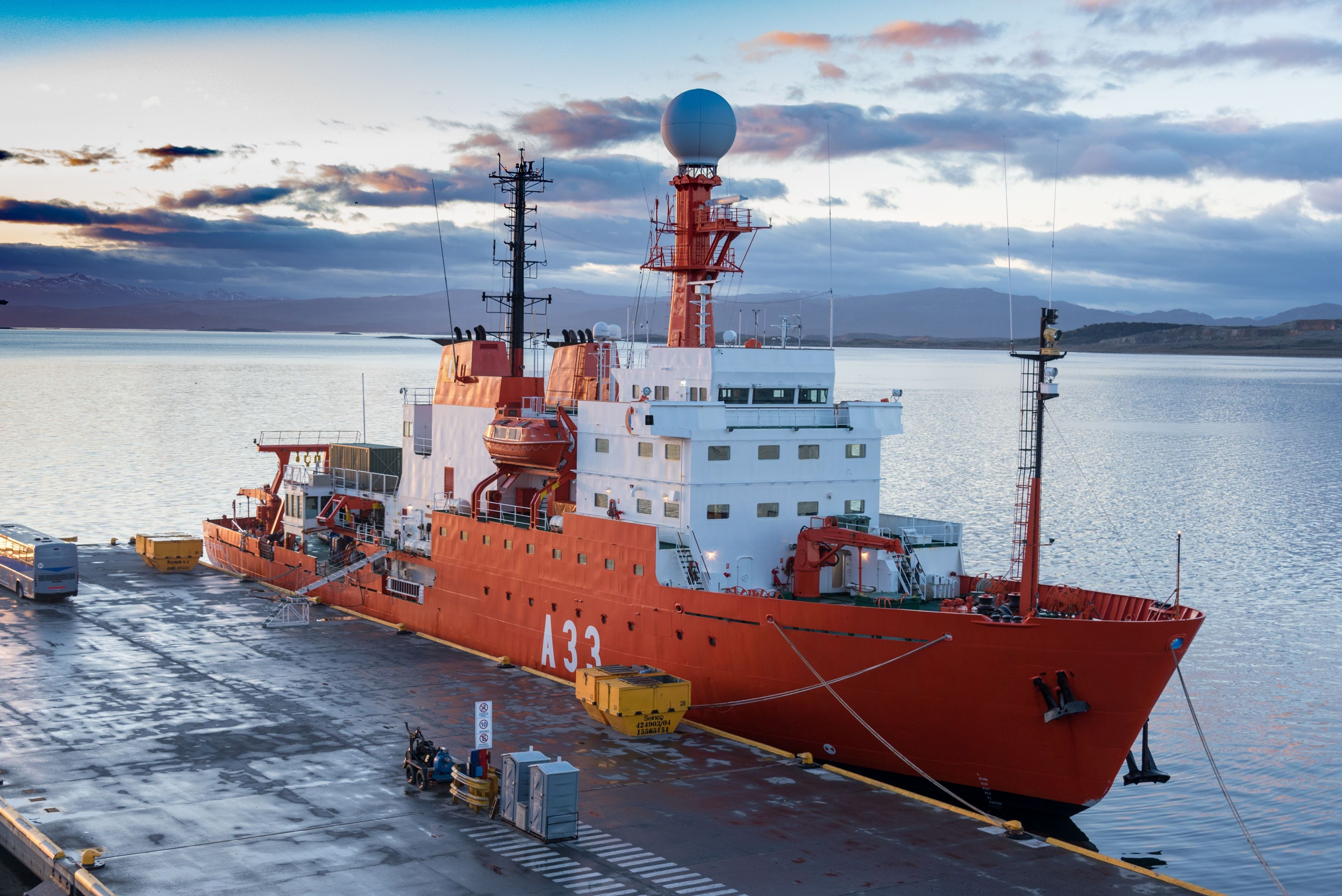
BIO Hesperides

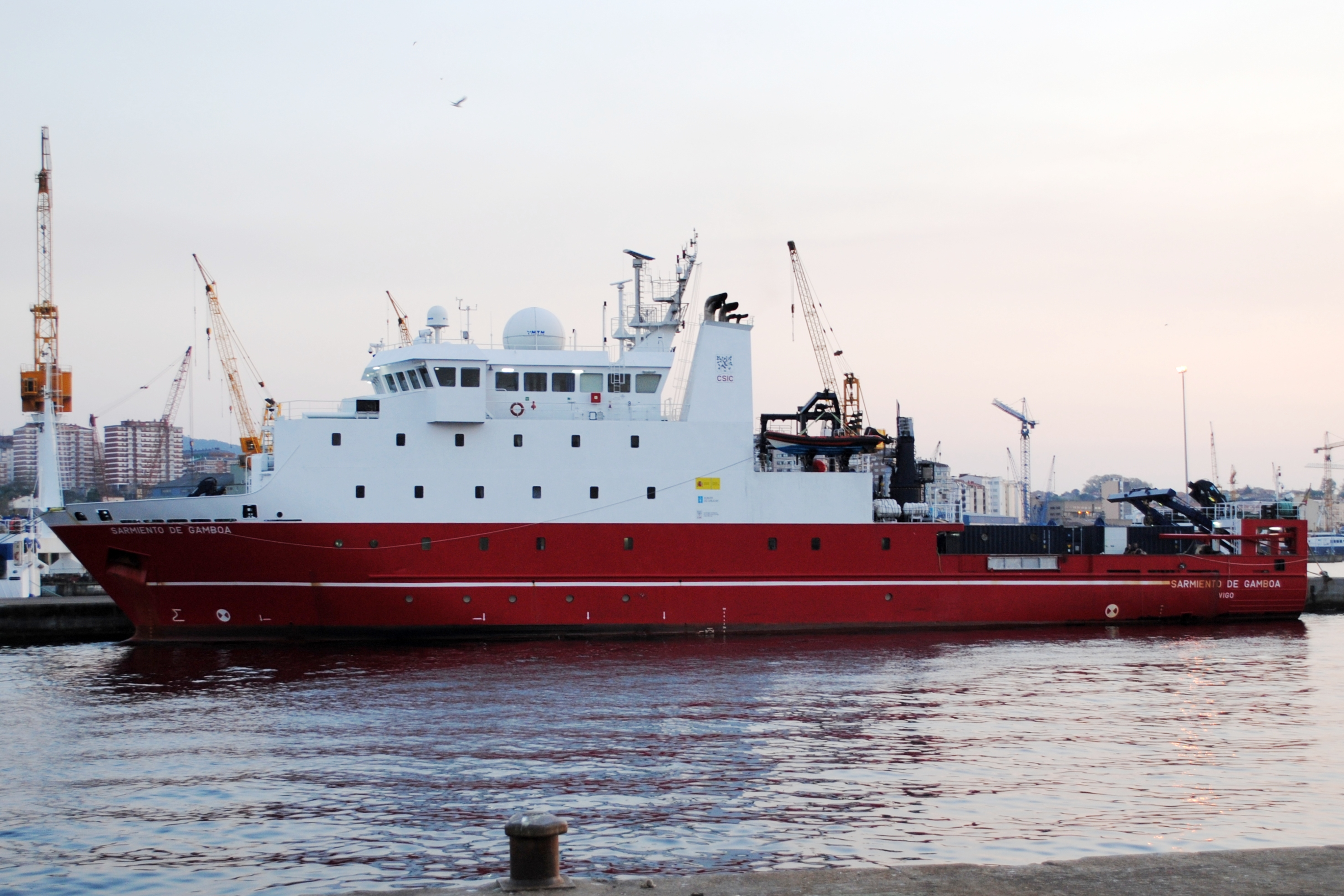
RV Sarmiento de Gamboa

=== Spanish Navy ===
- BIO A-33 Hespérides

=== Spanish National Research Council ===
- RV Sarmiento de Gamboa
- BO Odón de Buen (2024)
- BO García del Cid
- BO Mytilus

=== Instituto Español de Oceanografía ===
- BIO Angeles Alvariño
- BIO Ramón Margalef

=== Secretaría General del Mar ===
- BIO Miguel Oliver
- BIO Intermares
- BIO Emma Bardán

=== Survey vessels ===
- A-23 Antares
- A-24 Rigel
- A-31 Malaspina
- A-32 Tofiño
- A-91 Astrolabio
- A-92 Escándalo

== Sweden (EU) ==
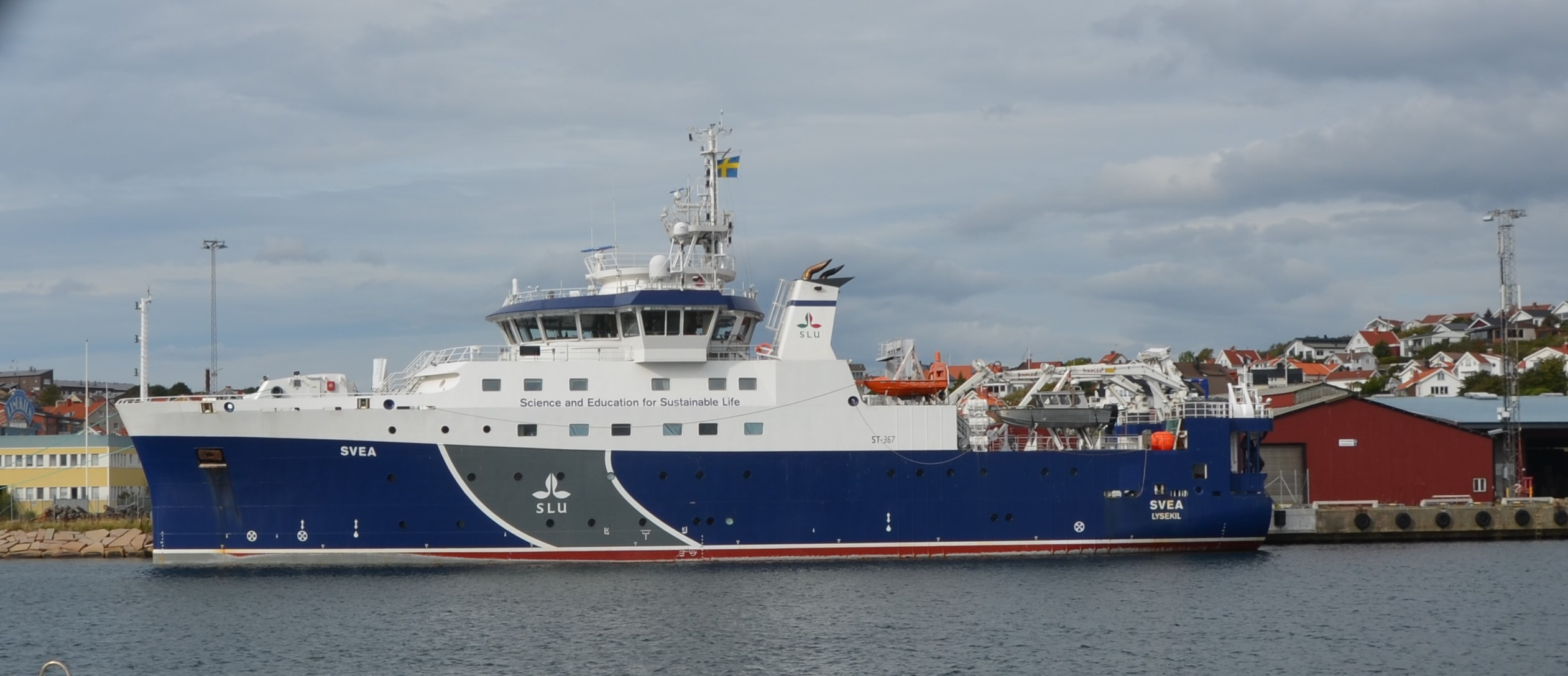
RV Svea

- RV Oscar von Sydow (1976)
- RV Skagerak (1968)
- RV Skagerak (2017; 2021–present)
- RV Svea (2019)
- IB Oden (1988)
- SV Ocean Surveyor (1984)
- R/V Electra af Askö (2016)
- R/V Jacob Hägg (1982)
- R/V Botnica (1989)

== Thailand ==
=== Department of Marine and Coastal Resources ===
- PAKARANG 805
- 807

== Tunisia ==
- RV Hannibal (1998)
- Salammbo (1992)

== Turkey ==
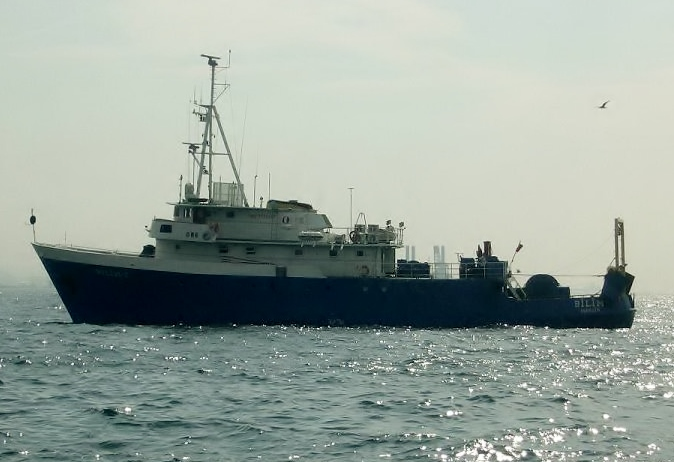
RV Bilim 2

- RV Barbaros Hayreddin Paşa
- RV Beluga
- RV Bilim-2
- RV Denar 2
- RV Derinsu
- RV K. Piri Reis
- RV MTA Oruç Reis
- RV MTA Selen
- RV MTA Sismik 1
- RV MTA Turkuaz
- RV TÜBİTAK Marmara

== Taiwan (Republic of China) ==
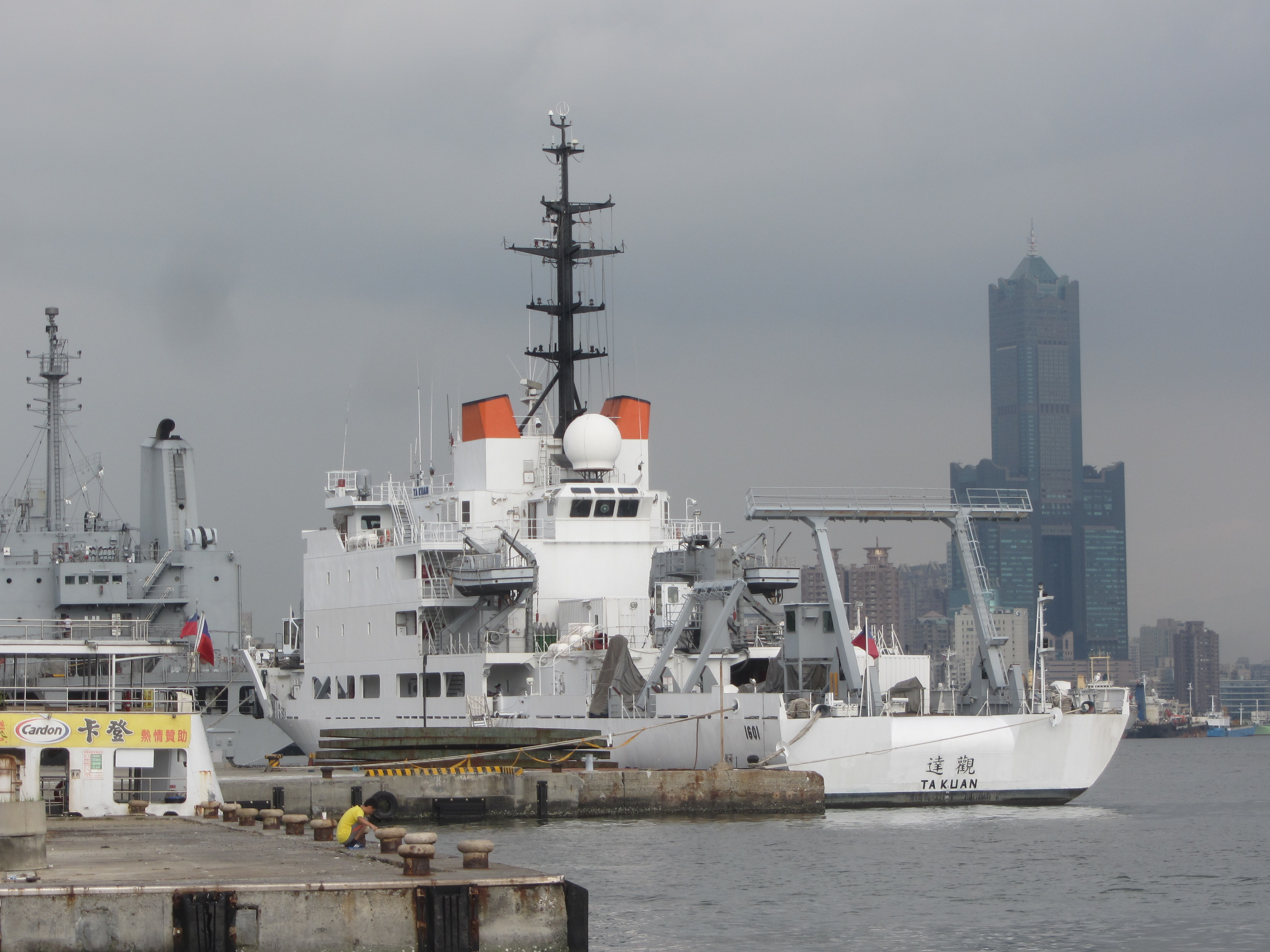
ROCS Ta Kuan

=== Taiwan Ocean Research Institute ===
- RV Legend
- RV Ocean Researcher I (operated by National Taiwan University)
- RV Ocean Researcher II (operated by National Taiwan Ocean University)
- RV Ocean Researcher III (operated by National Sun Yat-sen University)
- RV Ocean Researcher V

=== National Museum of Marine Biology and Aquarium ===
- RV Jiangshu (operated by National Dong Hwa University Graduate Institute of Marine Biology)

=== Republic of China Navy ===
- ROCS Ta Kuan (AGS-1601)

== Ukraine ==
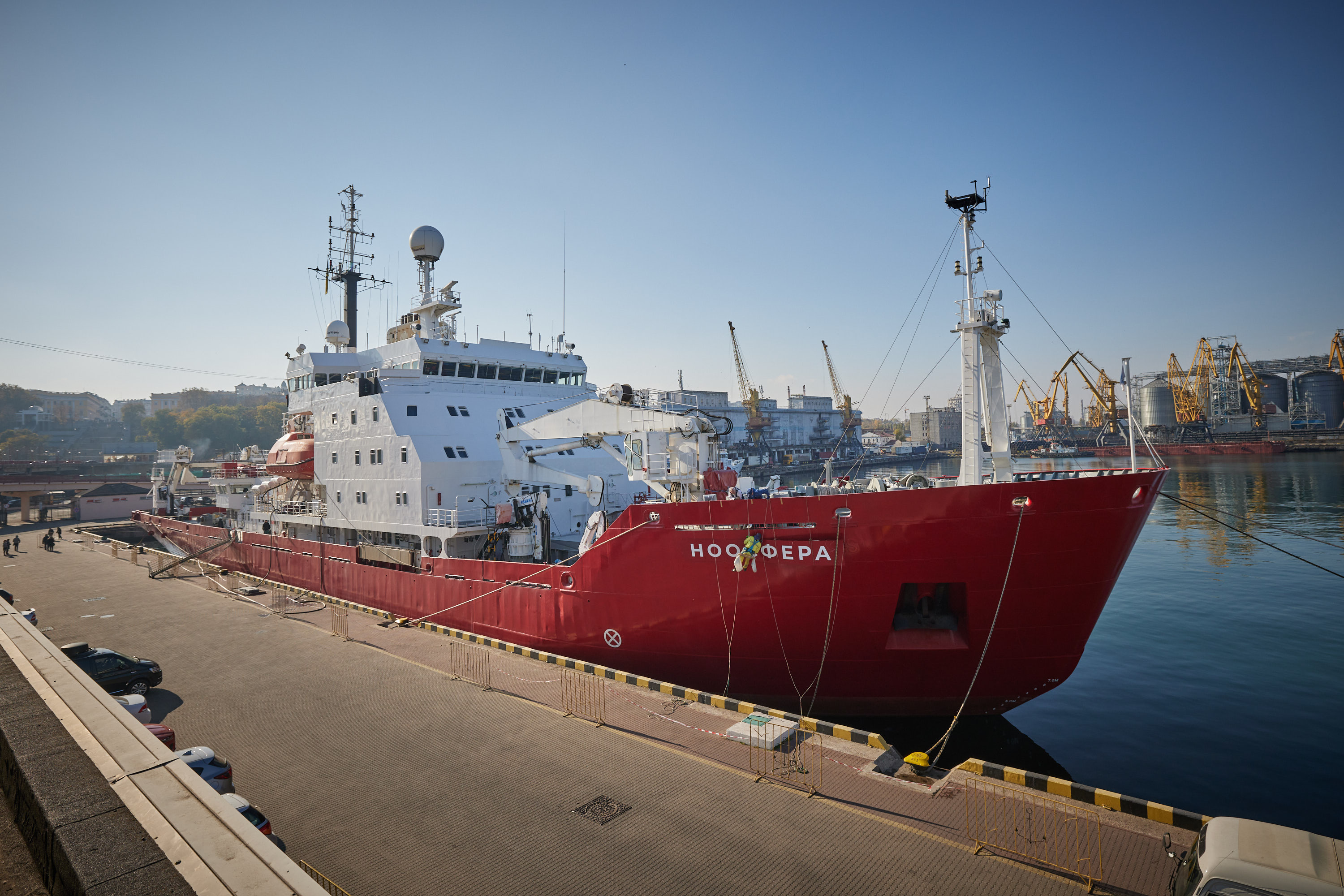
Noosfera

- Borys Aleksandrov
- Noosfera

== UAE ==
- RV Jaywun (2023)

== United Kingdom ==
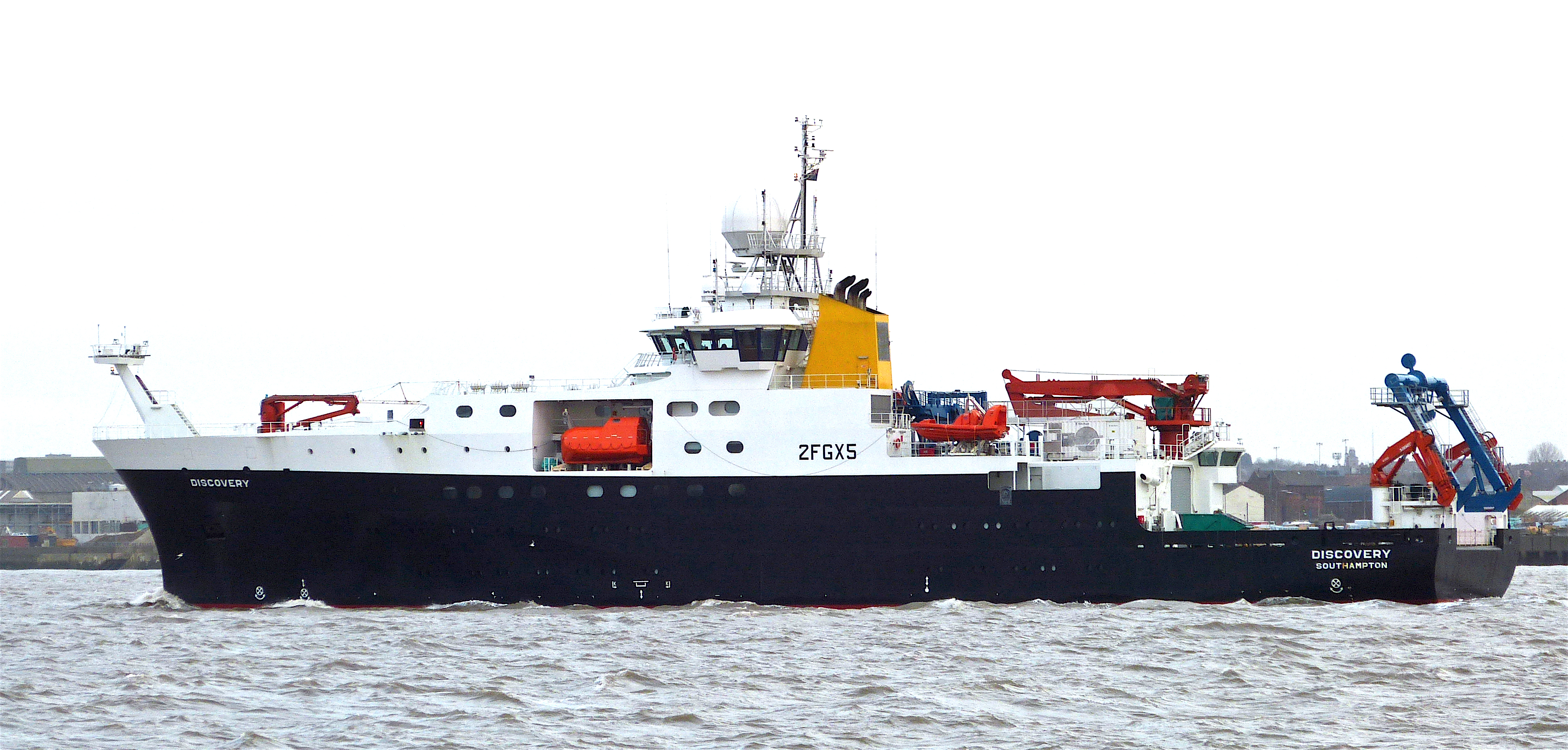
RRS Discovery

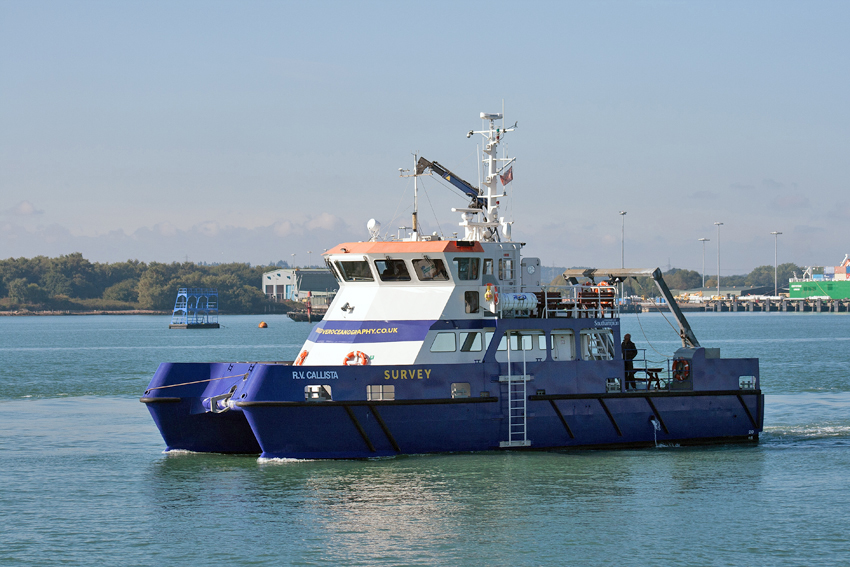
RV Callista

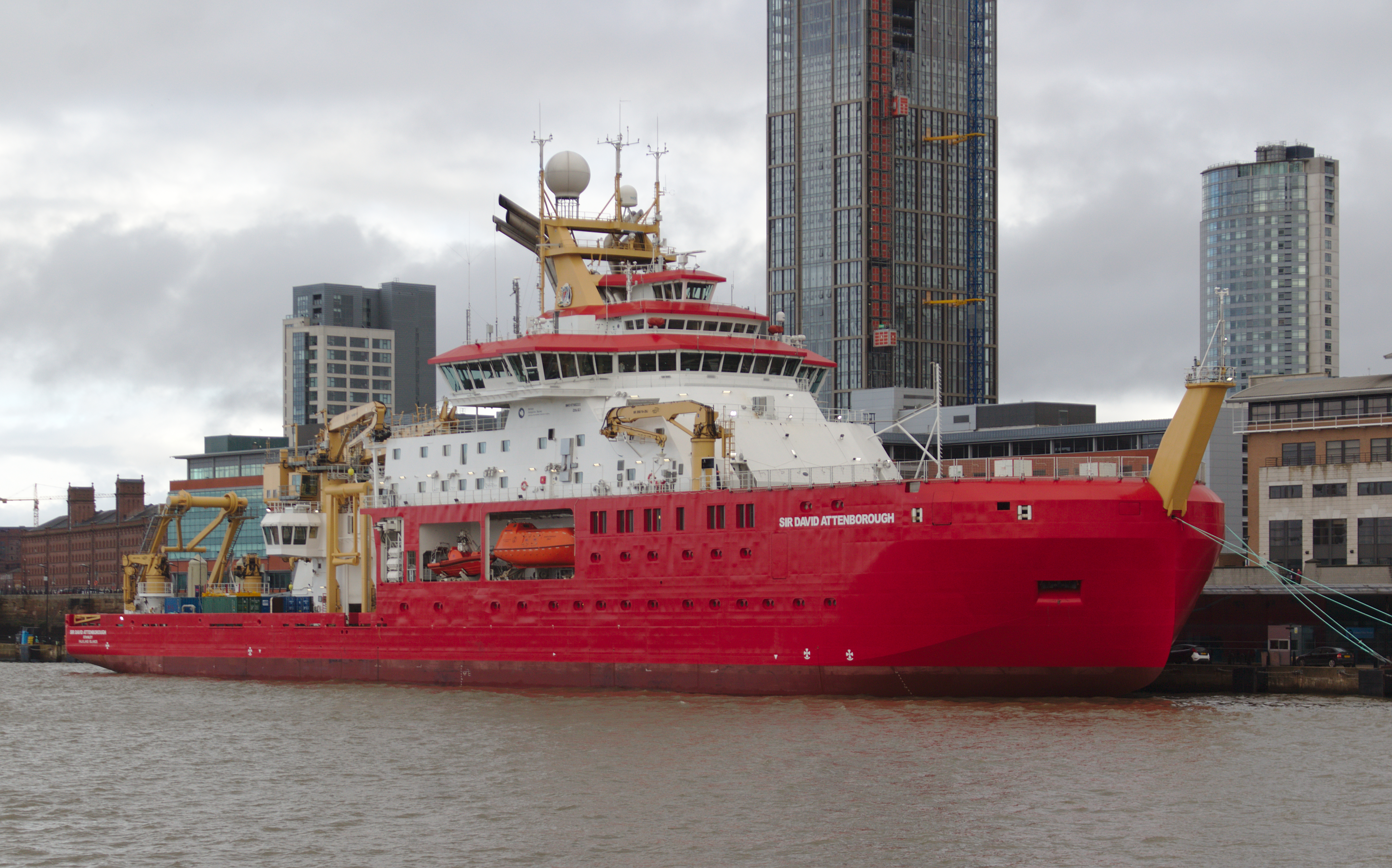
RRS Sir David Attenborough

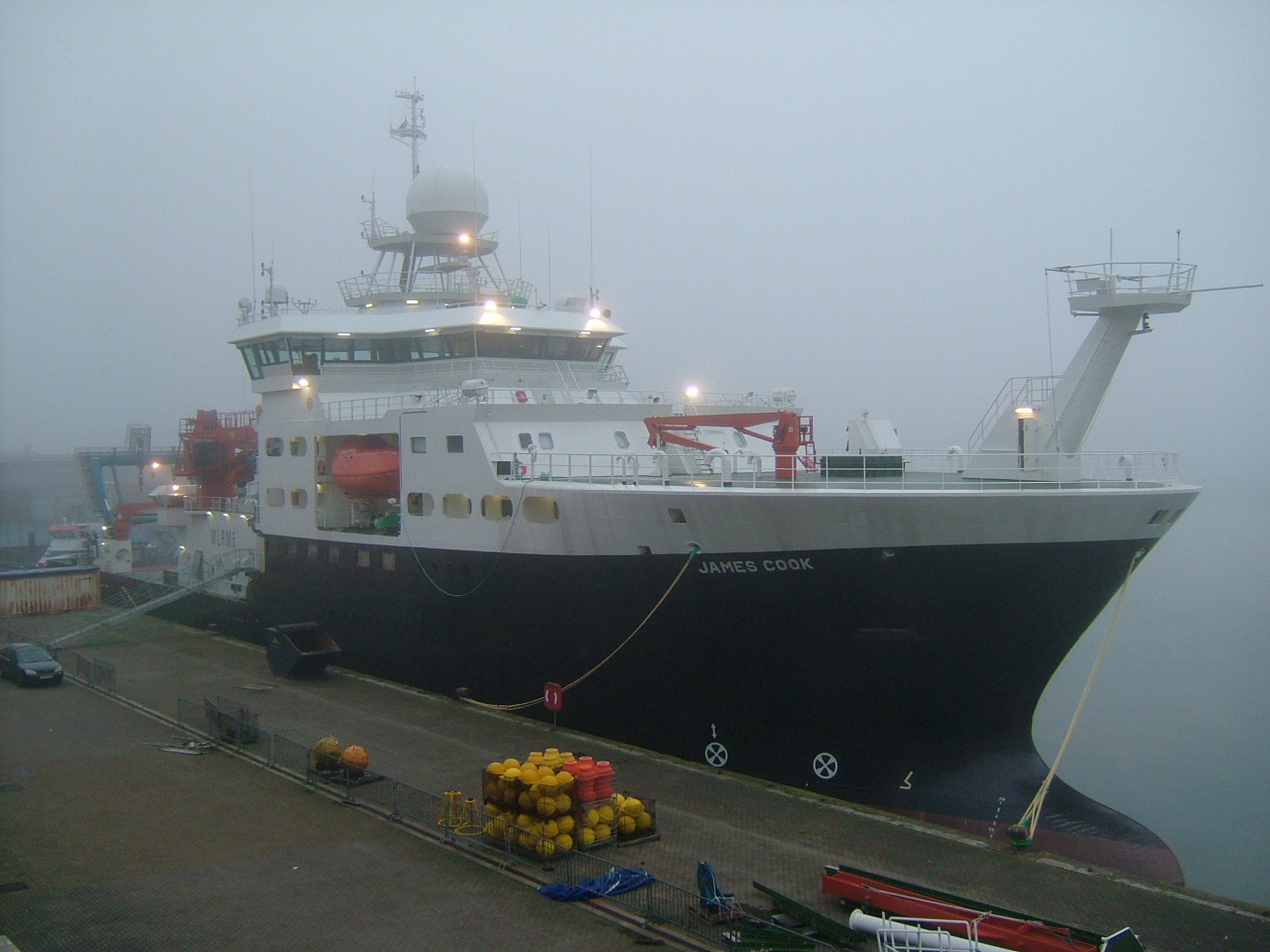
RRS James Cook

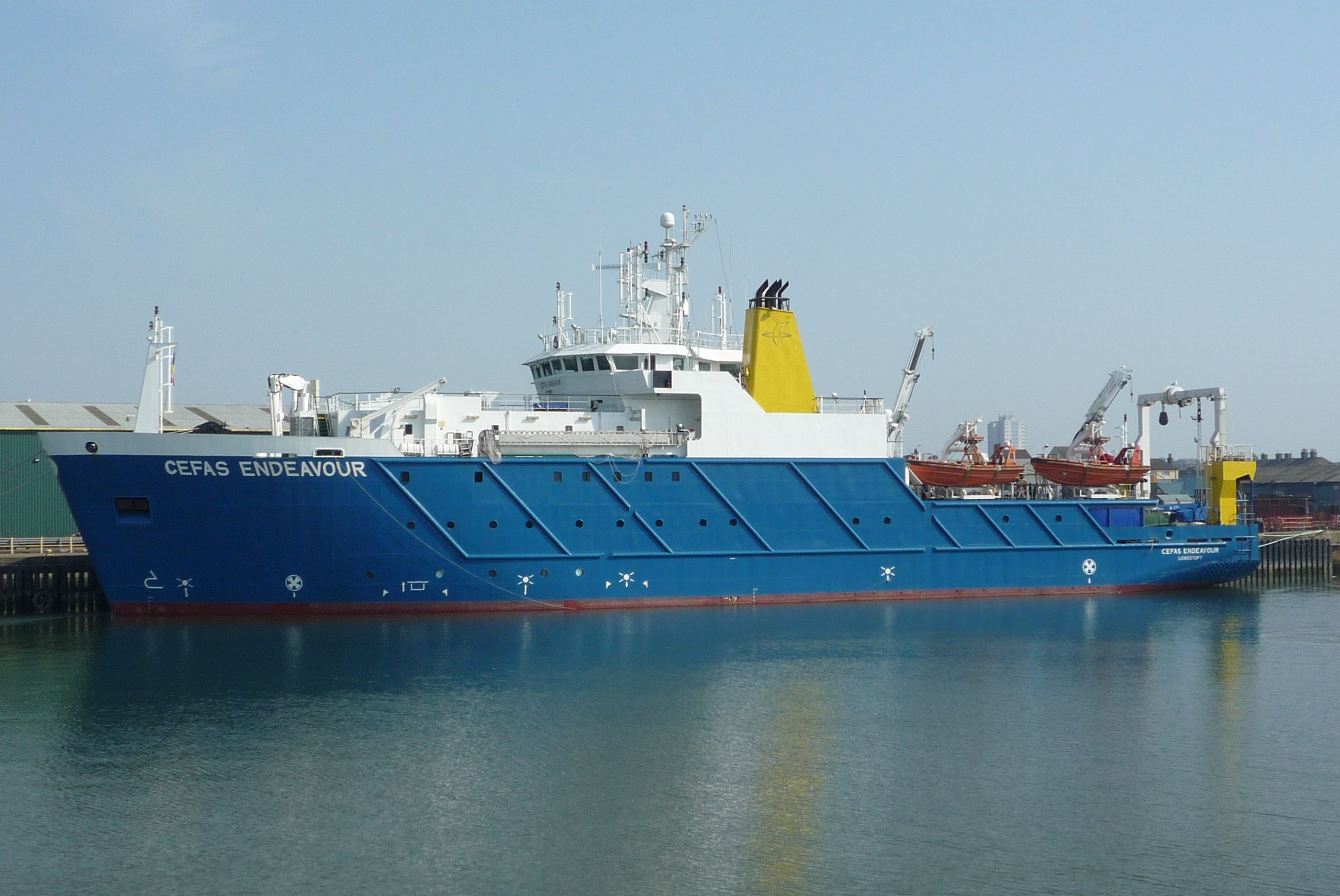
RV Cefas Endeavour

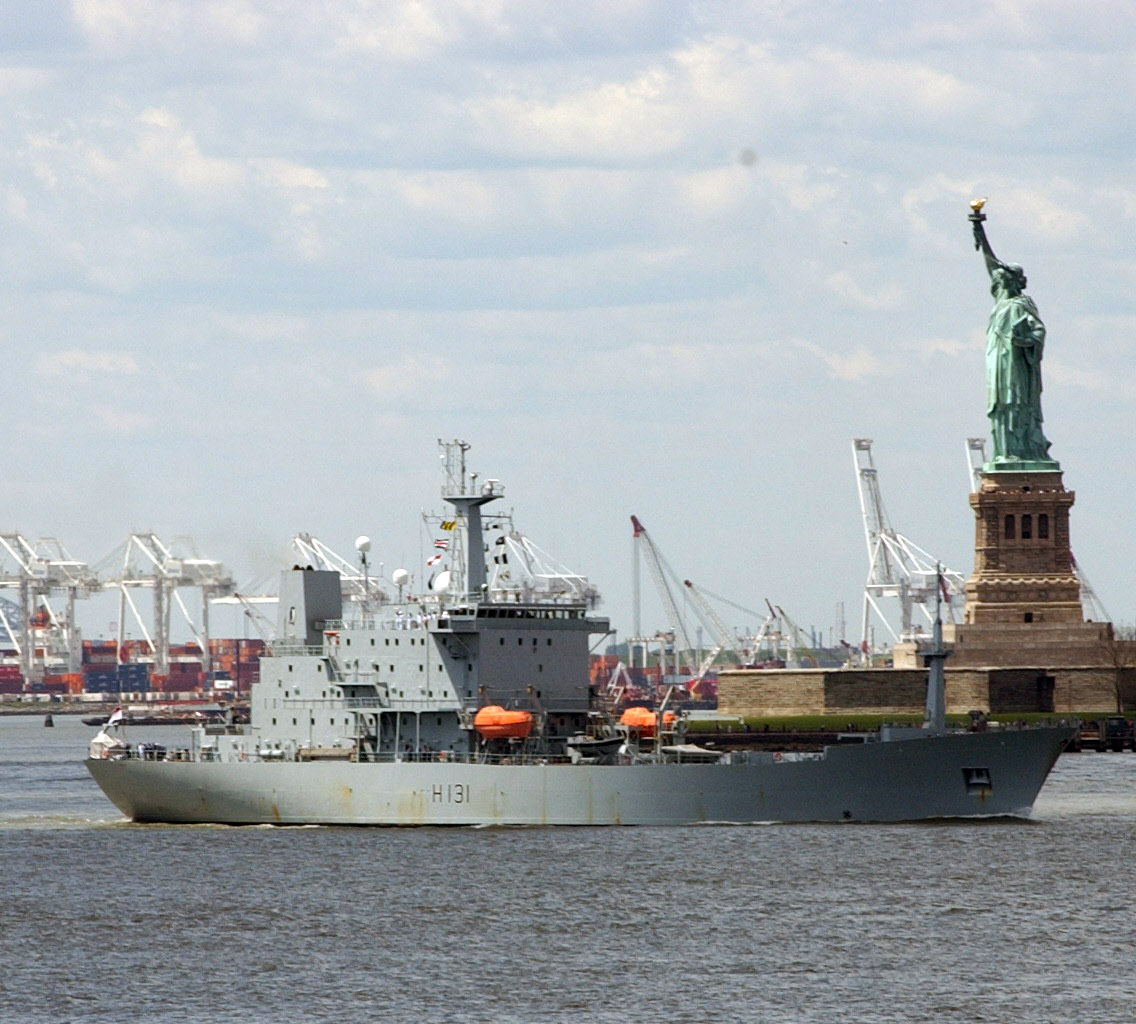
Royal Navy ocean survey vessel HMS Scott.

=== Natural Environment Research Council ===
- RV Sepia Plymouth Marine Laboratory
- RV Squilla Plymouth Marine Laboratory
- RV Tamaris Plymouth Marine Laboratory
- OWS Cumulus (Ocean Weather Ship)

=== National Oceanography Centre, Southampton ===
- RRS Discovery (1962-2012)
- RRS Discovery (2012)
- RRS James Cook
- RV Callista
- RV Bill Conway

=== British Antarctic Survey ===
- RRS James Clark Ross (1990-2021; sold to Ukraine, now Noosfera)
- RRS Ernest Shackleton (1999–2019; sold to Italy, now Laura Bassi)
- RRS Sir David Attenborough (2018)

=== Scottish Association for Marine Science ===
- RV Calanus
- RV Seol Mara

=== Newcastle University ===
- RV The Princess Royal

=== University Marine Biological Station Millport ===
(London & Glasgow Universities)

- RV Aora, now University of Washington, USA
- RV Aplysia

=== Swansea University ===
- RV Noctiluca
- RV Mary Anning

=== Cardiff University ===
- RV Coda Octopus Guiding Light

=== P&O Maritime ===
(Bangor University)

- RV Prince Madog

=== PEML, University of Liverpool ===
- RV Roagan
- RV Marisa of Liverpool

=== Marine Scotland ===
- FRV Alba na Mara
- FRV Scotia

=== Centre for Environment, Fisheries and Aquaculture Science ===
- RV Huxley
- SY Hildegarde
- SY Hiawatha
- RV CEFAS Endeavour (2003)
- RV Cirolana
- RV Clione
- RV Corella
- RV Corystes
- RV Ernest Holt
- RV George Bligh
- SS Joseph & Sarah Miles
- RV Platessa
- RV Sir Lancelot
- RV Tellina

=== Environment Agency ===
(National Marine Service)

- RV Coastal Guardian
- RV Sea Vigil
- RV Vigilance
- RV Water Guardian

=== Agri-Food and Biosciences Institute, Northern Ireland ===
- RV Corystes (replaced RV Lough Foyle)

=== Gardline Geoservices Ltd ===
- RV Coastal Surveyor
- RV Ocean Discovery
- RV Ocean Endeavour
- RV Ocean Observer
- RV Ocean Researcher formerly RRS Charles Darwin
- RV Ocean Seeker
- RV Triton

=== Others ===
- RDV 01 Crystal
- RV Aurora Magnetica
- RV Diablo
- RV Song of the Whale

=== Survey vessels ===
- HMS Scott (Antarctic)
- HMS Protector
- HMS Roebuck (Coastal)
- HMS Gleaner (Coastal)
- HMS Magpie (Inshore)
- HMS Echo (Multi-Role Survey Vessel)
- HMS Enterprise (Multi-Role Survey Vessel)

== United States ==
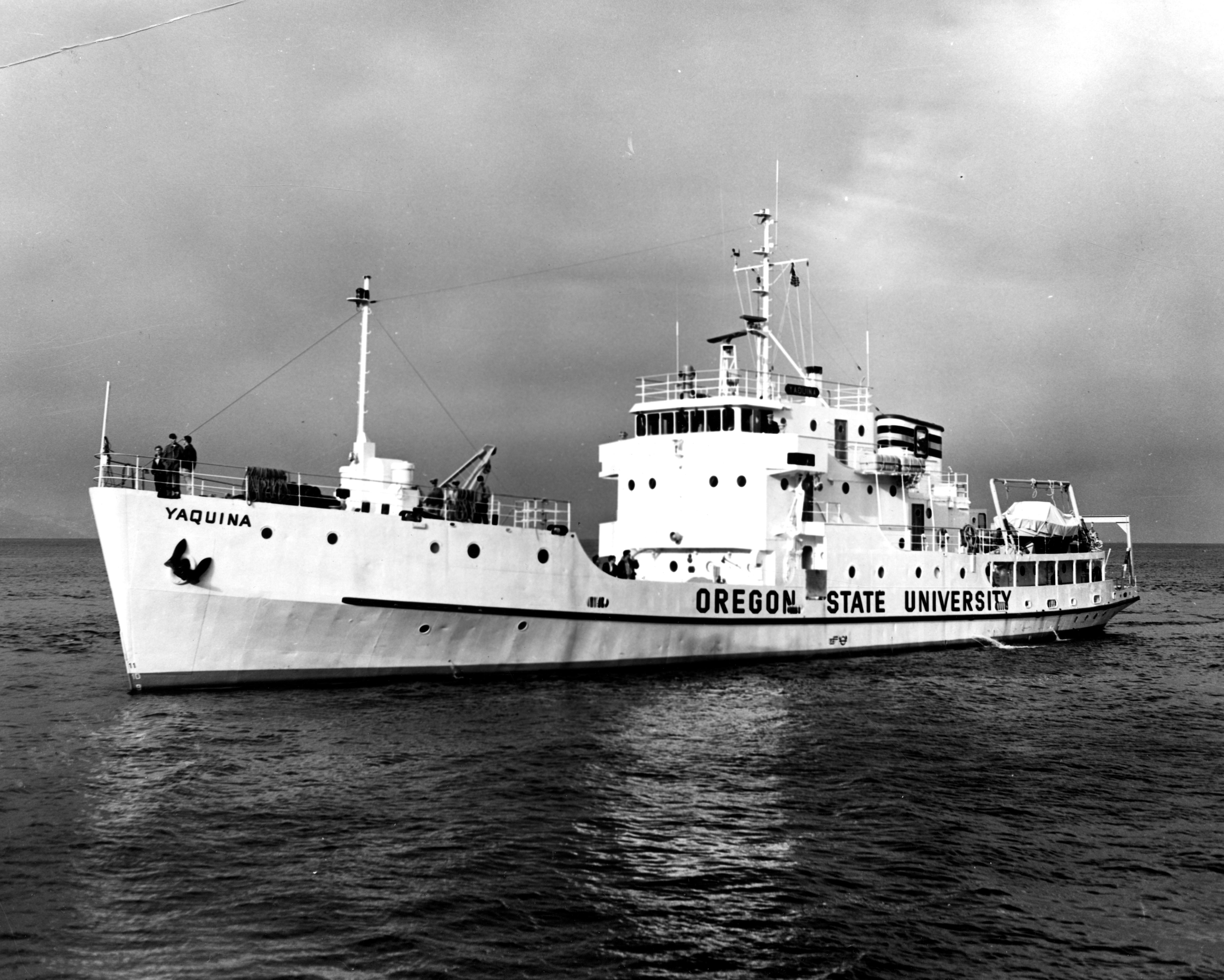
RV Yaquina

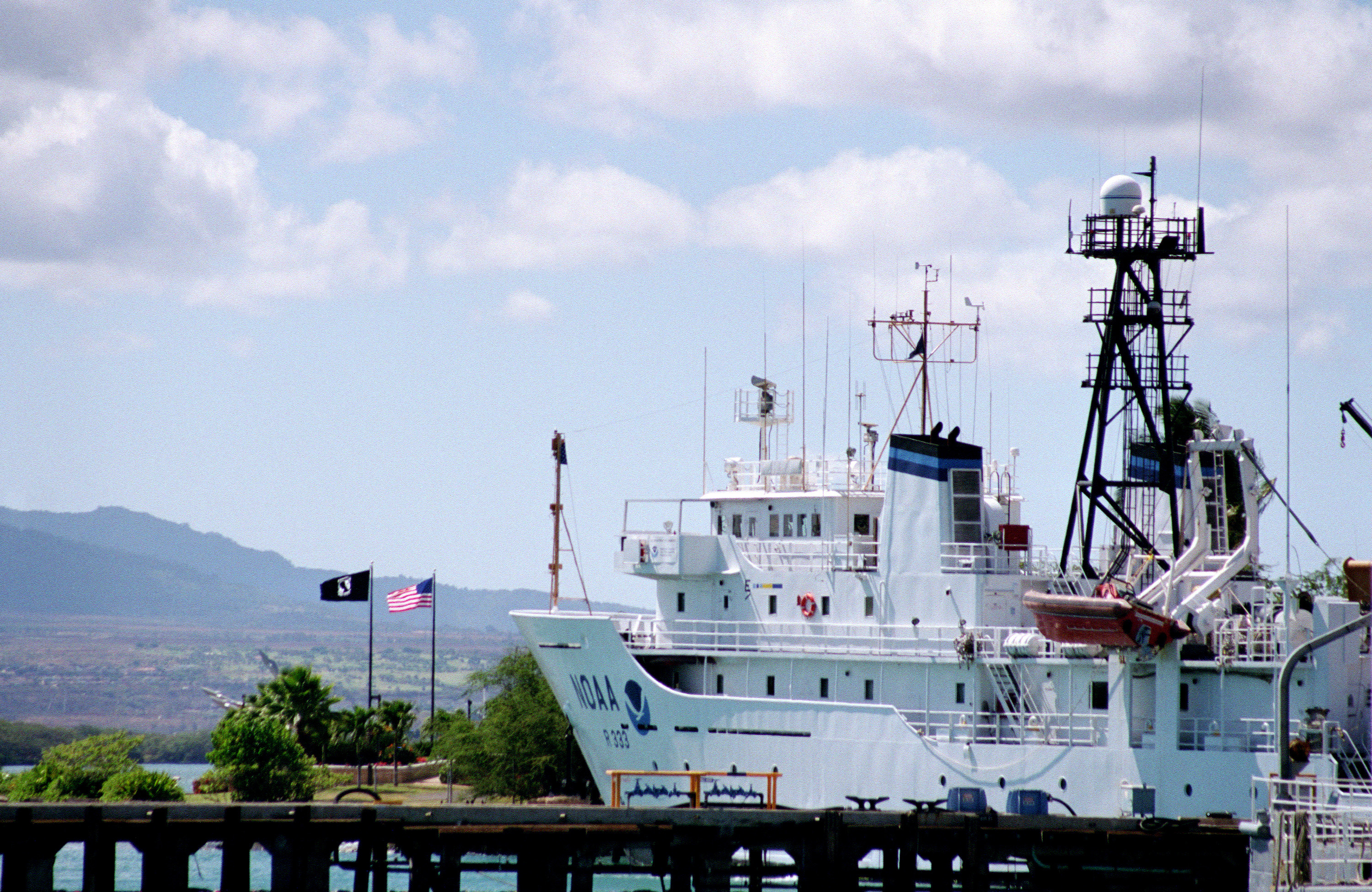
NOAAS Ka'Imimana (R-333).

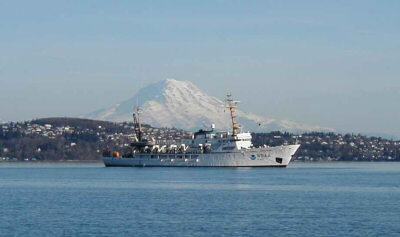
NOAAS Rainier with her namesake, Mount Rainier, in the background.

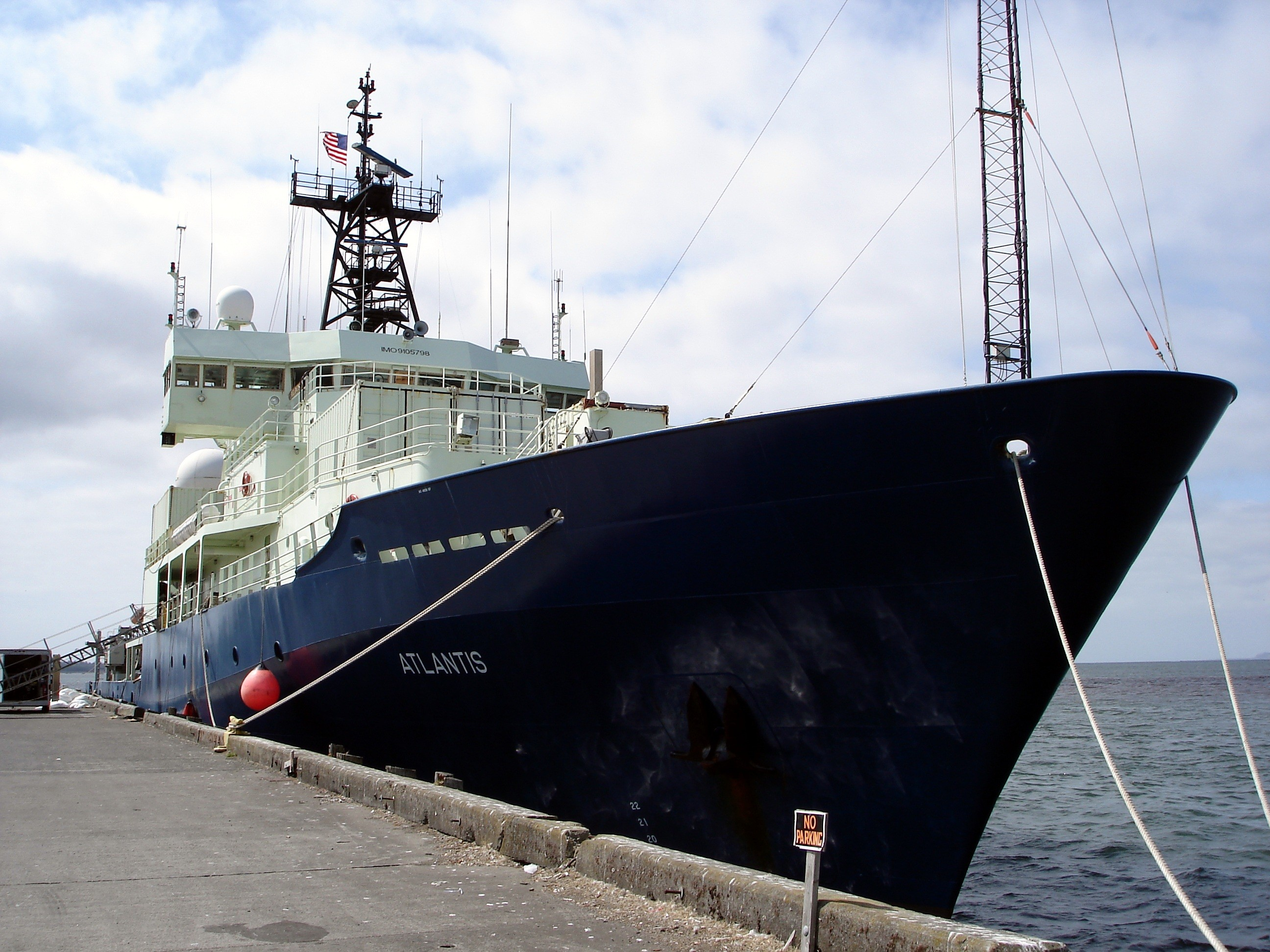
RV Atlantis

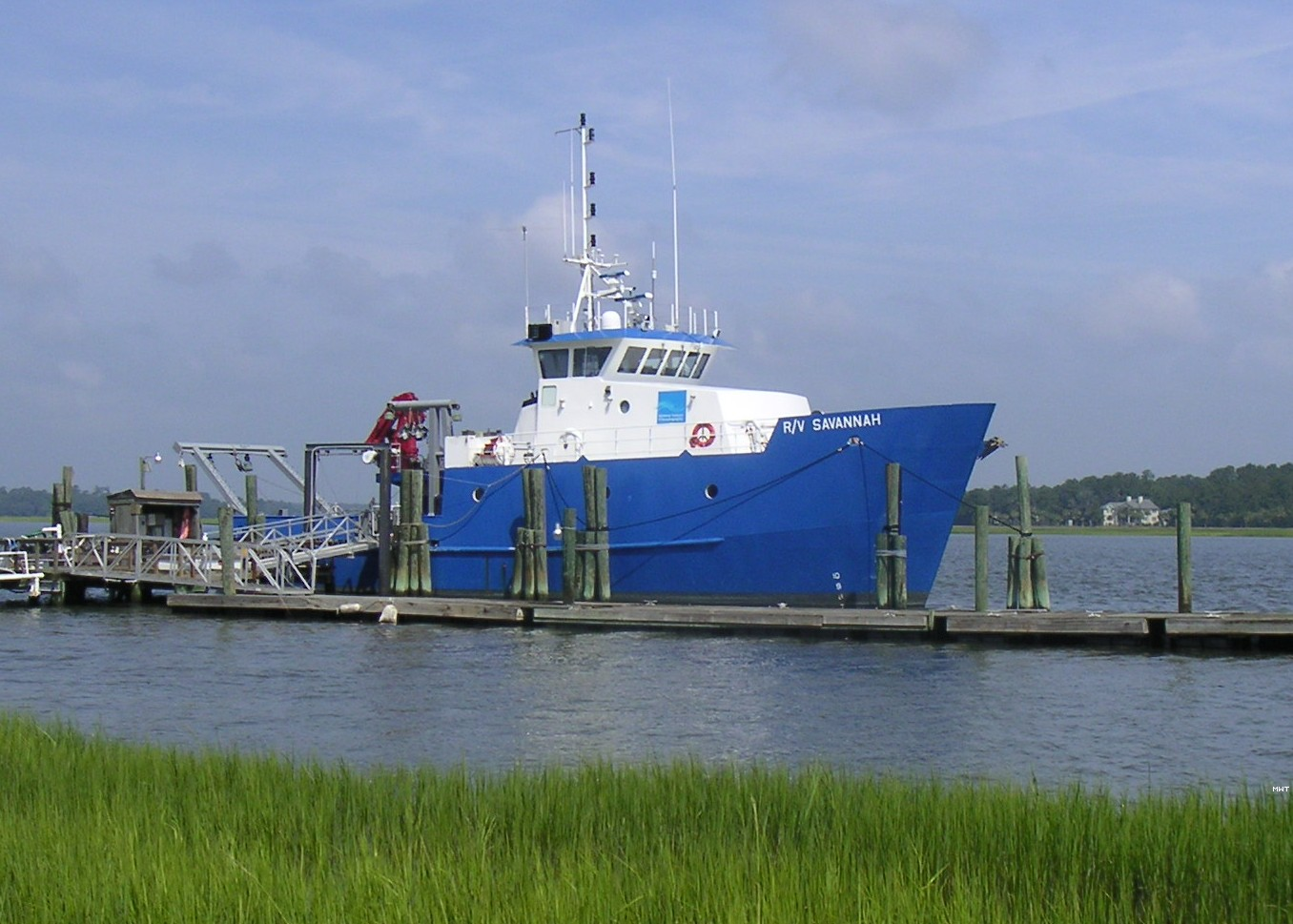
RV Savannah

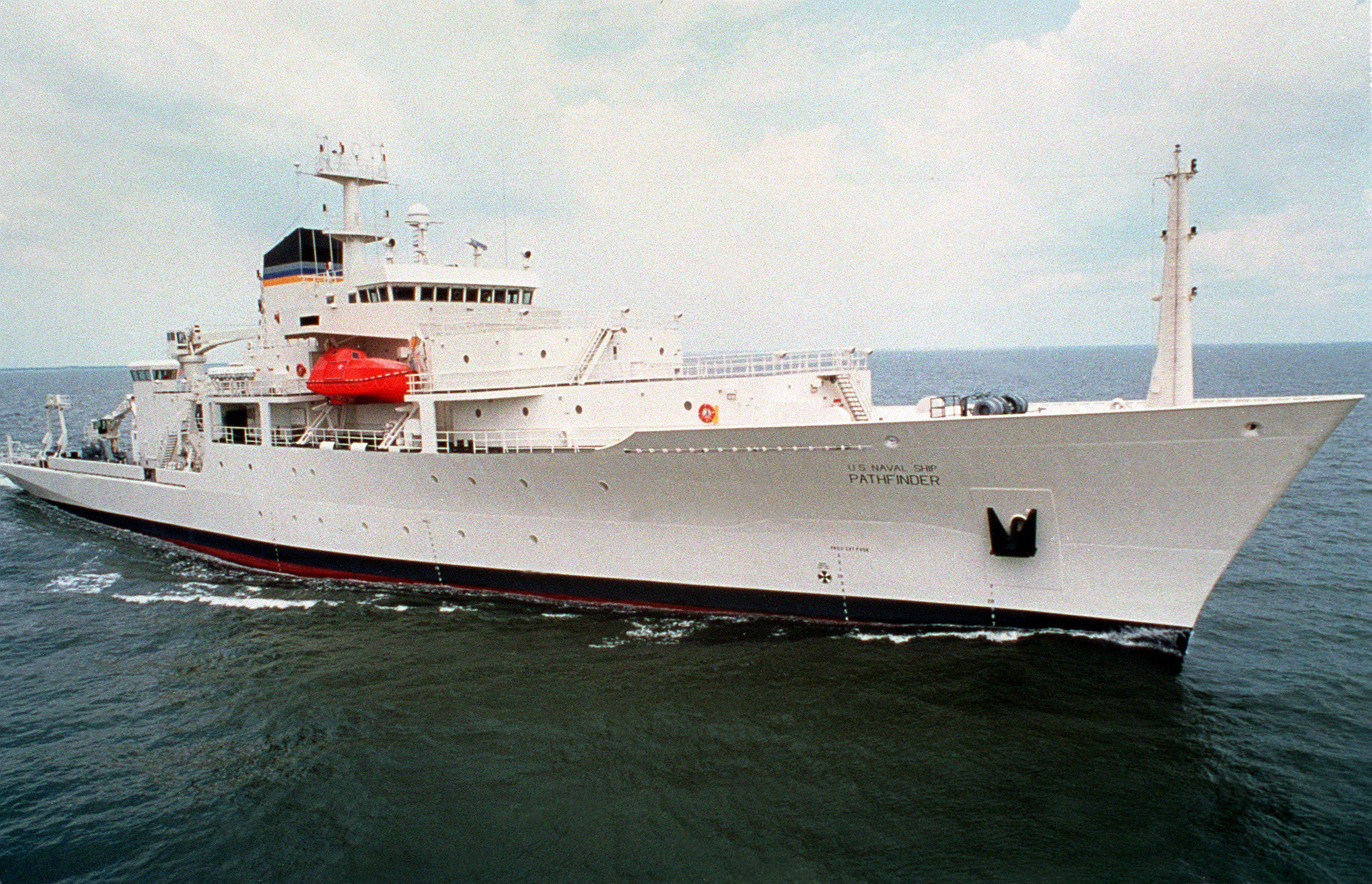
Oceanographic survey ship USNS Pathfinder.

=== Florida Institute of Oceanography ===
- RV Bellows
- RV Suncoaster

=== Oregon State University ===
- RV Taani, under construction
- RV Pacific Storm
- RV Oceanus, formerly Woods Hole Oceanographic Institution
- RV Elakha
- RV Acona (retired)
- RV Cayuse (retired)
- RV Wecoma (retired)
- RV Yaquina (retired)

=== Lamont–Doherty Earth Observatory ===
- RV Vema (1953-1981)
- USNS Robert D. Conrad (1962-1989)
- USNS Eltanin (1962-1974)
- RV Maurice Ewing (1988-2005)
- RV Marcus Langseth (2007)

=== Marine Biological Laboratory ===
- RV Gemma

=== Monterey Bay Aquarium Research Institute ===
- RV Western Flyer
- RV Zephyr
- RV Point Lobos
- RV David Packard
- RV Rachel Carson, formerly Lytal Team and Odyssea Team

=== Moss Landing Marine Laboratories ===
- RV John H. Martin
- RV Point Sur
- RV Sheila B

=== National Oceanic and Atmospheric Administration ===
- NOAAS Bell M. Shimada
- NOAAS David Starr Jordan (Class IV)
- NOAAS Delaware II (Class IV)
- NOAAS Fairweather (Class II)
- NOAAS Ferdinand R. Hassler (Class II)
- NOAAS Gordon Gunter (Class III)
- NOAAS Hi'ialakai (Class III)
- NOAAS Henry B. Bigelow (Class II)
- NOAAS Ka'imimoana (Class III)
- NOAAS Miller Freeman (Class II)
- NOAAS McArthur II (Class III)
- NOAAS Nancy Foster (Class III)
- NOAAS Okeanos Explorer (Class III)
- NOAAS Oregon II (Class III)
- NOAAS Oscar Dyson (Class II)
- NOAAS Oscar Elton Sette (Class III)
- NOAAS Ronald H. Brown (Class I)
- NOAAS Rainier (Class II)
- NOAAS Thomas Jefferson (Class II)

=== Ocean Alliance ===
- RV Odyssey

=== Schmidt Ocean Institute ===
- RV Falkor (donated to Italy, now Gaia Blu)
- RV Falkor (too)

=== Scripps Institution of Oceanography ===
- USS Snatch (ARS-27), better known as RV Argo (1960-1970)
- USNS Thomas Washington (T-AGOR-10) (1965-1992)
- RV Melville, sold to the Philippines and now BRP Gregorio Velasquez
- RP FLIP, sold to a UK company in 2024
- RV Horizon
- RV Spencer F. Baird
- RV New Horizon
- RV Robert Gordon Sproul
- RV Roger Revelle
- RV Sally Ride (AGOR-28)

=== United States Antarctic Program ===
- Nathaniel B. Palmer
- RV Laurence M. Gould

=== United States Coast Guard ===
- USCGC Healy (WAGB-20)
- USCGC Polar Star (WAGB-10)

=== United States Environmental Protection Agency ===
- OSV Bold

=== United States Navy ===
- USNS Hayes
- RV Knorr (transferred to Mexican Navy in 2016)
- RV Melville (retired from service in 2014)
- RV Thomas G. Thompson (operated by the University of Washington)
- RV Atlantis (operated by the Woods Hole Oceanographic Institution)
- RV Roger Revelle (operated by the Scripps Institution of Oceanography)
- RV Kilo Moana (operated by the University of Hawaii)
- RV Neil Armstrong (operated by the Woods Hole Oceanographic Institution)
- RV Sally Ride (operated by the Scripps Institution of Oceanography)
- USS San Carlos

=== Woods Hole Oceanographic Institution ===
- USS Chain (ARS-20) (1958-1977)
- RV Oceanus (now used by the Hatfield Marine Science Center, Oregon State University, College of Earth, Ocean, and Atmospheric Sciences)
- RV Atlantis II (sold in 1996)
- RV Atlantis
- RV Knorr (transferred to Mexican Navy in 2016)
- RV Neil Armstrong (AGOR-27) (2014)
- RV Tioga

=== Others ===
- FWS Black Douglas
- RV Blue Heron (Large Lakes Observatory, University of Minnesota Duluth)
- SSV Corwith Cramer (Sea Education Association)
- RV Cape Hatteras (Marine Technology/Cape Fear Community College)
- RV Coral Reef II (John G. Shedd Aquarium)
- RV Endeavor (URI)
- RV Hugh R. Sharp (University of Delaware Marine and Earth Studies; 2005)
- DV JOIDES Resolution
- SSV Robert C Seamans (Sea Education Association)
- RV Savannah (SkIO)
- RV Te Vega (Hopkins Marine Station)
- RV Thomas G. Thompson (University of Washington)
- RV Vantuna (Occidental College)
- RV FG Walton Smith
- RV White Holly (White Holly Expeditions, LLC)
- RV Zephyr Outbound Marine Pacific Northwest (Private ownership, for hire)
- RV Pelican (LUMCON (Louisiana Universities Marine Consortium))
- RV Rachel Carson, University of Washington, formerly University Marine Biological Station Millport, UK

=== Survey vessels ===
- NOAAS Fairweather
- NOAAS Rainier
- NOAAS Rude
- NOAAS Thomas Jefferson
- USNS Maury and USNS Tanner
- USNS Pathfinder
- USNS Sumner
- USNS Bowditch
- USNS Henson
- USNS Bruce C. Heezen
- USNS Mary Sears
- USNS Josiah Willard Gibbs (T-AGOR-1) (1958-1971)
- Other members of the US Navy fleet with "AGS" notation

== Vietnam ==
- Giáo sư-Viện trưởng Trần Đại Nghĩa (2011)
