= Ernest Holt =

Ernest Holt may refer to:

- Ernest Holt (cricketer) (1904–1970), English cricketer
- Ernest Golsan Holt (1889-1983), American ornithologist and naturalist
- Ernest William Lyons Holt (1864–1922), English marine naturalist and biologist
  - RV Ernest Holt, a fisheries research vessel
