= RV Tellina =

British fisheries research vessel

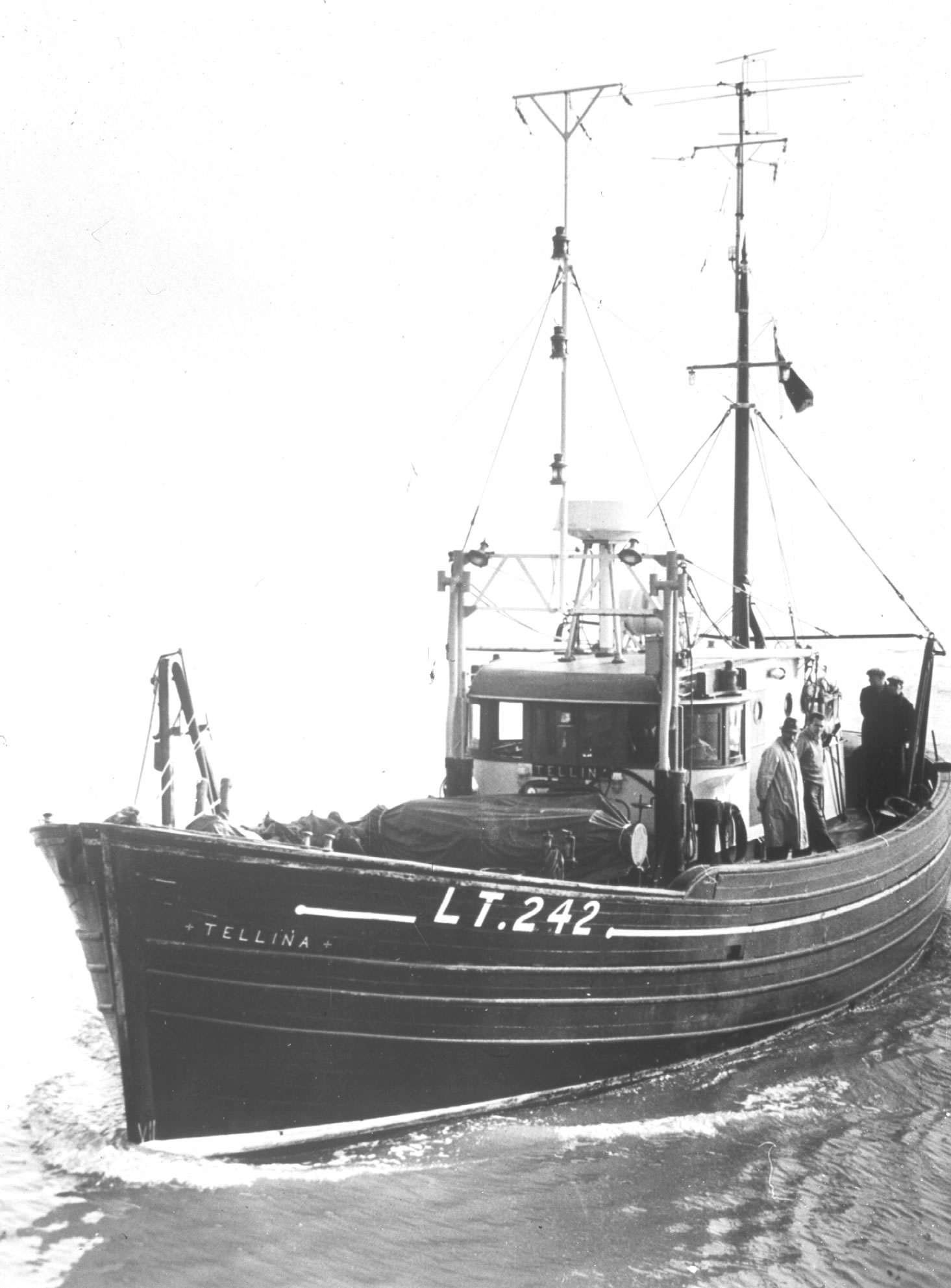
- RV Tellina

History

United Kingdom
- Name: Tellina
- Owner: Ministry of Agriculture, Fisheries and Food (United Kingdom)
- Operator: Ministry of Agriculture, Fisheries and Food (United Kingdom)
- Builder: Jones Buckie Slip & Shipyard Ltd., Buckie, Scotland
- Yard number: 101
- Launched: 1960
- In service: 1960-1981
- Renamed: Dawn Hunter
- Home port: Lowestoft
- Identification: IMO number: 301534
- Fate: currently for sale in Poole Harbour

General characteristics
- Type: Research vessel; Yacht
- Displacement: 55 tonnes
- Length: 18.3 m (60 ft 0 in)
- Beam: 5.6 m (18 ft 4 in)
- Draught: 2.2 m (7 ft 3 in)
- Propulsion: Gardner 6L3 114 HP Diesel

RV Tellina (LT242) was a fisheries research vessel operated between 1960 and 1981 by the Ministry of Agriculture, Fisheries and Food - Directorate of Fisheries, now known as the Centre for Environment, Fisheries and Aquaculture Science (Cefas).

== Construction and career ==
Tellina was constructed by Jones Buckie Slip & Shipyard Ltd., Buckie, Scotland (yard number 101), to replace the earlier research vessel RV Onaway. Tellina was launched in 1960, and built according to a design prepared by the United Kingdom White Fish Authority. The specification called for the vessel to have a shallow draught so that she could work close inshore, and for her to be capable of using harbours that largely dried out at low water.

In 1982, Tellina was sold into private ownership, and renamed Dawn Hunter. Between 1984 and 1988, Dawn Hunter was re-hired several times by the Ministry of Agriculture, Fisheries and Food to continue her earlier inshore surveying, expanding the scope to include Nephrops fishing grounds on the coast of northeast England. During this time, she was listed as being owned by Captain John Cole, and based out of Whitby, Yorkshire.

She was briefly owned by the proprietor of Belfast Marine and was subsequently rebuilt into a luxury yacht, according to a design by G.L. Watson & Co. of Liverpool. Dawn Hunter was fitted out as a ketch, a two-masted sailing craft. She is primarily constructed of pitch pine planking on oak frames with mahogany superstructure. Dawn Hunter was listed as being for sale for a price of GB £235,000 in Poole Harbour, Dorset in 2018, and was subsequently sold to an unknown buyer.

== Service as a fisheries research vessel ==
Tellina (LT242) was in service with Ministry of Agriculture, Fisheries and Food from August 1960 until October 1981, during which time she participated in 281 separate research campaigns. Tellina was largely confined to inshore coastal waters, mostly engaging in inshore surveys of young flatfish around the British Isles; herring and sprat in the Wash, Humber, and Thames estuaries; and inshore shellfish stocks (such as crab, lobster, scallops, and whelks). Tellina operated out of the port of Lowestoft and also surveyed off the coasts of East Anglia and North Wales, in Cardigan Bay, and on the English Channel.

In mid-April 1963, Tellina made an exploratory trawl survey around the Channel Islands. During this trawl, M.R. Vince took the opportunity to question local fishermen about marine animal die-off during the severe winter of 1962–63 now known as the "Big Freeze."

In June 1970, Tellina was used to conduct a series of fishing gear trials. A team of scuba divers was employed to observe and photograph the seabed both in front of and immediately behind a moving trawl. During each trial, two divers "rode" on the headline of the net, taking photographs or filming the action of the gear, and making occasional excursions forward along the net wings or back to the cod-end. This extremely hazardous procedure would likely not be allowed today and has been made unnecessary by the use of automatic cameras attached to fishing gears.

Studies aboard Tellina in the early 1960s showed that the young stages of commercially important flatfish, particularly sole and plaice, could be found in inshore nursery grounds, but there was no information on the size or extent of these juvenile populations. Further surveys of the inshore waters of England between 1970 and 1972 revealed the general extent of the nursery grounds for the first time, and identified areas that were particularly important for the survival and growth of young fish. These early surveys subsequently evolved into an annual Young Fish Survey (YFS) that continued uninterrupted from 1981 until 2010. It included multiple sites along the North Sea coast, the Thames estuary, and the English Channel, especially around the Solent.

Tellina was used extensively to investigate the distribution and abundance of 0-group (juvenile) herring, using beach seine and midwater trawls. This survey made use of early echo-sounding techniques. The larval surveys, which had been started in 1956 aboard the vessels Onaway and Platessa, were continued on an international basis, and an annual pre-recruit survey was inaugurated by the International Council for the Exploration of the Sea (ICES) in 1963. Tellina was also used for investigations into other pelagic species of commercial importance.

== See also ==
- Centre for Environment, Fisheries and Aquaculture Science
