= RV Platessa =

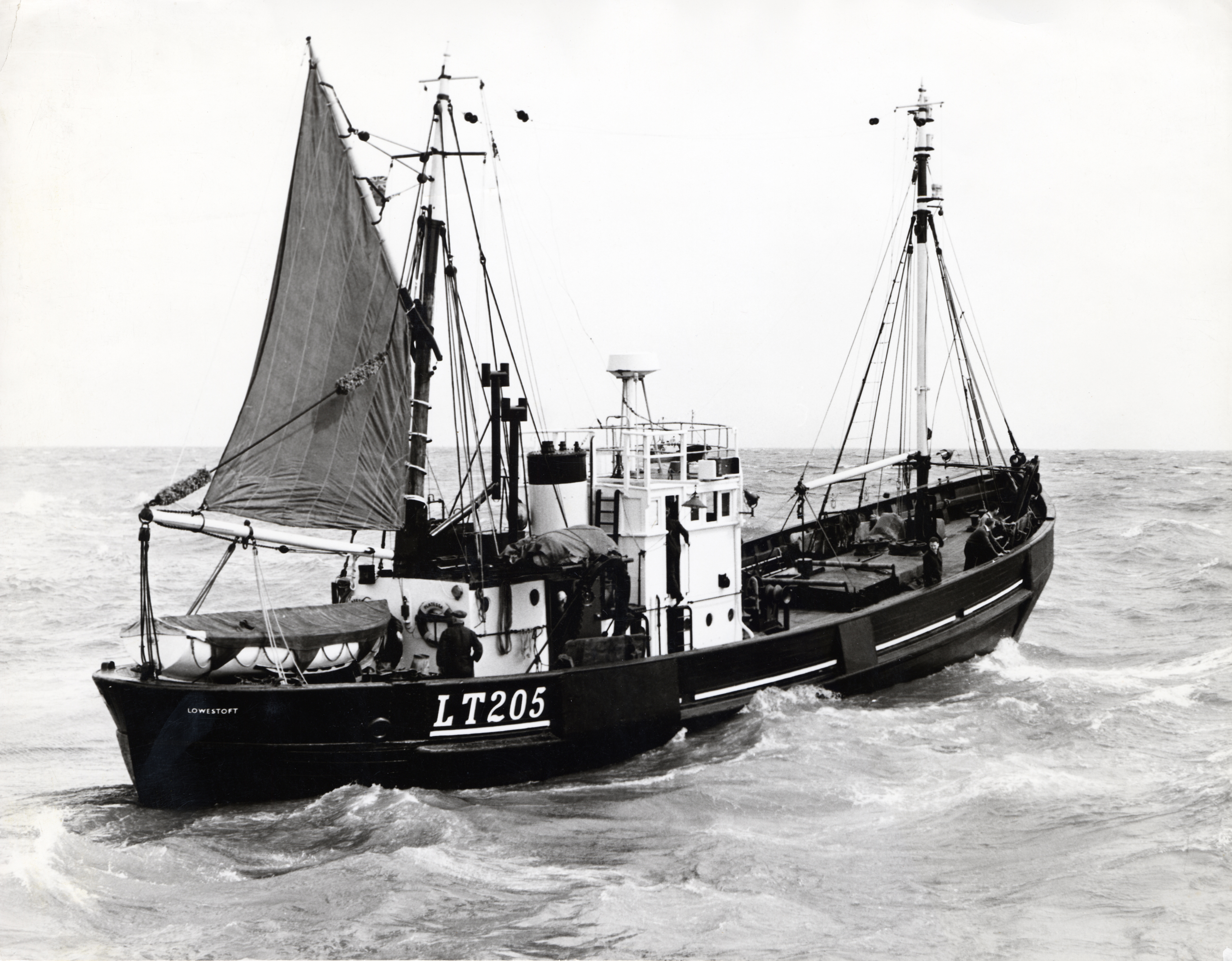
- RV Platessa

History

United Kingdom
- Name: RV Platessa (LT205)
- Owner: The Admiralty; Ministry of Defence (United Kingdom); H.J. Lamprell Ltd.
- Operator: Ministry of Agriculture, Fisheries and Food (United Kingdom)
- Ordered: 26 February 1944
- Builder: East Anglian Constructors, Oulton Broad
- Commissioned: April 1946
- In service: 1946-1967
- Home port: Lowestoft
- Identification: MFV 1576
- Fate: Hulked at Lake Lothing

General characteristics
- Class & type: '1501-Class' MFV
- Type: Admiralty Motor Fishing Vessel (MFV); Fisheries Research Vessel
- Length: 27 m (88 ft 7 in)
- Beam: 7.4 m (24 ft 3 in)
- Propulsion: 4 Cyl. diesel engine by Crossley Bros., Manchester. 240 B.H.P
- Speed: 9 knots (10 mph; 17 km/h)
- Complement: 11 crew
- Armament: 1 20mm AA machine gun

RV Platessa (LT205) was a fisheries research vessel that was operated by the Ministry of Agriculture, Fisheries and Food (United Kingdom) - Directorate of Fisheries, now known as the Centre for Environment, Fisheries and Aquaculture Science (Cefas) between 1946 and 1967.

RV Platessa was based at the port of Lowestoft and was originally ordered by the Admiralty as one of 81 Motor Fishing Vessels (MFVs) in the ‘1501-Class’ during World War II. Motor fishing vessels were small wooden craft, built-in large numbers during the war for use as Ship's tenders.

Constructed as MFV 1576 by East Anglian Constructors at Oulton Broad, she was ordered on 26 February 1944, but not completed by the end of the wartime. Trials began in April 1946, and she was taken into service (but not ownership) as an unfinished hull by the Ministry of Agriculture and Fisheries (United Kingdom) and converted to a fishing research vessel. She was adapted to carry a trawl on her starboard side. The Platessa's work was almost equally divided between co-operation with the RV Sir Lancelot in the East Anglian herring fishery survey, plaice population surveys, plaice marking, mesh experiments and comparative fishing tests.

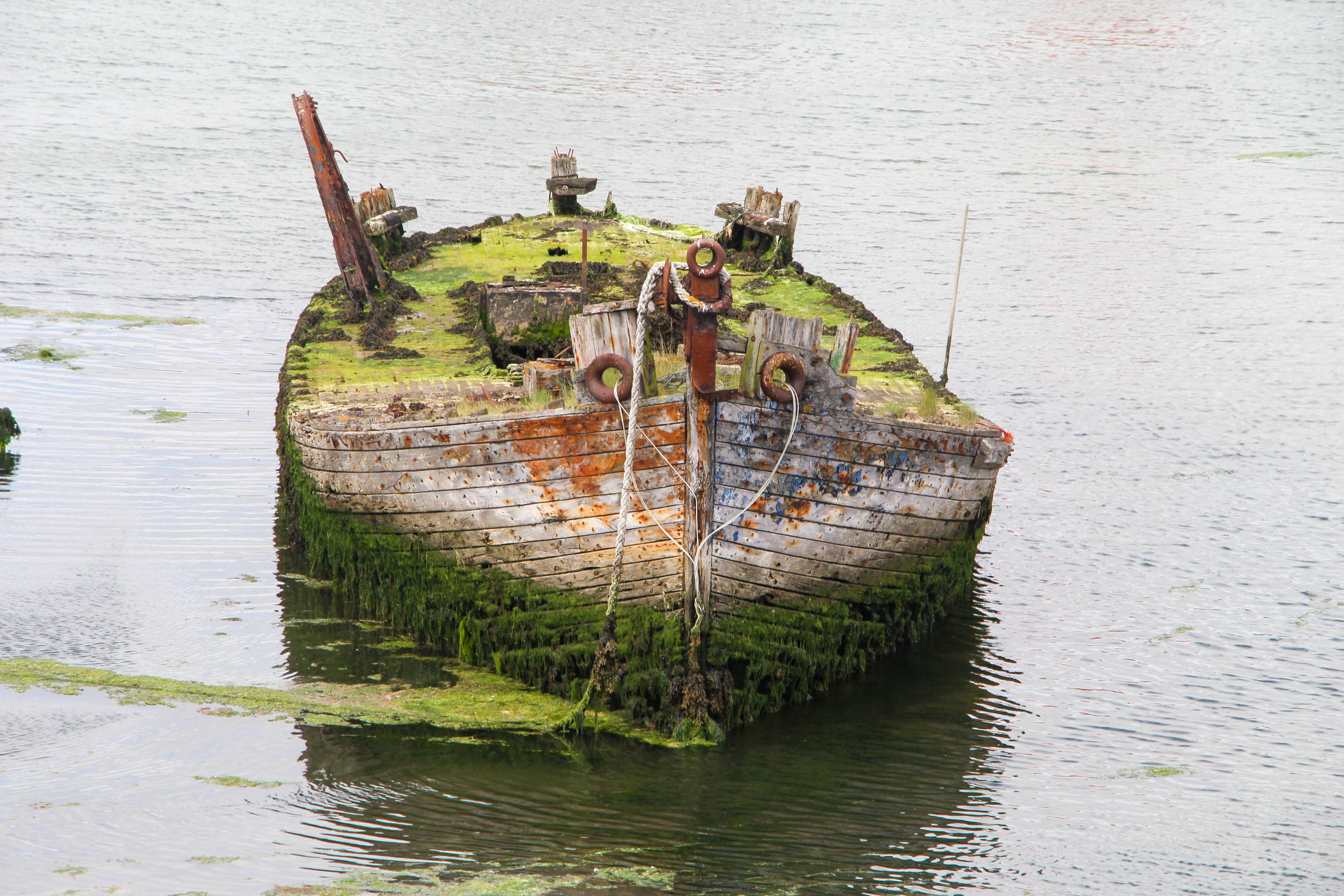
The rotting hulk of Platessa in Lake Lothing in June 2023

In 1967 the RV Platessa was handed back to the Ministry of Defence (United Kingdom) after 20 years in service, she was replaced by the RV Corella. In 1968 the RV Platessa was sold to private owners (H.J. Lamprell Ltd) and after sinking in Hamilton Dock, Lowestoft in 1975 she was eventually hulked at Lake Lothing where her remains lay for many years. She was recorded as still extant in Lake Lothing on 19 August 2015, and she continues to exist as one of two wooden wrecks (the other being the MFV Yellowtail) in the central basin.

== Service as a fisheries research vessel ==
The RV Platessa (LT205) was in service with the Ministry of Agriculture, Fisheries and Food (United Kingdom) from April 1946 until June 1967, during which time she participated in more than 473 separate research campaigns. She was primarily confined to the southern North Sea, but with occasional forays into the Irish Sea and English Channel, especially in the 1960s.

The RV Platessa (LT205) was overwhelmingly dedicated to research on North Sea herring and North Sea Plaice. This work included the tagging of more than 12,000 plaice during the 1950s, 7000 during the 1960s. In addition, large numbers of tagged plaice were released off the Cumberland coast, using the RV Platessa during 1949 and 1950.

In August 1951 echo-sounder traces were obtained over a wide area off Whitby by the RV 'Platessa', using a Marconi sounder. They were found to occur at a depth corresponding to that of a sharp thermocline, and small whiting about 3 in. in length, large Medusae, herring and sandeel larvae were caught with a pelagic trawl at the depth of the trace. This work was reported in a ‘letter’ to the journal Nature in 1952.

In 1950 the RV Platessa was involved in comparative herring surveys alongside the RV Clupea. The RV Clupea (a 75 ft motor drifter) had been taken into service in August 1948 and shared with the Scottish Home Department's Aberdeen Laboratory, working half of the year from Aberdeen and the other half from Lowestoft. This arrangement lasted until 1952 when the RV Clupea was allocated full-time for the use of the Aberdeen scientists.

During many of the earliest research cruises aboard RV Platessa (in the 1940s) scientists used a Secchi disk to assess light penetration (turbidity) in the southern North Sea. Recently, Cefas scientists re-discovered 469 historical Secchi depth measurements in survey logbooks, collected in 1931, 1937, 1946–50, and 1968. These historical measurements have revealed that the ‘sechhi depth’ was much deeper (and therefore water more transparent) in the past compared to today, and thus that the North Sea has become much more turbid.

The Suffolk Record Office holds a photograph captioned "survey ship Platessa LT 205 in Lowestoft harbour after being escorted back by the Gorleston lifeboat Khami having sprung a leak whilst working in the Smiths Knoll area", dated 5 October 1968 (after leaving MAFF service).

== See also ==
- Centre for Environment, Fisheries and Aquaculture Science
