= RV Cirolana =

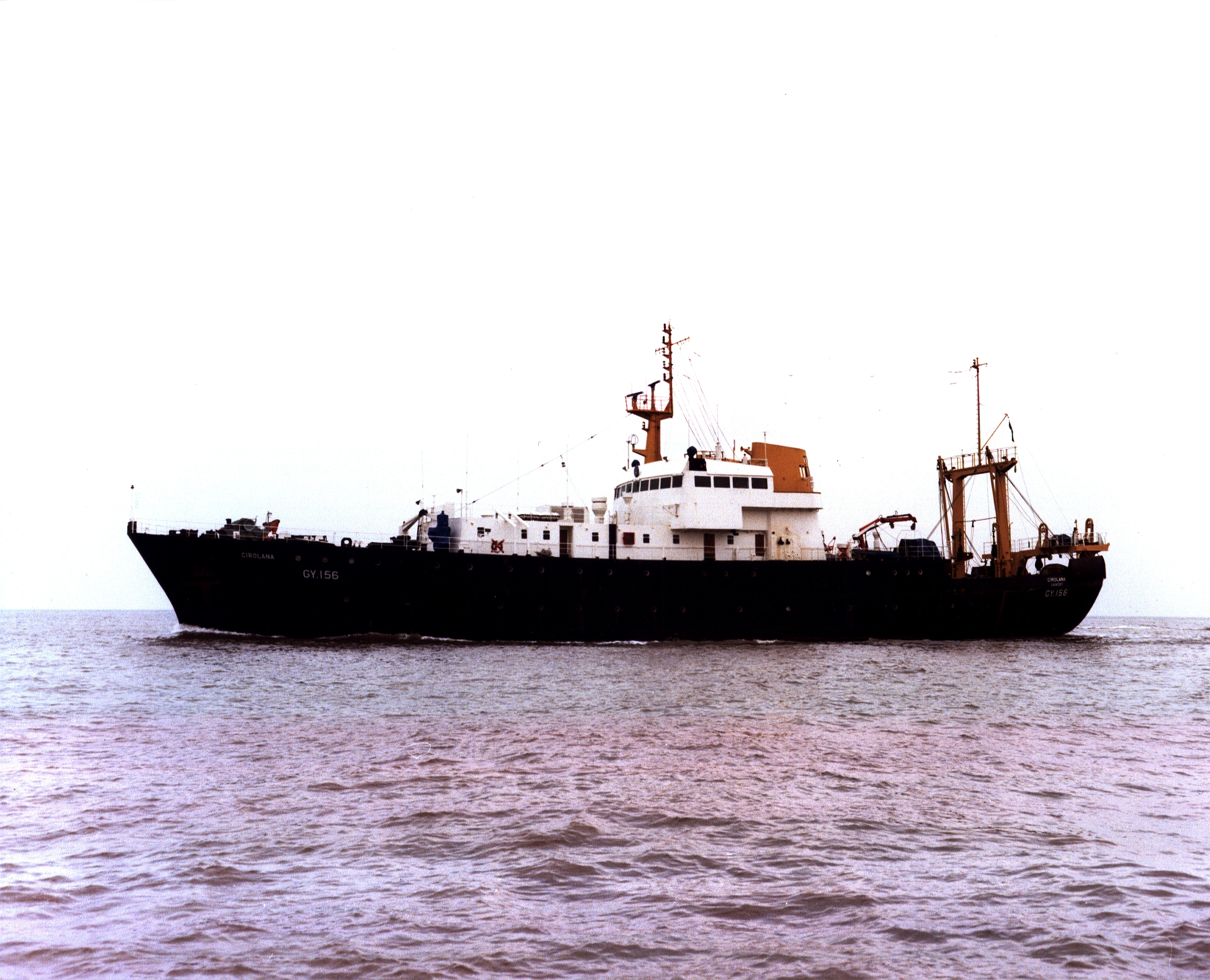
- RV Cirolana during the early 1990s

History

United Kingdom
- Name: RV Cirolana
- Owner: Ministry of Agriculture, Fisheries and Food (United Kingdom)
- Ordered: late 1967
- Builder: Ferguson Shipbuilders, Port Glasgow
- Yard number: 454
- Launched: 17/09/1969
- Commissioned: July 1970
- Decommissioned: c. 2003
- Homeport: Grimsby; Lowestoft
- Identification: IMO number: 6928711
- Fate: Broken Up 11 December 2003 at Klaipeda

General characteristics
- Displacement: 1,919 t (1,889 long tons)
- Length: 72.54 m (238 ft 0 in)
- Beam: 14.02 m (46 ft 0 in)
- Draught: 5.04 m (16 ft 6 in)
- Speed: 16 knots (18 mph; 30 km/h)
- Endurance: 10,000 mi (16,000 km) at 14 knots (16 mph; 26 km/h)
- Complement: Up to 48 crew and scientists

RV Cirolana was a fisheries research vessel used by the Centre for Environment, Fisheries and Aquaculture Science and originally built for the Ministry of Agriculture, Fisheries and Food (United Kingdom). She was initially intended to replace the RV Ernest Holt operating in arctic waters around Bear Island (Norway) and Iceland, but following the Cod Wars spent most of her working life conducting fisheries surveys in the North Sea, Irish Sea and English Channel. For the first part of her career RV Cirolana was based in the fishing port of Grimsby, but after bridge and channel dredging work improved the depth, it was deemed acceptable to bring her to Lowestoft.

Her engines etc were housed in a sound and vibration proof enclosure which was supported on many pneumatic dampers. She had main electric propulsion motors which powered the screws. All ancillaries were also damped using anti-vibration mountings. All this damping was aimed at reducing noise/vibrations through the superstructure to enable the ability to conduct acoustic surveys of fish populations .

She was built in 1969, by Ferguson Shipbuilders, and delivered in 1970. She was placed out of service in approximately 2003 and replaced by RV Cefas Endeavour.

On Friday 24 June 1977 RV Cirolana participated in the Silver Jubilee Fleet Review at Spithead in the Solent

== Service as a fisheries research vessel ==
RV Cirolana was the principle fisheries research vessel employed by the Ministry of Agriculture, Fisheries and Food (United Kingdom) throughout the period 1970 to 2003. She was used extensively for fish stock surveys and oceanographic investigations.

In the early 1970s RV Cirolana conducted extensive surveys around Greenland, Iceland and the Faroe Islands as well as several trips to the Labrador Sea. In 1973-4, she carried out deep-water surveys down to depths as great as 1200m along the Atlantic continental slope to the west of the British Isles and at banks further out in the Atlantic - Rockall, Hatton, Rosemary Bank and Bill Bailey's.

There were ongoing issues with Cirolana's impellers being fouled by floating netting, which would then require that the ship navigate back to a safe harbour on bow thrusters alone, followed by the hire of professional divers to remove the obstruction.

In 1999, and again in 2000, she rediscovered a post-medieval wreck at 51.474930N, 5.200480W. The wreck was first reported in July 1945, and is 84m long.

== See also ==
- Centre for Environment, Fisheries and Aquaculture Science
- Cod wars
