= SY Hildegarde and SY Hiawatha =

Steam yachts

The SY Hildegarde and the SY Hiawatha were steam yachts chartered by the Ministry of Agriculture, Fisheries and Food (United Kingdom) - Directorate of Fisheries, now known as the Centre for Environment, Fisheries and Aquaculture Science (Cefas) between 1912 and 1914 to carry out fishery investigations.

== SY Hildegarde ==
History

United Kingdom
- Name: SY Hildegarde
- Owner: Sir John Denison-Pender, London (26/01/1904 ); Albert H. Illingworth, Bradford (1905); Noel Pemberton Billing, London (1911); Egyptian Government (Egyptian Survey Department), Alexandria (1913)
- Operator: Ministry of Agriculture, Fisheries and Food (United Kingdom)
- Builder: Bow, McLachlan & Co. Ltd., Thistle Yard, Paisley
- Yard number: 171
- Launched: 08/12/1903
- Renamed: Maretanza 1904; Hildegarde 1905; Managem 1913

General characteristics
- Type: Steam yacht; Survey vessel
- Tonnage: 206grt, 87nrt
- Length: 118.9 ft (36.2 m)
- Beam: 19.7 ft (6.0 m)
- Draught: 10.8 ft (3.3 m)
- Propulsion: C2cy 570ihp 53/85nhp 12kn, 1-screw steam engine constructed by Bow, McLachlan & Co. Ltd.

Bow, McLachlan and Company was a Scottish marine engineering and shipbuilding company that traded between 1872 and 1932. Ships built at the Thistle Yard in 1904 included the 206grt/205TM steam yacht Maretanza (launched on 08/12/1903, Yard Number 171), commissioned by John Denison-Pender, 1st Baron Pender. Renamed Hildegarde around 1905, ownership changed to Albert H. Illingworth of Bradford. Ownership changed again in 1911 to Noel Pemberton Billing, from whom she was hired by the Ministry of Agriculture, Fisheries and Food (United Kingdom), London and then to the Egyptian Government in 1913, to be used as a survey yacht by the Egyptian Survey Department, Alexandria.

== SY Hiawatha ==
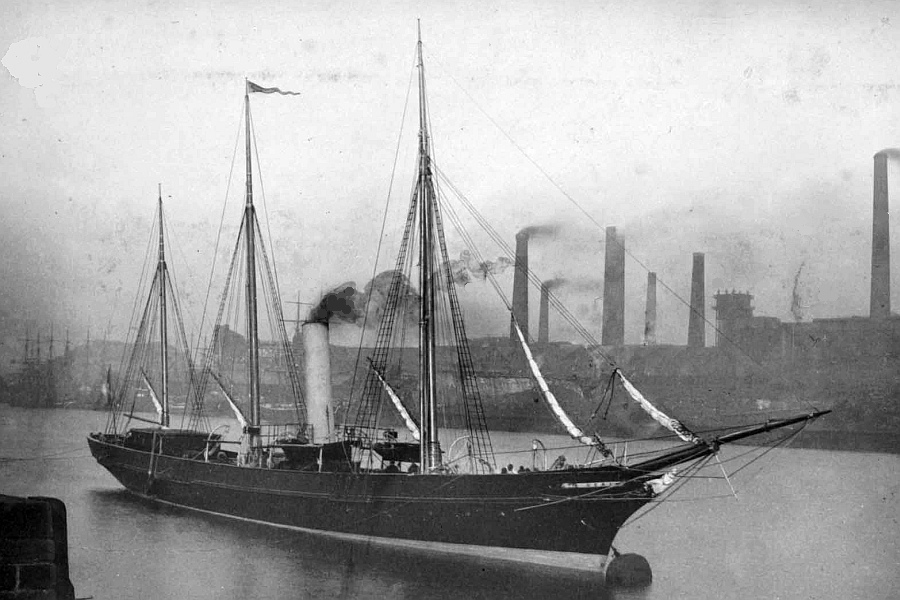
- Steam yacht Nora (Hiawatha) in 1880

History

United Kingdom
- Name: SY Hiawatha
- Owner: Jean Baptiste Perrett, Marseille (1880); Donald Horne Macfarlane (1888); Archibald William Montgomerie, Earl of Eglington & Winton (1892); William Baird, Elie (1909); William Rice, Southampton (1910); H Hiller & W Lang, Hamburg (1910); Noel Pemberton Billing, London (1913); REV James Ltd., Southampton (1915); Ocean Salvage Co Ltd., London (1917); TurkGemi Kurtarma Anon Sirketi, Istanbul (1930); Sultan Kurt ve Ort, Istanbul (1966)
- Operator: Ministry of Agriculture, Fisheries and Food (United Kingdom)
- Builder: Charles Mitchell & Co, Low Walker, Newcastle Upon Tyne
- Yard number: 392
- Launched: 21/12/1879
- Commissioned: 1880
- Renamed: Nora 1880; Hiawatha 1888; Clara 1910; Hiawatha 1913; Polygon 1915; La Valette 1916; Lavet 1932; Akbas 1935; Yenigundogdu 1966
- Home port: London
- Identification: 94507 (1888); IMO number: 7830569
- Fate: Broken up in Turkey 1982

General characteristics
- Type: Steam yacht; Salvage vessel; Cargo vessel
- Tonnage: 339grt, 219nrt
- Length: 176.8 ft (53.9 m)
- Beam: 26.1 ft (8.0 m)
- Draught: 13.4 ft (4.1 m)
- Propulsion: CI2 cyl (25 & 45 x 27ins), 75nhp steam engine constructed by R & W Hawthorn, Newcastle

SY Hiawatha was built as the steam yacht Nora by Charles Mitchell & Co, Low Walker, Newcastle Upon Tyne. She was launched on 21 December 1879 (Yard Number 392), but was renamed as the SY Hiawatha in 1888 when she was taken into the ownership of Donald Horne Macfarlane and re-registered in Southampton. Her dimensions were 339grt, 219nrt, 176.8 x 26.1 x 13.4 ft and she was powered by a single screw propeller and a steam engine constructed by R & W Hawthorn, Newcastle. Over her long lifetime she had many changes of ownership and name changes (and was variously known as the Clara, Polygon, La Valette, Akbas and Yeni Gundogdu), but between 1913 and 1915 she had reverted to the name Hiawatha and was owned by Noel Pemberton Billing and registered in London. In 1916 she was converted to a salvage vessel and between November 1917 to 1919 she was employed on Admiralty service as the La Valette. She was eventually (in 1966) converted into a cargo vessel and ended her life as B. Kartal in Turkey, where she was finally broken up in 1982.

== History ==
=== Fishery investigations ===
In January 1910, on instruction from the Chancellor of the Exchequer, HM Treasury passed responsibility for North Sea fishery investigations to the Board of Agriculture and Fisheries (later MAFF), who in-turn were required to come to an agreement with the Marine Biological Association (MBA) as to how scientific investigations could continue into the future, in support of the International Council for the Exploration of the Sea (ICES). On 1 April 1910 staff at the fisheries laboratory in Lowestoft moved to 43 Parliament Street, London, becoming civil servants. The Association closed the Lowestoft fisheries laboratory and sold the RV Huxley. Consequently, from then onwards the now London-based staff were forced to make their research voyages aboard chartered commercial vessels.

During the course of the financial year 1912-13 a grant was made available to allow the Board of Agriculture and Fisheries to charter the steam yacht Hildegarde for a series of dedicated studies into the adverse consequences of trawling on herring populations. This was in response to fears raised by parts of the industry at a public meeting held at Great Yarmouth in October 1912. These herring investigations used a variety of different nets including Shrimp trawl, Otter trawl, and herring drift nets. The vessel operated throughout the southern North Sea, but in particular on herring fishing grounds around the Wash and the north Norfolk coast, most notably Saltfleet, Lynn Deep, Lynn Well, Boston Deep, Mablethorpe, Dudsen, and Cromer. A second grant was made available for vessel charter in the following financial year (1913-1914), to allow these studies on the SY Hildegarde to continue.

By 1914 the Board of Agriculture and Fisheries also started to make use of the steam yacht Hiawatha (Captain W.H. Stewart). Surveys were made throughout the southern North Sea (as far North as the Northumberland coast, along the Dutch coast and around East Anglia) focused on plankton sampling and demersal fish resources – using a variety of bottom trawl nets. Nearly all of this work came to an abrupt end in August 1914 with the outbreak of the First World War.

Scientist's logbooks from these historical surveys are now held by the Centre for Environment, Fisheries and Aquaculture Science (Cefas) in Lowestoft and datasets have recently been digitized as part of the Trawling through Time initiative.

Additional survey work was carried out by the Board of Agriculture and Fisheries on sprat and small herring (whitebait) in 1915 and 1916 aboard the chartered fishing vessel SS Unity (LO 170) although restricted to the East Anglian coast and Thames estuary.

=== Espionage during the First World War ===
Before the First World War, the SY Hildegarde was renamed as the Managem. On 15 January 1917 she was requisitioned by the Admiralty and armed with a 12 pdr naval gun. She served in the ‘special yacht squadron’ as a wireless-equipped armed patrol Group Leader and operated throughout the Mediterranean and Gulf of Suez. Notably she was stationed off Atlit in Israel and used to relay espionage messages from operatives onshore (and briefly used by the Jewish "Nili" espionage group). In April 1917, a new captain, Lieutenant Kane, was appointed to the Managem, while Captain Lewen Weldon represented British intelligence on board. One of Weldon's tasks was to deposit agents and spies on the shores of Palestine and Syria and to transmit telegraphic messages from the ship to British central intelligence in Cairo. Eventually it was decided to withdraw her and to use homing pigeons to convey this information, due to the presence of German submarines in the area. HMS Managem was included on two Admiralty ‘Pink Lists’ (compiled every three to four days to show the stations and movements of ships) from 30 June 1918 and 11 November 1918. The vessel is recorded as being one of several ‘Auxiliary Patrol Yachts’ located in Egypt and the Red Sea.

== See also ==
- Centre for Environment, Fisheries and Aquaculture Science
