= E. S. Russell =

Scottish biologist and philosopher of biology (1887–1954)

Edward Stuart Russell
- Born: 25 March 1887; Glasgow
- Died: 24 August 1954 (aged 67); Hastings
- Education: University of Glasgow
- Known for: Some theoretical considerations on the "overfishing" problem
- Scientific career
- Fields: Fisheries science, evolutionary biology
- Workplaces: Fisheries Laboratory, Lowestoft

Edward Stuart Russell OBE FLS (25 March 1887 – 24 August 1954) was a Scottish biologist and philosopher of biology.

Russell was born near Glasgow. He studied at Greenock Academy and later at Glasgow University under Sir Graham Kerr and worked with J. Arthur Thompson after he graduated. He was influenced by his friend Patrick Geddes and in his zoological studies, sought to find holistic principles. He also believed in Lamarckian heritability. He was involved in fishery research, working on research vessels and publishing on the biology of cephalopods and quantitative methods for gathering fishery data. He also worked as Scottish Fisheries expert, Inspector of Fisheries and as an advisor to HM Government. He was the first editor of the Journal du Conceil (now ICES Journal of Marine Science). He was an honorary lecturer on animal behaviour at the University College, London for about fifteen years. He was elected President of the Zoology section of the British Association in 1934. From 1940—42, he served as the President of the Linnean Society. He died at Hastings, East Sussex, from heart failure at the age of 67.

Russell favored holism and organicism. He was a critic of the modern synthesis and presented his own evolutionary theory uniting developmental biology with heredity but opposing Mendelian inheritance. He was influenced by Karl Ernst von Baer and Johann Wolfgang von Goethe. He saw teleology as inherent in the organism.

== Books ==
- Form and Function: A Contribution to the History of Animal Morphology (1916)
- The Study of Living Things: Prolegomena to a Functional Biology (1924)
- The Interpretation of Development and Heredity: A Study in Biological Method (1930)
- The Behavior of Animals (1934)
- The Directiveness of Organic Activities (1945)
- The Diversity of Animals: An Evolutionary Study (1962)
