= SS Henry B. Plant =

Liberty ship of WWII

History

United States
- Name: Henry B. Plant
- Namesake: Henry B. Plant
- Owner: War Shipping Administration (WSA)
- Operator: A.L. Burbank & Co., Ltd.
- Ordered: as type (EC2-S-C1) hull, MC hull 2510
- Awarded: 23 April 1943
- Builder: St. Johns River Shipbuilding Company, Jacksonville, Florida
- Cost: $936,892
- Yard number: 74
- Way number: 2
- Laid down: 9 November 1944
- Launched: 11 December 1944
- Sponsored by: Agnes Veronica O'Mahoney
- Completed: 19 December 1944
- Identification: Call sign: KYUP
- Fate: Torpedoed and sunk, 6 February 1945, by German submarine U-245

General characteristics
- Class & type: Liberty ship; type EC2-S-C1, standard
- Tonnage: 10,865 LT DWT; 7,176 GRT
- Displacement: 3,380 long tons (3,434 t) (light); 14,245 long tons (14,474 t) (max)
- Length: 441 feet 6 inches (135 m) oa; 416 feet (127 m) pp; 427 feet (130 m) lwl
- Beam: 57 feet (17 m)
- Draft: 27 ft 9.25 in (8.4646 m)
- Installed power: 2 × Oil fired 450 °F (232 °C) boilers, operating at 220 psi (1,500 kPa); 2,500 hp (1,900 kW)
- Propulsion: 1 × triple-expansion steam engine, (manufactured by General Machinery Corp., Hamilton, Ohio); 1 × screw propeller
- Speed: 11.5 knots (21.3 km/h; 13.2 mph)
- Capacity: 562,608 cubic feet (15,931 m^{3}) (grain); 499,573 cubic feet (14,146 m^{3}) (bale)
- Complement: 38–62 USMM; 21–40 USNAG
- Armament: Varied by ship; Bow-mounted 3-inch (76 mm)/50-caliber gun; Stern-mounted 4-inch (102 mm)/50-caliber gun; 2–8 × single 20-millimeter (0.79 in) Oerlikon anti-aircraft (AA) cannons and/or, 2–8 × 37-millimeter (1.46 in) M1 AA guns

SS Henry B. Plant was a Liberty ship built in the United States during World War II. She was named after Henry B. Plant, an American businessman, entrepreneur, investor involved with many transportation interests and projects, mostly railroads, in the southeastern United States. In the 1880s, most of his accumulated railroad and steamship lines were combined into the Plant System, which later became part of the Atlantic Coast Line Railroad.

== Construction ==
Henry B. Plant was laid down on 9 November 1944, under a Maritime Commission (MARCOM) contract, MC hull 2510, by the St. Johns River Shipbuilding Company, Jacksonville, Florida; she was sponsored by Agnes Veronica O'Mahoney, the wife of the US Senator Joseph C. O'Mahoney, from Wyoming, and was launched on 11 December 1944.

== History ==
She was allocated to the A.L.Burbank & Co.Ltd., on 19 December 1944. On 6 February 1945, she was torpedoed and sunk by German submarine U-245, in the Straits of Dover, at 51°19′N 1°42′E, and declared an Actual Total Loss. Henry B. Plant had been transporting 9,300 LT (9,400 t) of cargo, originating in New York, to Antwerp. She was the last ship of Convoy TAM-71 about 17 nmi (31 km; 20 mi) from Ramsgate, when lookouts spotted a U-boat 300 yd (270 m) off starboard. With no time to evade, a torpedo struck the #4 hold. At the time she had a crew of eight officers, 33 crewmen, and 28 Armed Guards, she was also carrying one passenger, an Army security officer. One lifeboat and four rafts were launched, but one officer, eight crewmen, and seven Armed Guards were drowned. The remaining were picked up by HMS Hazard (J02) and HMS Sir Lancelot (LT228).

== See also ==
- SS Mascotte

== Bibliography ==
- "St. John's River Shipbuilding, Jacksonville FL". www.ShipbuildingHistory.com. 16 October 2010.
- Maritime Administration. "Henry B. Plant". Ship History Database Vessel Status Card. U.S. Department of Transportation, Maritime Administration.
- Davies, James (May 2004). "Specifications (As-Built)" (PDF). p. 23.
- "SS Henry B. Plant".
- "SS Henry B. Plant". www.Wrecksite.eu.
- "SS Henry B. Plant". www.Uboat.net.
