= Henry B. Plant =

American businessman (1819–1899)

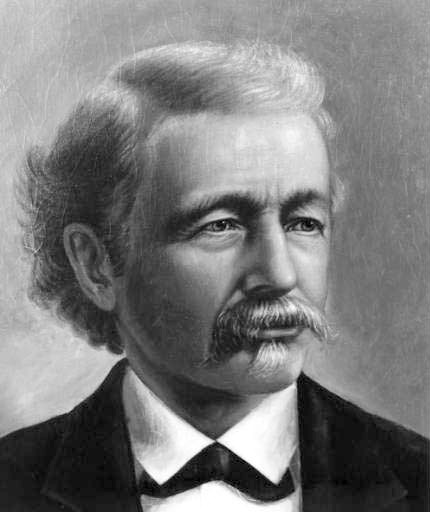
- Born: Henry Bradley Plant; October 27, 1819; Branford, Connecticut, US
- Died: June 23, 1899 (aged 79); New York City, US
- Occupations: Businessman; entrepreneur; investor
- Employer: Plant System (founder)
- Spouses: Ellen Elizabeth Blackstone (m. 1842; died 1861); Margaret Josephine Loughman (m. 1873)
- Children: Morton

Henry Bradley Plant (October 27, 1819 – June 23, 1899) was a businessman, entrepreneur, and investor involved with many transportation interests and projects, mostly railroads in the southeastern United States. He was founder of the Plant System of railroads and steamboats.

Plant was born in 1819 in Branford, Connecticut. He entered the railroad service in 1844, serving as express messenger on the Hartford and New Haven Railroad until 1853, during which time he had entire charge of the express business of that road. He went south in 1853 and established express lines on various southern railways, and he organized the Southern Express Co. in 1861 and became its president. In 1879, he purchased the Atlantic and Gulf Railroad of Georgia, and later reorganized the Savannah, Florida and Western Railroad, of which he became president. He purchased and rebuilt the Savannah and Charleston Railroad in 1880, now Charleston and Savannah. Not long after this, he organized the Plant Investment Co. to control these railroads and to advance their interests generally, and he later established a steamboat line on the St. John's river in Florida. From 1853 until 1860, he was general superintendent of the southern division of the Adams Express Co., and became president of the Texas Express Co. in 1867. In the 1880s, most of his accumulated railroad and steamship lines were combined into the Plant System, which later became part of the Atlantic Coast Line Railroad.

Plant is particularly known for connecting the previously isolated Tampa Bay area and southwest Florida to the nation's railroad system and establishing regular steamship service between Tampa, Cuba, and Key West, helping to spark significant population and economic growth in the region. To promote passenger traffic, Plant built the large Tampa Bay Hotel resort along his rail line through Tampa and several smaller hotels farther south, starting the area's tourist industry. His rival Henry Flagler similarly sparked growth along Florida's opposite coast by building the Florida East Coast Railroad, along with several resorts along its route.

== Early life ==
Henry Bradley Plant was born in Branford, Connecticut, to Betsey (née Bradley) and Anderson Plant, a farmer in good circumstances. He was the descendant of John Plant who probably emigrated from England and settled at Hartford, Connecticut, about 1639. When the boy was six, his father and younger sister died of typhus. Several years later his mother married again and took him to live first at Martinsburg, New York, and later at New Haven, Connecticut, where he attended a private school. His grandmother, Betsy Plant, who hoped to make a clergyman of him, offered him an education at Yale College, but, impatient to begin an active career, he got a job as captain's boy, deck hand, and man-of-all-work on a steamboat, The New York, plying between New Haven and New York City.

== Pre Civil War ==
Among his various duties was the care of express parcels. This line of business, hitherto neglected, he organized effectively. After marrying Ellen Blackstone in 1843, Plant decided to stay ashore and took a position with Beecher and Company, an express company located in New Haven which was taken over by the Adams Express Company. Plant was transferred from steamboats to railroads. After a few years he was put in charge of the old York office of the company. In 1853 his wife, Ellen Elizabeth (Blackstone) Plant was ordered South for her health. After a journey of eight days, the Plants arrived in Jacksonville in March and spent several months at a private home near Jacksonville, Florida, then a tiny hamlet. Plant was impressed with the possibilities of the future development of Florida.

The next year, after it became necessary for his wife to again travel south for her health, he requested and obtained the responsibility for all Adams Express Company's interests in the territory south of the Potomac and Ohio rivers. In the face of great difficulties, he successfully organized and extended express service across this region, where transportation facilities, although rapidly growing, were still deficient and uncoordinated. At the approach of the Civil War the directors of Adams Express, fearing the confiscation of their Southern properties, decided to sell them to Plant for his promissory note of $500,000. With Southern stockholders of the company he organized in 1861 the Southern Express Company, a Georgia corporation, and named himself president. Because he had built a reputation for providing reliable and efficient express service, the cabinet of Confederate president Jefferson Davis made Plant's company the agent for the Confederacy in collecting tariffs and transferring funds. In 1863, claiming a serious illness, he left his home in Augusta with a safe passage document signed by Jefferson Davis and sailed to Bermuda. After spending a month there, he traveled to Canada, Connecticut, and then England. When in France, he was informed that his Confederate passport was not valid. After some discussion with French authorities, an unusual resolution was reached as he was issued a French passport declaring him a U.S. citizen residing in Georgia which allowed him to travel extensively across Europe and later re-enter the United States when he returned to New York by way of Canada.

== Post Civil War ==
After the war, Plant returned to the South in February, 1865 to reclaim his business interests, primarily the Southern Express. The railroads of the South had been practically ruined and many railroads went bankrupt in the depression of 1873. In this situation, he found his opportunity. Convinced of the eventual economic revival of the South, he bought at foreclosure sales in 1879 and 1880 the Atlantic and Gulf Railroad and the Charleston and Savannah Railroad. With these as a nucleus he began building along the southern Atlantic seaboard a transportation system that twenty years later included fourteen railway companies with 2,100 mi (3,400 km) of track, several steamship lines, and a number of important hotels. In 1882 he organized, with the assistance of Northern capitalists (among whom were M. K. Jesup, W. T. Walters, and Henry Morrison Flagler, who himself would be instrumental in the development of Florida's east coast) the Plant Investment Company, a holding company for the joint management of the various properties under his control. He reconstructed and extended several small railroads so as to provide continuous service across the state, and by providing better connections with through lines to the North he gave Florida orange growers quicker and cheaper access to Northern markets.

In 1887, Plant built the PICO Hotel in Sanford for the accommodation of his railroad and steamship passengers to Central Florida. Subsequently, he either built or purchased the Inn at Port Tampa (1888), Hotel Kissimmee (1890), Seminole Hotel (1891), Hotel Punta Gorda (1894), The Ocala House (1895), and the Fort Myers Hotel (1898).

Tampa, then a village of a few hundred inhabitants, was made the terminus of his southern Florida railroad and also the home port for a new line of steamships to Havana. For the accommodation of winter visitors he built in Tampa, in the style of a Moorish palace, an enormous hotel costing over $3,000,000 and covering 6 acres (2.4 ha) situated on 150 acres (61 ha). Opened on February 5, 1891, it was the first hotel in Florida to have an elevator, electric lights, and a telephone in each room. The hotel was called the Tampa Bay Hotel and was famous for its fanciful Moorish and Victorian architecture. In 1898, this hotel gained international fame as the stateside military headquarters for the U.S. invasion force during the Spanish–American War. The hotel now serves as the main building for the University of Tampa and houses the Henry B. Plant Museum. Another large, Victorian-style hotel established by Plant was opened in 1897, the Belleview Biltmore near Clearwater, Florida.

The subsequent growth in wealth and population of Florida and other states tributary to the Plant System made its founder one of the richest and most powerful men in the South. A good physical inheritance, preserved by temperate habits, made it possible for Henry Plant to keep working until almost eighty years of age.

== Later life ==
His first wife died in February 1861, and in 1873 he married Margaret Josephine Loughman, the daughter of Martin Loughman of New York City, who with one of his two sons survived him. He was honored at the Cotton States and International Exhibition in 1895 in Atlanta, GA with his own, Henry Plant Day.

Henry Plant built or bought eight hotels, including several in Tampa, Florida and the new town of Port Tampa, which he built at the end of his rail line. His most prized hotel was the Tampa Bay Hotel, a lavish resort built right across the Hillsborough River from Tampa. Built at a cost of $3 million, it was said to be an attempt to compete with fellow industrialist Henry M. Flagler, who was developing Florida's east coast.

Plant died from heart disease in New York City on June 23, 1899.

In his will he attempted to prevent the partition of his properties to the value of about $10,000,000 by forming a trust for the benefit of his grandson, Henry Plant II (born 1895), but the will was contested by his widow and son and declared invalid under the laws of the state of New York. This decision made possible the consolidation of his railroads with other properties to form the Atlantic Coast Line Railroad, today a key portion of the Florida operations of CSX Transportation.

Plant's son, Morton Freeman Plant (1852–1918), was vice-president of the Plant Investment Company from 1884 to 1902 and attained distinction as a yachtsman. He was part owner of the Philadelphia baseball club in the National League, and sole owner of the New London club in the Eastern League. Of the younger Plant's many gifts to hospitals and other institutions the most notable were the three dormitories and the unrestricted gift of $1,000,000 to the Connecticut College for Women. His former 1905 mansion on Fifth Avenue in New York City is now the home of Cartier.

== Honors ==
- Henry B. Plant High School in Tampa, Florida and Plant City, Florida are named after him.
- The Henry B. Plant Museum is located in the main building of the former Tampa Bay Hotel on the campus of the University of Tampa. The building is now called Plant Hall in his honor.
- Morton Plant Hospital in Clearwater, Florida is named after Henry Plant's son, whose donation helped to build the hospital.
- Henry Avenue in Tampa, Florida is in his namesake.
- The World War II Liberty Ships SS Henry B. Plant and SS Henry B. Plant II was named in his honor.
- Plant Street, a major road running through the middle of the Winter Garden Downtown Historic District, bears his name.
