= RV Sir Lancelot =

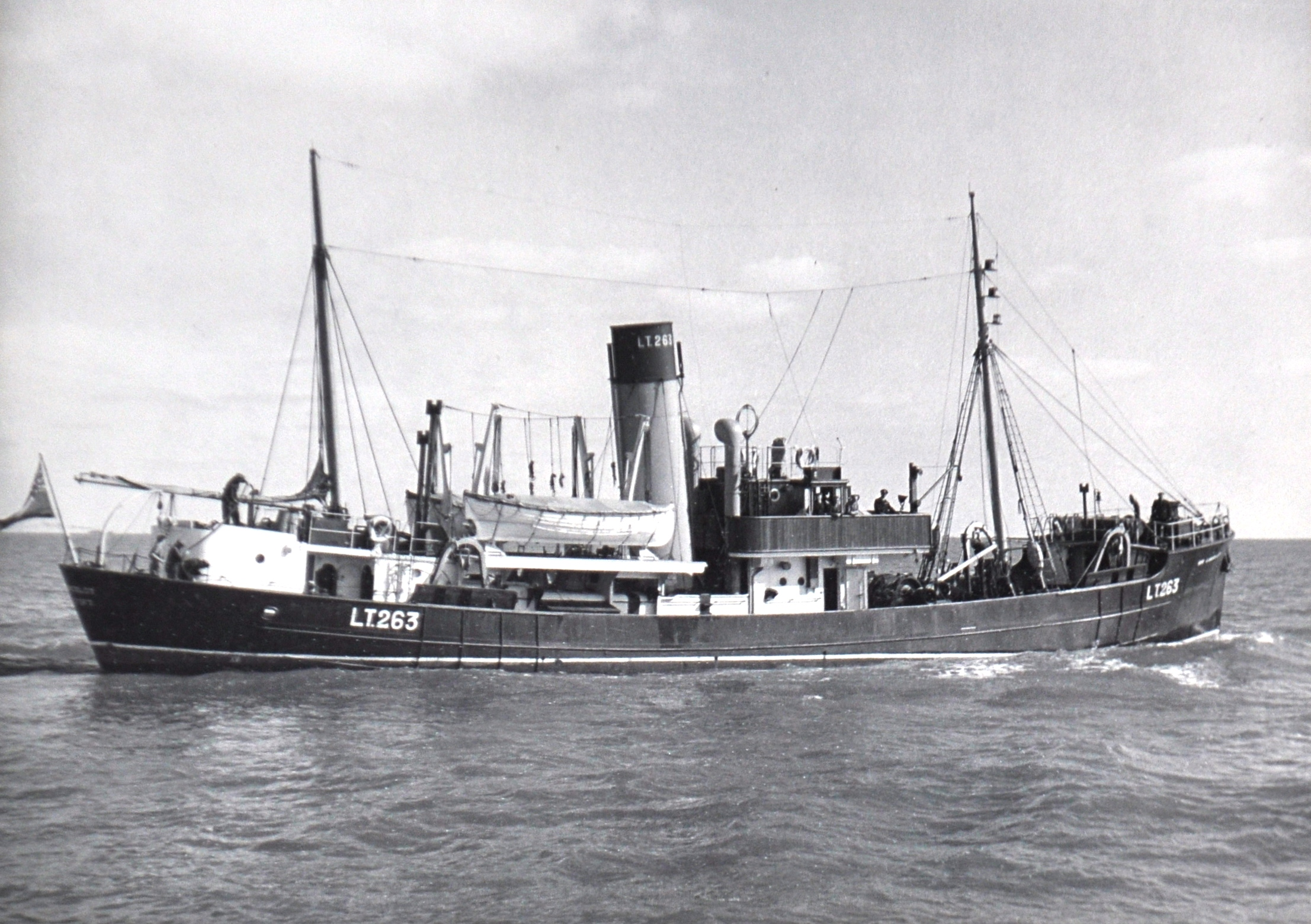
- RV Sir Lancelot: Official photo taken in the 1950s

History

United Kingdom
- Name: RV Sir Lancelot
- Operator: Royal Navy; Ministry of Agriculture, Fisheries and Food (United Kingdom)
- Builder: J. Lewis & Sons Ltd., Aberdeen
- Yard number: 160
- Laid down: 17 July 1941
- Launched: 4 December 1941
- Commissioned: 26 March 1942
- Homeport: Lowestoft
- Fate: Sold 1962

General characteristics
- Class & type: Round Table-class trawler
- Type: Minesweeper; Danlayer; Research vessel
- Displacement: 440 long tons (447 t)
- Length: 125 ft (38.1 m)
- Beam: 23 ft 6 in (7.2 m)
- Draught: 13 ft 9 in (4.2 m)
- Complement: 35 naval personnel
- Armament: 1 × 12 pdr anti-aircraft gun; 1 × 20 mm anti-aircraft gun; 2 × machine guns

RV Sir Lancelot (LT263) was a fisheries research vessel that was operated by the Directorate of Fisheries, now known as the Centre for Environment, Fisheries and Aquaculture Science (Cefas).

It was based at the port of Lowestoft and was originally ordered by the Admiralty as one of eight Round Table-class trawlers during World War II

HMS Sir Lancelot (T228) took part in Operation Neptune, the D-Day landings in June 1944, attached to the 14th Minesweeping flotilla in Force U. She was primarily responsible for marking swept passages to Utah Beach.

After the war and conversion to a civilian trawler Sir Lancelot came into service as a research vessel in December 1946. In 1962, she was sold to Mrs Karin Meta Alexa Husseini, Hamburg and renamed 'Hair-Ed-Din Barbarossa'.

== Construction and wartime history ==
The ship was constructed by J. Lewis & Sons Ltd of Aberdeen, Scotland. The order was placed by the Admirably on 20 January 1941 and was allocated the yard number 160 by Lewis'. The keel was laid down on 17 July 1941 with the ship launched on 4 December 1941 and commissioned into the Royal Navy on 26 March 1942.

In June 1944 HMS Sir Lancelot (T228) was converted to a danlayer ahead of the D-Day landings. She was attached to the 14th Minesweeping flotilla in Force U and was one of the first Allied vessels to approach the French coast. In respect of each of the five beach Assault Forces (designated U, O, G, J and S), two channels would be cleared through the mine barrier for the first wave of amphibious infantry. HMS Sir Lancelot was responsible for marking swept Channel 2 ahead of force 'U' on Utah Beach.

On 5 February 1945, HMS Sir Lancelot (T228) picked up survivors from the American merchant ship SS Henry B. Plant, that was torpedoed and sunk by German submarine U-245, about 17 nmi (31 km; 20 mi) east of Ramsgate in position 51°19′N 01°42′E.

== Service as a fisheries research vessel ==
RV Sir Lancelot was the primary fisheries survey vessel used by the Ministry of Agriculture, Fisheries and Food (United Kingdom) throughout the period 1947 to 1960. She was used extensively to assess the status of fish stocks in the North Sea, Irish Sea and English Channel as part of the UK contribution to the International Council for the Exploration of the Sea (ICES)

In 1950, RV Sir Lancelot was used together with 'frogmen' to take photographs and Ciné film of trawl gears in action off Cornwall. In 1951, she was re-deployed off Malta as there was a need for good underwater visibility. The film obtained showed the meshes of the net to be wide open whilst it was being towed and so helped in the acceptance of mesh regulation by fishermen everywhere.

Datasets collected aboard the RV Sir Lancelot were instrumental in the ground-breaking book On the Dynamics of Exploited Fish Populations written by Ray Beverton and Sidney Holt in 1957.

== See also ==
- Trawlers of the Royal Navy
