= RV Onaway =

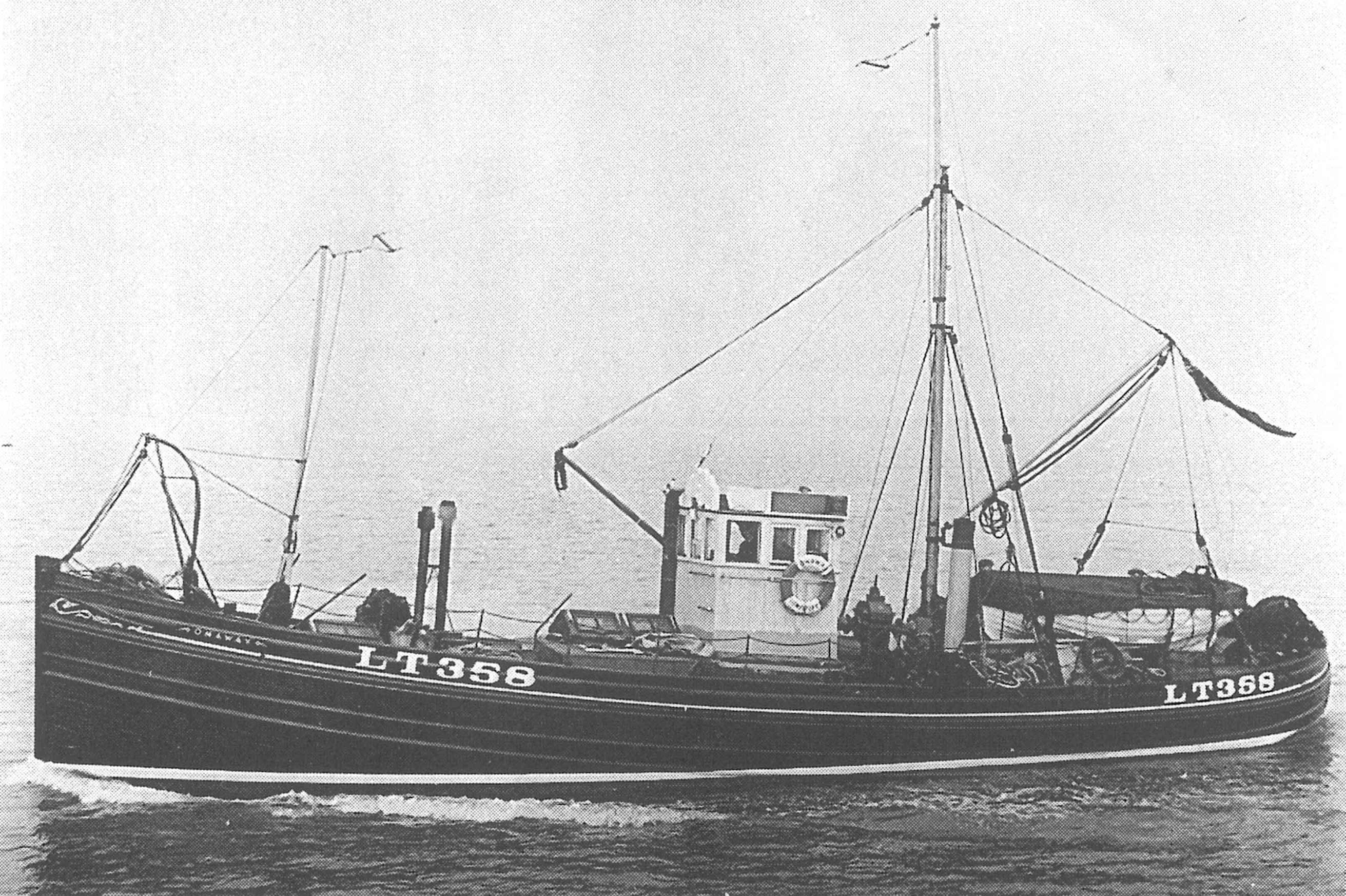
- RV Onaway

History

United Kingdom
- Name: RV Onaway (LT358)
- Owner: Mr William, W Carstairs of Cellardyke; Ministry of Agriculture, Fisheries and Food (United Kingdom)
- Operator: Ministry of Agriculture, Fisheries and Food (United Kingdom); Royal Navy
- Builder: Walter Reekie, Anstruther, Scotland
- Launched: 1928
- Commissioned: 1930
- In service: 1930-1960
- Home port: Lowestoft
- Fate: Unknown

General characteristics
- Type: Fishing drifter; Research Vessel; Boom defence tender
- Tonnage: 26.73 long tons (27 t)
- Length: 53 ft 2 in (16.2 m)
- Beam: 16 ft 4 in (5.0 m)
- Draught: 6 ft 10 in (2.1 m)
- Propulsion: Norris, Henty and Gardner semi-diesel, 47 BHP. 450 RPM

RV Onaway (LT358) was a fisheries research vessel that was operated by the Ministry of Agriculture, Fisheries and Food (United Kingdom) - Directorate of Fisheries, now known as the Centre for Environment, Fisheries and Aquaculture Science (Cefas) between 1930 and 1960. She was briefly requisitioned by the Admiralty, to serve as a Boom Defence Tender during World War II (between 1939 and 1945), but returned to Ministry service in 1946. In 1960 the RV Onaway was replaced by the RV Tellina.

== Construction ==
In 1928 large crowds witnessed the launch of the motor fishing bauldie Onaway from the boatbuilding yard of Walter Reekie, Anstruther, Scotland. She was built to the order of Mr William, W Carstairs of Cellardyke and was a sister ship of the Winaway, a 53 ft long steam drifter. Onaway was fitted with a 48 hp semi-diesel engine and special design of steam boiler and capstan. Miss Jessie Watson of Cellardyke, sister of the skipper performed the christening ceremony.

== Service as a fisheries research vessel ==
In 1930 Onaway was purchased by the Ministry of Agriculture, Fisheries and Food (United Kingdom).

The RV Onaway (LT358) was in service with MAFF from December 1930 until March 1960, during which time she participated in 209 separate research campaigns. During the 1930s she was largely confined to inshore coastal waters of the southern North Sea including East Anglia, the Thames estuary, southern bight and Straits of Dover. Most of her early efforts were dedicated to the surveying of herring and sprat, but also plankton sampling and characterizing hydrology.

After World War II, RV Onaway ventured further afield with regular sampling voyages to Cornwall and throughout the English Channel (Sussex to South Cornwall) focused on pilchard/sardine investigations, although continuing to participate in surveys of North Sea herring and sprat. In the 1950s she was used as a platform for large-scale tagging programmes targeting North Sea sole, crab, rays, herring and whiting. Between 1952 and 1959 she conducted annual surveys to characterize scallop populations in the English Channel. In March 1959 the RV Onaway was used to carry out surveys of colliery waste dumping sites off the northeast coast of England.

== Service during World War II ==
In 1939 the RV Onaway was requisitioned by the Admiralty, to serve as a Boom Defence Tender. The primary function of a Boom Defence Vessel was to lay and maintain steel anti-torpedo or anti-submarine nets. Nets could be laid around an individual ship at anchor, or around harbors or other anchorages. In January 1942 Onaway was listed among many similar Boom Defence Vessels allocated to the Scapa Flow Auxiliary Patrol (Orkney). Specifically, Onaway is listed as being "at Macduff (Aberdeenshire) refitting - to complete 14 Jan”.

Following return from Admiralty service in 1946, the RV Onaway was immediately lengthened by 10 ft. and her engine changed from a 40 hp semi-diesel to a 120 hp diesel, with the result that her speed was increased from 5 to 9.5 knots.

== See also ==
- Centre for Environment, Fisheries and Aquaculture Science
