= Centre for Environment, Fisheries and Aquaculture Science =

UK government agency

The logo of the Centre for Environment, Fisheries and Aquaculture Science.

The Centre for Environment, Fisheries and Aquaculture Science (Cefas) is an executive agency of the United Kingdom government Department for Environment, Food and Rural Affairs (Defra). It carries out a wide range of research, advisory, consultancy, monitoring and training activities for a large number of customers around the world.

Cefas employs over 550 staff based primarily at two specialist laboratories within the UK, with additional staff based at small, port-based offices in Scarborough, Hayle, and Plymouth. In 2014 Cefas established a permanent base in the Middle East by opening an office in Kuwait, and since opened an office in Oman. They also operate an ocean-going research vessel Cefas Endeavour.

== Customers ==
The primary customer for Cefas is their parent organisation Defra. They also undertake work for international and UK government departments (central and local), the World Bank, the European Commission, the United Nations Food and Agriculture Organization (FAO), commercial organisations, non-governmental and environmental organisations, regulators and enforcement agencies, local authorities and other public bodies.

There is an increasing focus on commercial research and consultancy as the level of funding available from Defra gradually reduces.

== History ==
Known previously as the Directorate of Fisheries Research, the name and status was changed in 1997 to 'Centre for Environment, Fisheries and Aquaculture Science' (Cefas). At this time it became an Executive Agency of what was then the Ministry of Agriculture, Fisheries and Food (United Kingdom) and is now the Department of Environment, Food and Rural Affairs (Defra).

=== Lowestoft laboratory ===
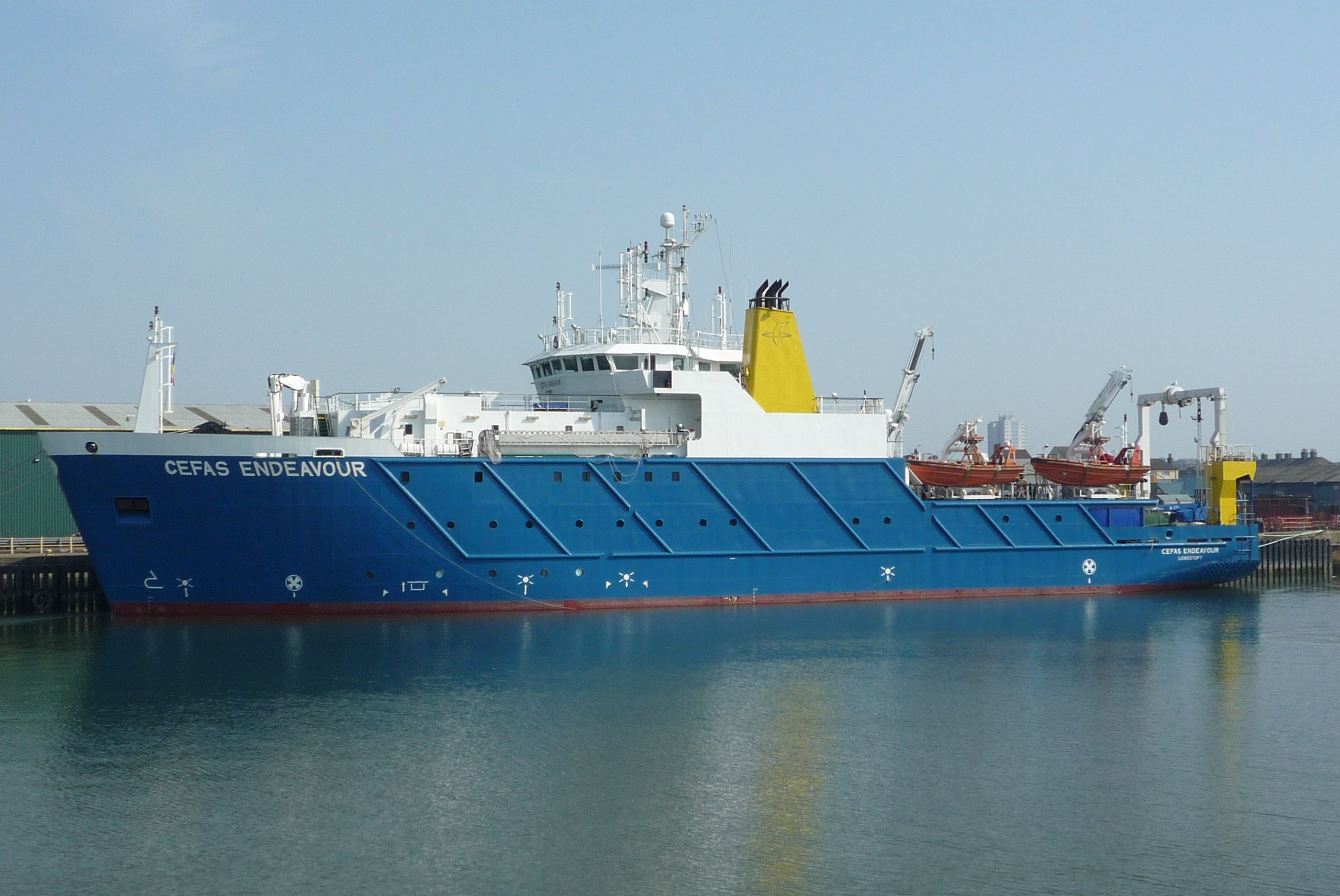
Cefas Endeavour moored in the Inner Harbour, Lowestoft

In 1902, the Marine Biological Association opened a sub-station in Pakefield a suburb of Lowestoft, Suffolk to research the Fishing industry. This was part of the UK contribution to the newly created International Council for the Exploration of the Sea (ICES). By 1921 the station had been expanded to include a laboratory with experimental facilities.

Early research was focused on aspects of the marine biology of the North Sea. During the 1920s and 1930s biological studies expanded, the theory of fishing was developed and forecasting fish stocks became routine.

In 1927–1928 Michael Graham was dispatched from the Lowestoft laboratory by the Colonial Office and conducted the first ever systematic Fisheries Survey of Lake Victoria.

After the second world war, radiobiological facilities were installed to advise on the safe disposal of radioactive substances at sea. Research aboard the newly acquired Arctic-going Research Vessel Ernest Holt established an important link between fishable cod concentrations and water temperatures and identified cod migration routes. The migration routes of plaice stocks were identified and the deterioration in the North Sea herring fishery was investigated. From this ground-breaking work came theories of fishing and fish population trends that have become international recognised.

The laboratory moved to its current site on the cliffs in the Kirkley area 1955. The site was expanded in the 1960s and 1980s to meet the needs of emerging work programmes monitoring the quality of the marine environment. Although the period 1964–1982 probably saw the fullest flowering of fisheries research, per se, at Lowestoft, the increasing awareness of both politicians and the public about the importance of maintaining the quality of the marine environment, meant that an increasing proportion of the work programme of that period was devoted to problems associated with investigating both radioactive and non-radioactive contamination at sea.

=== Conwy laboratory ===
Research at Conwy started in 1918 to find a more effective method of mussel purification. The Conway Corporation mussel purification tanks were taken over by the then Board of Agriculture and Fisheries and research. Research expanded into developing hatchery culture techniques, initially on the native oyster, and subsequently, in the 1960s, on the Pacific oyster, work which now forms the basis of the UK bivalve cultivation industry.

The laboratory was expanded in the 1970s in order to increase the capacity to research other aspects of shellfish cultivation. This included responsibilities for dealing with ecological and management problems in various shellfisheries. More recent research shifted emphasis away from shellfish cultivation to the ecology of coastal waters and coastal zone management. This work was transferred to the Weymouth laboratory when the Conwy facilities were closed in 2000.

=== Weymouth laboratory ===
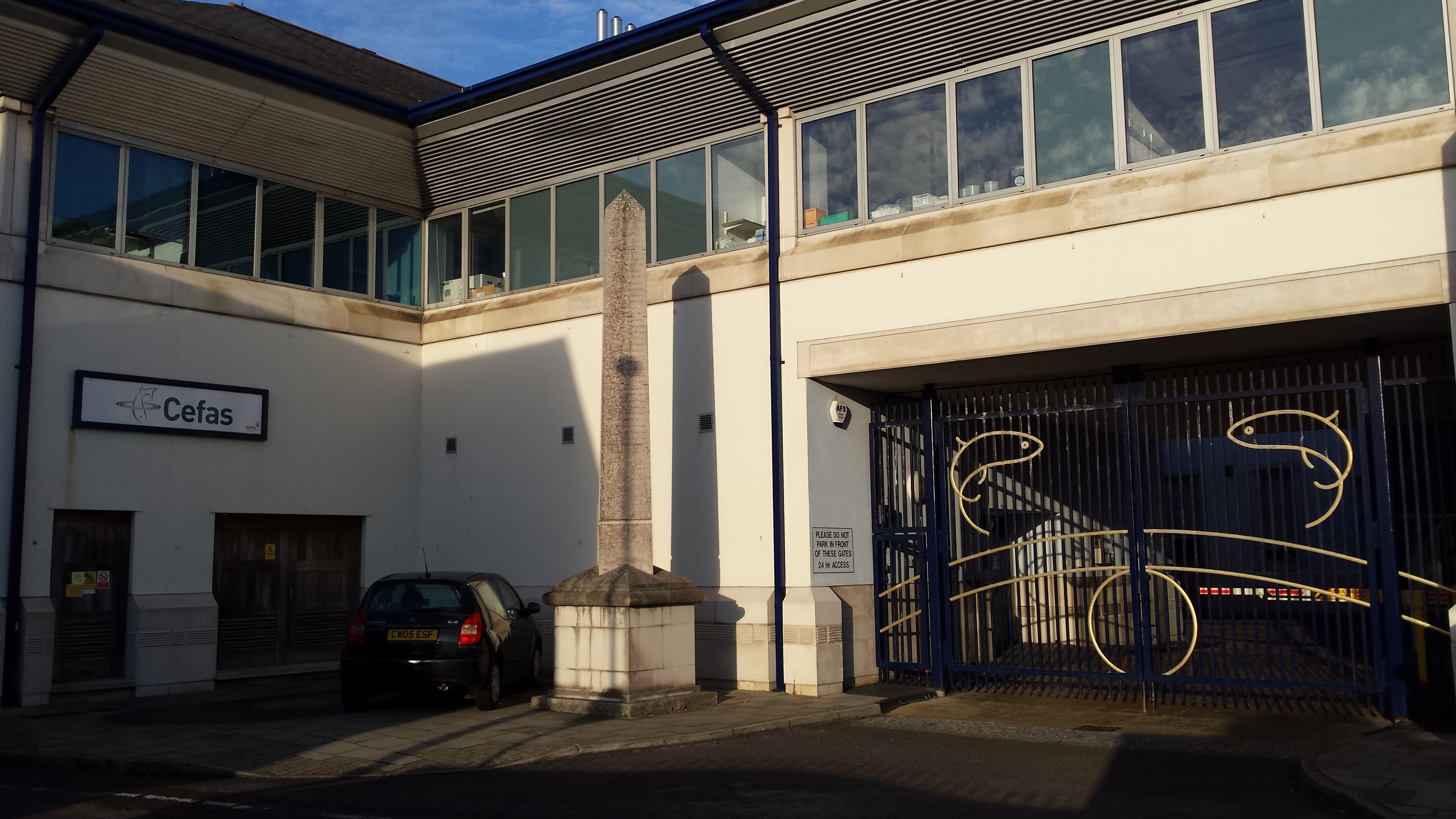
Cefas, Weymouth

The Weymouth laboratory was established in 1969 with four staff, specifically to study the cause of a disease in salmon. The laboratory was expanded in the 1970s and 1980s to investigate serious disease risks threatening the expanding fish farming industry. During the 1980s research shifted towards determining drug residues in fish for human consumption and environmental problems associated with release of medicines from fish farms.

Further expansion occurred during the 90s from new inspection and monitoring responsibilities stemming from EC directives. These dealt with marine and freshwater fish health, and microbiological hygiene of molluscan shellfish. This resulted in the existing facilities becoming over stretched. In 1994 a new laboratory, housing state-of the art equipment and the most modern facilities, was opened.

The Weymouth Laboratory is the European Union and UK national reference laboratory for monitoring bacteriological and viral contamination of bivalve molluscs.

==== Fish Health Inspectorate ====
The Weymouth Laboratory is the base for the Fish Health Inspectorate (FHI). FHI's primary role is undertake statutory and inspection duties resulting from the EU Fish Health regime and other national legislation in the area of fish and shellfish health. The Inspectorate also licenses and monitors imports of fish and shellfish from other countries and runs an enforcement programme aimed at preventing the illegal importation of these animals.

=== Burnham-on-Crouch laboratory ===
The Burnham laboratory was established in 1953 as the Ministry's first-ever purpose-built fisheries laboratory. The role of the laboratory was expanded in 1957 to cover work on pollution, and by the mid-60s began to take the lead in the investigation of environmental protection problems, with the exception of those arising from radioactive waste. Early studies concentrated on determining the toxic effects of various contaminants and surveying their levels in coastal waters and inshore fisheries. By 1970, the general aim of the work had become the establishing of the effects on commercial fish and shellfish resources of disposal of wastes, mineral and hydrocarbon extraction, and engineering and development work. This involved environmental impact assessments and a major monitoring programme.

The Burnham Laboratory hosts the UK Offshore Chemical Notification Scheme which manages chemical use and discharge by the UK offshore petroleum industry. The scheme is regulated by the Department of Energy and Climate Change (DECC), using scientific and environmental advice from Cefas and the Fisheries Research Services (FRS).

The laboratory was closed in December 2008 and the work moved to the Lowestoft Laboratory.

=== Ships ===
Ships that have been operated by the Centre for Environment, Fisheries and Aquaculture Science:

Ship	from	to
RV Huxley	1902	1909)
SY Hildegarde	1912	1914
SY Hiawatha	1914	
SS Joseph & Sarah Miles	1920	1922)
RV George Bligh	1921	1939
RV Onaway	1930	1960
RV Platessa	1946	1967
RV Ernest Holt	1946	1971
RV Sir Lancelot	1947	1960
RV Tellina	1960	1981
RV Clione	1961	1988
RV Corella	1967	1983
RV Cirolana	1970	2003
RV Corystes	1988	2003
RV Cefas Endeavour	2003	present)

=== Notable alumni ===
- Ray Beverton FRS, co-author of the groundbreaking book On the Dynamics of Exploited Fish Populations in 1957
- David Cushing FRS, credited with development of the match/mismatch hypothesis as an explanation for how poor stock recruitment can be associated with climatic variability and a lack of plankton resources for fish larvae.
- Walter Garstang, poet and naturalist, who established the laboratory in 1902 on behalf of the Marine Biological Association of the United Kingdom.
- Michael Graham CMG OBE, former director of the Lowestoft fisheries laboratory (1945–1958). His classic book, “The Fish Gate”, published in 1943, paints a picture of the near collapse of the British fishing industry, through overfishing, that occurred before both the First and the Second World Wars.
- John Gulland FRS, distinguished mathematician who worked on fisheries stock assessments and whaling.
- Sir Alister Hardy FRS, who while working for the laboratory studied North Sea herring and developed the Continuous Plankton Recorder.
- Ernest William Lyons Holt, who worked until 1894 in Grimsby, where he was in charge of a newly opened research station for the North Sea (forerunner of the laboratory in Lowestoft).
- Sidney Holt, co-author of the groundbreaking book On the Dynamics of Exploited Fish Populations in 1957
- Rosa Lee, the first woman scientist employed by the Marine Biological Association and the first woman to work as a government fishery scientist in the United Kingdom.
- E. S. Russell OBE, former director of the Lowestoft fisheries laboratory (1921–1945).
- John Shepherd FRS, deputy director of the fisheries laboratory in Lowestoft, specialising in the marine disposal of radioactive waste, mathematical modelling of fishing fleet operations, and fish population dynamics. Emeritus Professor of Earth System Science, School of Ocean and Earth Science, University of Southampton
- Dorothy Thursby-Pelham, ‘England’s first female sea-going fisheries scientist’ who carried out exhaustive studies of North Sea plaice and was an active member of the International Council for the Exploration of the Sea in the 1920s.

== Cefas Technology Limited ==
Cefas Technology Limited (CTL) is a wholly owned subsidiary of Cefas that specialises in the application of Cefas technology to specific customer needs in a cost-effective and focussed manner. CTL was formed in order to utilise the intellectual property of Cefas, something that was difficult to achieve with Cefas's current legal status as an executive agency.

== See also ==
- Category:Ships of the Centre for Environment, Fisheries and Aquaculture Science
