= Round Table-class trawler =

1941 class of British naval trawlers

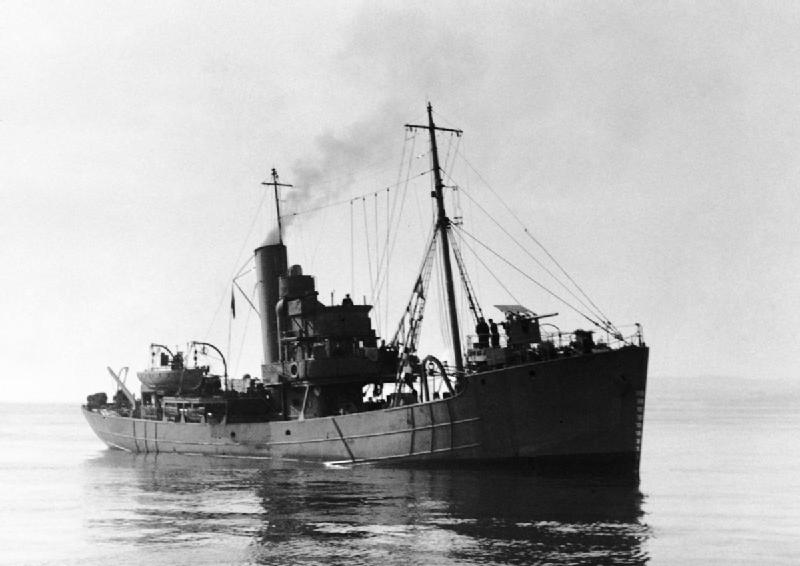
- HMS Sir Galahad

Class overview
- Builders: Hall, Russell & Company; J. Lewis & Sons Ltd
- Operators: Royal Navy
- Built: 1941–1942
- Completed: 8

General characteristics
- Type: Minesweeper; Danlayer
- Displacement: 440 long tons (447 t)
- Length: 125 ft (38.1 m)
- Beam: 23 ft 6 in (7.2 m)
- Draught: 13 ft 9 in (4.2 m)
- Complement: 35
- Armament: 1 × 12 pdr anti-aircraft gun; 1 × 20 mm anti-aircraft gun; 2 × machine guns

The Round Table class was a small class of trawlers built for the British Royal Navy in 1941–1942. The class were built by two Aberdeen shipbuilding firms Hall, Russell & Company and J. Lewis & Sons Ltd.

All were built to a 1936 design, the Star of Orkney, by Hall, Russell & Co but were commissioned as minesweepers. Two of the class, Sir Galahad and Sir Lancelot were converted to danlayers.

== Ships ==
The ships (and assigned pennant numbers) in the class were:

- Sir Agravaine (T230) launched 5 March 1942
- Sir Galahad (T226) launched 18 December 1941
- Sir Gareth (T227) launched 19 January 1942
- Sir Geraint (T240) launched 15 April 1942
- Sir Kay (T241) launched 26 October 1942
- Sir Lamorack (T242) launched 23 November 1942
- Sir Lancelot (T228) launched 4 December 1941
- Sir Tristram (T229) launched 17 January 1942

== See also ==
- Trawlers of the Royal Navy
