= RV Cefas Endeavour =

Research vessel built in 2003

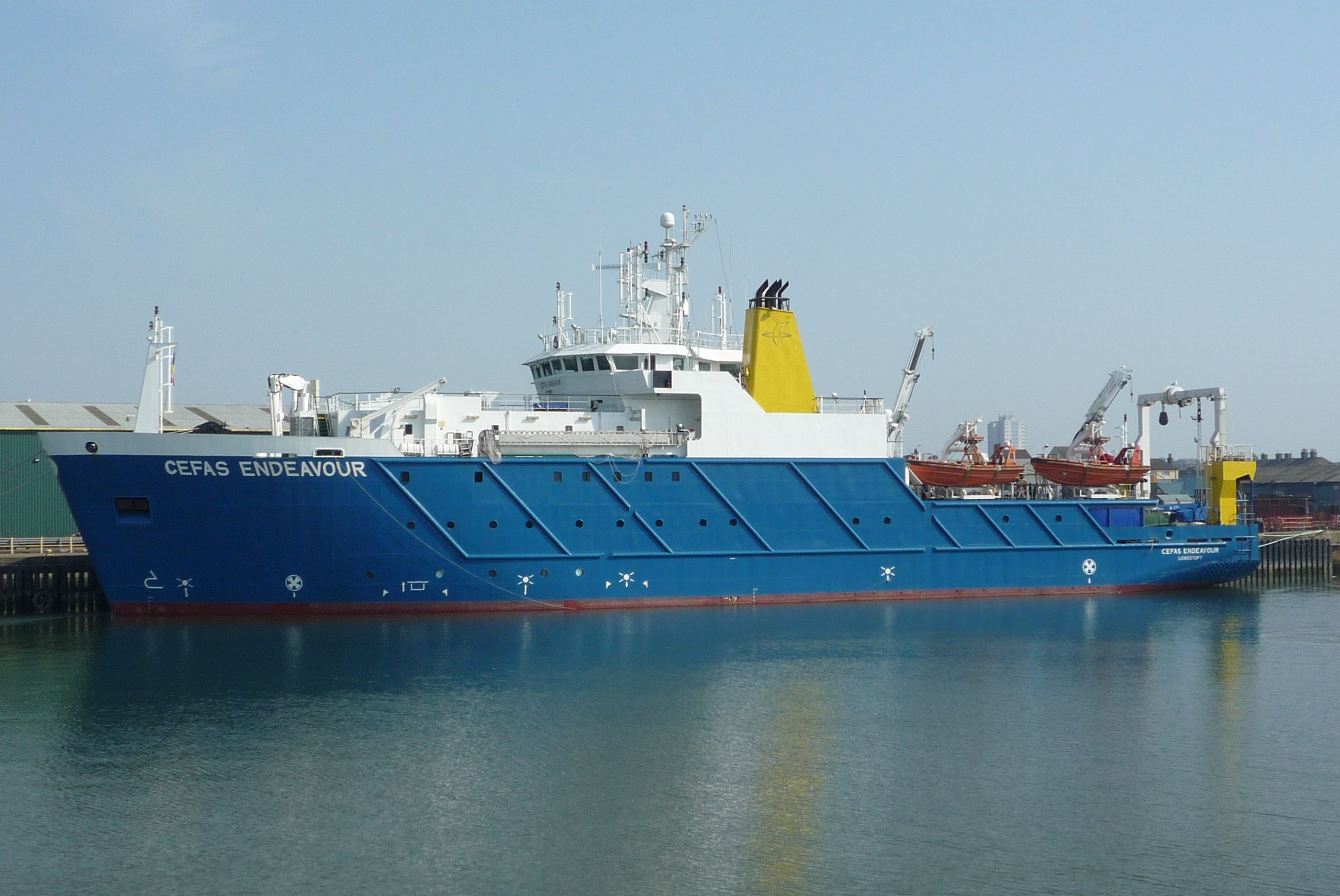
- Cefas Endeavour moored in the Inner Harbour, Lowestoft

History

United Kingdom
- Name: Cefas Endeavour
- Owner: Defra
- Operator: AW Ship Management
- Builder: Ferguson Shipbuilders, Port Glasgow
- Yard number: 712
- Launched: 14 August 2002
- In service: 2003
- Home port: Lowestoft
- Identification: IMO number: 9251107; MMSI number: 235005270; Callsign: VQHF3
- Status: Ship in service

General characteristics
- Tonnage: 2,983 GT, 894 NT
- Length: 73.92 m (242 ft 6 in)
- Beam: 16.11 m (52 ft 10 in)
- Draught: 5.5 m (18 ft 1 in)
- Propulsion: 3 × diesel AC generators; 2 × tandem electric DC motors, single screw; bow thruster; stern thruster
- Speed: 13.6 knots (15.7 mph; 25.2 km/h) max
- Endurance: 42 days
- Complement: 19 scientists, 16 crew
- Sensors & processing systems: Kongsberg EM2040 Multibeam echosounder // HiPAP 500 positioning sonar // EK60 38/120/200 scientific sounder // EA600 12/50/200 hydrographic sounder // SH80 high-frequency omni-directional sonar (scientific option) // Hull-mounted Scanmar fishing net mensuration computer + transducers // RDI workhorse ADCP (optional) // Olex seabed display/logging system (multi-beam option) // FerryBox
- Notes: The vessel's underwater radiated noise profile is compliant with standards established by the International Council for the Exploration of the Sea (ICES)

RV Cefas Endeavour is an ocean-going fisheries research vessel based at the port of Lowestoft and owned by the Centre for Environment, Fisheries and Aquaculture Science (Cefas).

She is used to support all aspects of Cefas activities from fish stock surveys to launching autonomous monitoring equipment. The ship was built to replace the former research vessel RV Cirolana, and was designed to minimise underwater noise, and therefore disturbance of fish – ensuring better results from sonar equipment. Operation is currently outsourced by Cefas to AW Ship Management following a tendering process carried out in 2019.

The vessel was previously operated by P&O Maritime Services.

Cefas Endeavour was constructed at Ferguson Shipbuilders in Glasgow. She was named by Lindsay Murray, Cefas' science area head for environmental management at Burnham-on-Crouch, who was also wife of the former chief executive Peter Greig-Smith. The naming ceremony took place on 20 June 2003, sponsored by Ben Bradshaw, then Under Secretary of State at the Department of Environment, Food and Rural Affairs.

== Operational history ==
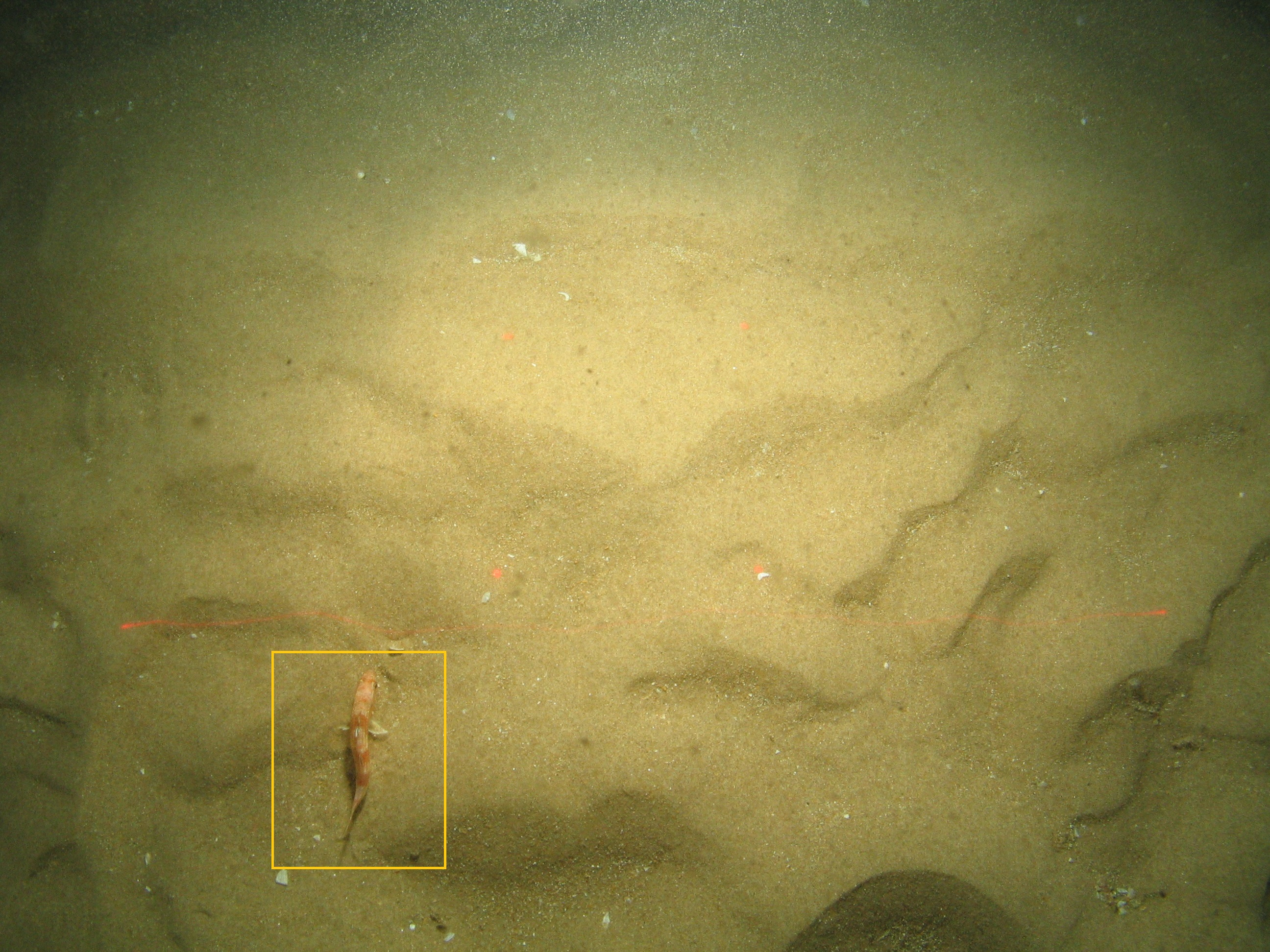
A striped red mullet (Mullus surmuletus) in the English Channel taken using imaging equipment aboard Cefas Endeavour

Since 2003 Cefas Endeavour has been the only research vessel operated by Cefas. She is used primarily for fisheries surveys, but also to carry out initial assessments of Marine Conservation Zones under the Marine and Coastal Access Act 2009 and Special Areas of Conservation in UK territorial waters. RV Cefas Endeavour is currently used to service offshore meteorological buoys, to deploy autonomous gliders and wave-riders. She participates in the Quarter 3 (August/September) – North Sea International Bottom Trawl Survey (IBTS), a commitment under the International Council for the Exploration of the Sea (ICES).

In February 2015 RV Cefas Endeavour was chartered by the Netherlands government in order to fulfill the Dutch component of the North Sea International Bottom Trawl Survey (IBTS). Cefas scientists worked alongside those from Rijkswaterstaat (RWS) and the Institute for Marine Resources & Ecosystem Studies (IMARES), with local mobilisation in Scheveningen (Netherlands). The charter was necessary as the Dutch fishery research vessel RV Tridens was undergoing a major refit to enhance her capabilities during this period. RV Cefas Endeavour was similarly chartered by the Netherlands government to fulfill the same function in 2016.

From 20 January – 19 February 2017 RV Cefas Endeavour was chartered by the Norwegian Government to fulfill the Norwegian component of the North Sea International Bottom Trawl Survey (IBTS), and operated in collaboration with the Institute of Marine Research, Bergen – as the Norwegian vessel G.O. SARS was not available.

From circa 2008 to 2011, Cefas Endeavour completed the East Coast Regional Environmental Characterisation survey undertaken to discover more about the seabed from north Norfolk to Walberswick, covering an area of 3,300 square kilometres (1,300 sq mi). Combining data with existing records, researchers were able to produce maps on tidal patterns, water temperature, and general biodiversity. The aim of the survey was to map and record features such as sub-tidal reefs and sandbanks. The team also discovered the wreck of HMS Exmoor, several Second World War aircraft, and hand axes, cores, and flakes dating from the Palaeolithic period. They also discovered a specimen of Rissoides desmaresti, a rare mantis shrimp that was previously unknown in the area.

In summer 2011, while the ship was carrying researchers from Marinelife she spotted 20 endangered fin whales, in five pods, for approximately 30 minutes.

== Rescues ==
The ship has been involved in a number of rescues:

- In April 2004, 207 miles south-west of the Scilly Isles, the yacht Silent Annie sent a mayday call after a man on board was suffering from chest pains. Cefas Endeavour responded, and the man was subsequently airlifted by a helicopter from RNAS Culdrose (HMS Seahawk) to the Royal Cornwall Hospital. The yacht later sent out another distress signal; after a search by Falmouth coastguard, the Spanish Coast Guard Service, a Hawker Siddeley Nimrod from RAF Kinloss and a merchant vessel (the Gemini 1), the yacht was found by the merchant vessel to have a broken mast, and the remaining crewman was taken on board before being airlifted to A Coruña by a Spanish rescue helicopter.
- In May 2013, the ship assisted with a search of the English Channel, approximately 30 miles south of Plymouth, where a man had been spotted in the water. No one was found.
- At 2000 hours on 4 May 2014, the ship responded to a distress call to two people on board a 22-foot (6.7 m) yacht which was adrift in Weymouth Bay after suffering a complete electrical failure. Her fast rescue boat was launched, and towed the boat back into her mooring at Castle Cove, Weymouth.
- In 2015, she assisted in the rescue of the 10-metre (33 ft) motor cruiser Lanpuki, whose three-person crew were unable to restart their failed engine. A tow-line was attached off Kessingland, and Cefas Endeavour towed the cruiser to the Stamford Channel, where they rendezvoused with the Lowestoft lifeboat Patsy Knight, which took the stricken yacht into the moorings at Lowestoft yacht club.
- In 2023, she responded to a mayday relay call from Solent Coastguard and provided a tow to a 31ft yacht which had lost its rudder south of Portland Bill. The yacht was towed to Weymouth Bay by the vessel, and towed to Portland marina by one of the vessels workboats.
