= Ernest Holt (cricketer) =

English cricketer

Ernest Gerald Holt (2 July 1904 – 27 August 1970) played first-class cricket for Somerset in two matches in the 1930 season. He was born in Burnham-on-Sea, Somerset and died at Brent Knoll, also in Somerset.

In a short first-class cricket career, Holt was a lower-order right-handed batsman. He made 8 and 4 in his first match, against Surrey in May 1930. But he failed to score in his only other match, the game against Cambridge University the following month. In August 1933, he was a member of a Marylebone Cricket Club (MCC) side that toured the Netherlands and played two two-day matches against "a Dutch XI" and the Dutch national side; Holt batted in the middle order in both matches and in the game against the national side he scored 35 in the second innings and was part of a stand that put on 88 after MCC had been forced to follow on, though the match was still lost.
