= RV Huxley =

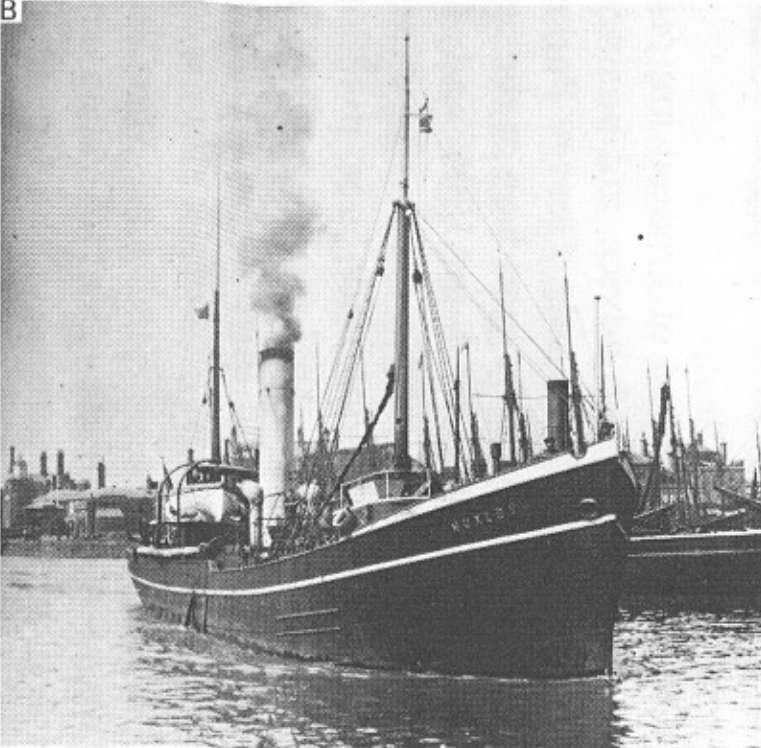
- Huxley shown in 1905, departing Lowestoft on an international cruise.

History

United Kingdom
- Name: Khedive
- Owner: J Meadows Ltd, Grimsby
- Builder: Smith’s Dock Co Ltd., North Shields
- Yard number: 622
- Laid down: 1899
- Launched: 16/11/1899
- In service: 1899
- Home port: Grimsby
- Fate: Sold in 1902

History
- Name: RV Huxley
- Namesake: Thomas Henry Huxley
- Owner: 1902 George P Bidder, Grimsby - renamed HUXLEY; 1907 The Marine Biological Association of the United Kingdom, Plymouth; 1910 Walter Crampin, Grimsby; 1912 The Bunch Steam Fishing Co, Grimsby; 1919 William Baynton, Scartho, Grimsby; 1920 Headway Steam Fishing Co Ltd, Grimsby; 1923 William J Allen, Grimsby; 1926 Harold A Jeffries, Grimsby; 1934 Line Fishing Co Ltd, Grimsby
- Commissioned: 1902
- Decommissioned: 1935
- Out of service: 1935
- Home port: Grimsby
- Fate: Broken up 1935
- Notes: 1899: Allocated fishing registration number GY1128 at Grimsby by 1905: Re-allocated fishing registration number GY536

General characteristics
- Tonnage: 191 long tons (194 t)/>
- Length: 115.7 ft (35.3 m)
- Beam: 21.1 ft (6.4 m)
- Draught: 11.2 ft (3.4 m)
- Propulsion: T3cyl (12.25, 19.5 & 32 x 22.5ins), 52nhp steam engine, GT Grey, South Shields

RV Huxley was the first research vessel used by the Marine Biological Association of the United Kingdom explicitly for fisheries research and is regarded as the first vessel yielding data for the Ministry of Agriculture, Fisheries and Food (United Kingdom) - Directorate of Fisheries, now known as the Centre for Environment, Fisheries and Aquaculture Science (Cefas) .

== History ==
Huxley was built by Smiths Dock Company, North Shields in 1899, and purchased by George Parker Bidder III. The vessel was leased to the MBA by Bidder, who used the profits to fund the Ray Lankester Investigatorship at the MBA. Huxley was originally a commercial steam trawler named Khedive, but was renamed Huxley in honour of Thomas Henry Huxley in 1902 to assist the newly created fisheries laboratory in Lowestoft. Her fish-hold was gutted and turned into cabin accommodation for sea-going 'naturalists' and their assistants, and a laboratory was provided on deck, so setting the pattern for many subsequent fishery research vessels.

Huxley was the first research vessel acquired by the MBA that was able to venture into open waters, and was thus used to survey the southern North Sea, the English Channel, and the area west of Plymouth. This was England's contribution to the International Council for the Exploration of the Sea (Scotland, the northern section, was treated differently).

== Service as a fishery research vessel ==
Fishery investigations began in September 1902 under the directorship of Walter Garstang. The work consisted of systematic exploration of the North Sea trawling grounds at different seasons of the year, together with studies of growth and migration of plaice Pleuronectes platessa based on tagging experiments, examination of the food of fish and the nature of the seabed. Detailed catch records from North Sea survey stations between 1902 and 1903 were summarised in a report published by Garstang in 1905. Research continued until 1909.

Data from these early surveys have now been digitized as part of the Trawling through Time initiative at Cefas. More than 150 hand-written ‘naturalists logbooks’ spanning 1902-1909 have been re-discovered in the Cefas archives.

Plaice and other fish were caught, labelled, and released, and when they were subsequently re-caught by trawlers, the location of recapture was marked. Within the first year, 1,463 plaice were marked in this fashion, 19% of which were recaptured - proving that a significant proportion of the North Sea fish stock was being caught by fishermen each season. It was also discovered that immature fish did not breed on the Dogger Bank, and there was a suggestion that moving immature fish from inshore areas to the bank would result in more catches the next season for English fishing vessels.

== Service from 1910 onwards ==
In January 1910, on instruction from the Chancellor of the Exchequer, HM Treasury passed responsibility for North Sea fishery investigations to the Board of Agriculture and Fisheries (later MAFF), who in-turn were required to come to an agreement with the Marine Biological Association (MBA) as to how scientific investigations could continue into the future, in support of the International Council for the Exploration of the Sea (ICES). On 1 April 1910 staff at the fisheries laboratory in Lowestoft moved to 43 Parliament Street, London, becoming civil servants. The Association closed the Lowestoft fisheries laboratory and sold the RV Huxley to W. Crampin for £2,400. Consequently, from then onwards the now London-based staff were forced to make their research voyages aboard chartered commercial vessels.

In June 1915, Huxley was requisitioned by the Royal Navy along with hundreds of other trawlers, and armed with a single 6-pounder AA gun. Her main role was to look for submarines, similar to an Admiralty trawler, but built to different specifications.

Following the war, Huxley was sold to a succession of different fishing boat owners in Grimsby. In an account of "Wrecks of the Pentland Firth" it is suggested that in 1926 Huxley, a Grimsby trawler outward bound, went ashore at Duncansby Head. She was refloated by Stroma fishermen but was so badly holed that she had to be run ashore west of the Ness. She was again refloated by Stroma fishermen and towed to Longhope by the salvage vessel Iron Axe, piloted by the Stroma men.

The steam trawler Huxley was finally broken up in 1935.
