= RV Corella =

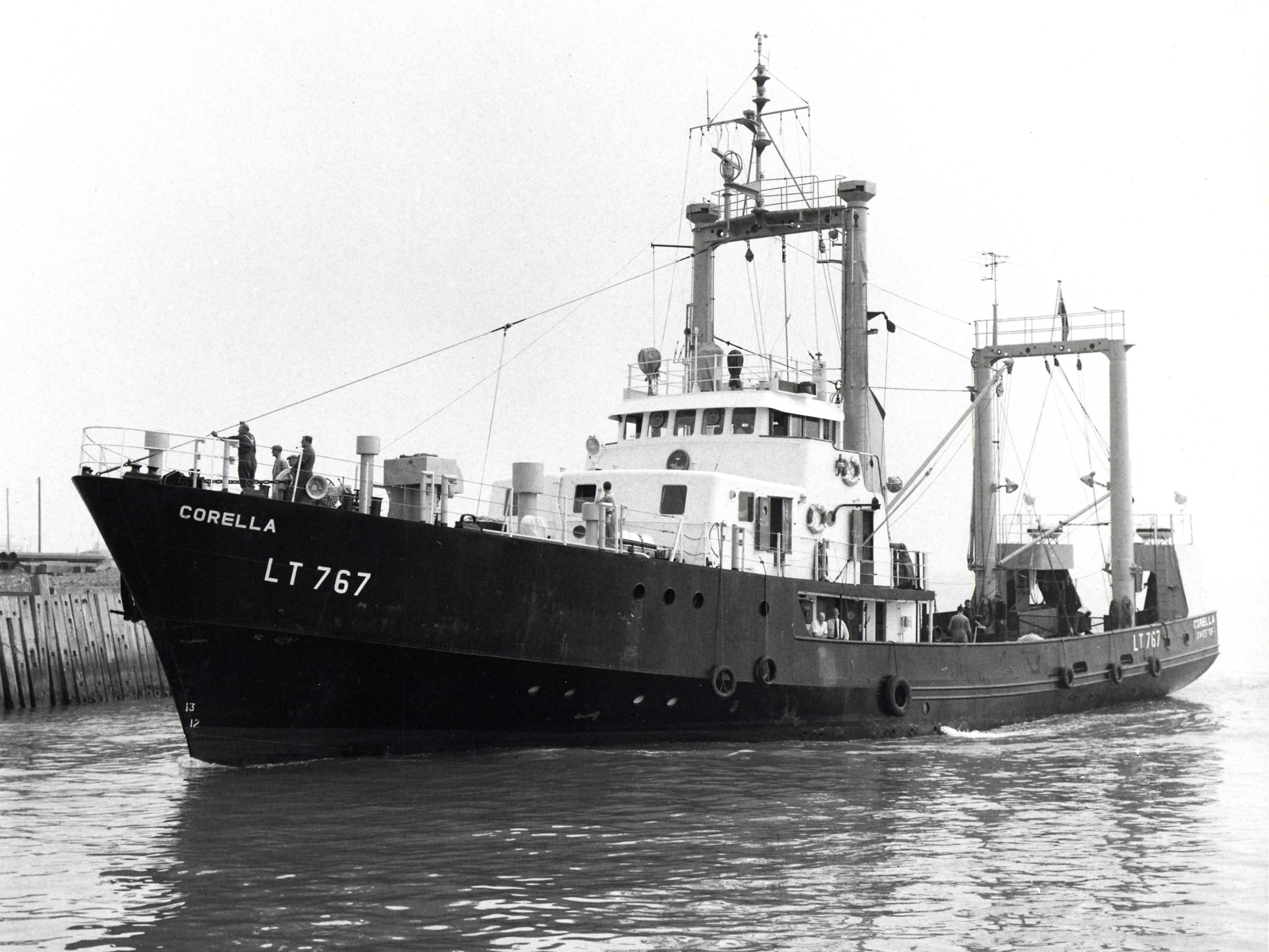
- RV Corella

History

United Kingdom
- Name: RV Corella (LT767); MV Dawn Sky; MV Putford Sky
- Owner: Ministry of Agriculture, Fisheries and Food (United Kingdom); Warbler Shipping; Putford Enterprises; Seacor Holdings
- Builder: Brooke Marine (Lowestoft)
- Yard number: 1482
- Laid down: 1964
- Launched: 1967
- Commissioned: 20 April 1967
- Decommissioned: April 2012
- In service: 1967-1983
- Out of service: 15 December 1982
- Renamed: January 1983
- Home port: Lowestoft
- Identification: IMO number: 6607393; Call Sign: GWMA
- Fate: Scrapped, Grenaa - Denmark, April 2012

General characteristics
- Type: Research Vessel; Offshore supply vessel
- Displacement: 459 t (452 long tons)
- Length: 41.38 m (135 ft 9 in)
- Beam: 9.75 m (32 ft 0 in)
- Draught: 4.13 m (13 ft 7 in)
- Propulsion: 2 x MAKE: Allen BHP: 520 each
- Speed: 10.5 knots (12.1 mph; 19.4 km/h)
- Complement: Up to 16 crew

RV Corella (LT767) was a fisheries research vessel that was operated by the Ministry of Agriculture, Fisheries and Food (United Kingdom) - Directorate of Fisheries, now known as the Centre for Environment, Fisheries and Aquaculture Science (Cefas) between 1967 and 1983.

She was constructed by Brooke Marine in Lowestoft, and subsequently operated out of the port of Lowestoft.

In 1983 the RV Corella was sold to Warbler Shipping and renamed MV Dawn Sky. In 1985 she was converted into an offshore supply vessel and one of her two distinctive A-frame winches was removed. Between 1986 and 1988 the Dawn Sky was re-chartered for government fisheries survey work, both by the Department of Agriculture and Fisheries (Scotland) and the Ministry of Agriculture, Fisheries and Food (United Kingdom).

Warbler Shipping was bought by Putford Enterprises (of Great Yarmouth) in 1994, subsequently part of the American supply ship operators Seacor Holdings. The MV Dawn Sky was renamed MV Putford Sky and was used by BP on the Amethyst gas field off Yorkshire. She was sold to Fornæs Shipbreaking for scrapping in Denmark, leaving Great Yarmouth 6 April 2012 on her final voyage to Grenaa, 45 years after she had been constructed.

== Construction ==
The RV Corella was constructed by Brooke Marine having been commissioned by the Ministry of Agriculture, Fisheries and Food (United Kingdom) to replace its earlier (1946–1967) research vessel the RV Platessa. The RV Platessa had primarily been used to survey herring, plaice and other inshore fish resources in the southern North Sea, English Channel and Irish Sea.

Brooke Marine (also known as J.W. Brooke & Co. and Brooke Yachts) was a Lowestoft-based shipbuilding firm. The company constructed boats and small ships for civilian and commercial use, as well as minor warships for the Royal Navy. The company was founded in 1874 and operated until 1992.

Construction started at Brooke Marine in 1964, and it was hoped that the RV Corella (named after the sea-squirt Corella parallelogramma) would come into service in early 1965, but in reality that did not happen until April 1967.

The RV Corella is regarded as the first ‘modern’ research vessel owned and operated by the Directorate of Fisheries. Her deck, laboratory equipment and electric power supplies were more sophisticated in comparison with her predecessors such as the contemporaneous RV Clione. She had advanced noise suppression systems in her engine room to allow acoustic surveying of fish populations.

Sea trials took place from 17 to 21 March 1967 and highlighted initial deficiencies with regard to winches and their hydraulic drive system, that would require time to be remedied. The maiden voyage of the RV Corella began on 20 April 1967 (until 25 March), with the aim to determine the best methods of handling each type of trawl, to make a first assessment of trawling performance and to learn how to operate a purse-seine from this ship, off the Farne Deeps, and Flamborough Head in the North Sea.

A 20 ft ‘bos boat’ (skiff) was purchased from Norway and named the Caranx, that could either be carried by the RV Corella for use in purse seining or be used for longshore work. The RV Corella was subsequently found to be unsuitable for purse seine operations and such little use was made of the Caranx that it was eventually sold.

== Service as a fisheries research vessel ==
The RV Corella (LT767) was in service with Directorate of Fisheries from 20 April 1967 until 15 December 1982, during which time she participated in 266 separate research campaigns.

Throughout her working life the RV Corella was engaged in acoustic surveys of fish populations. Notably, in June 1967, the Lowestoft Fisheries Laboratory cooperated with the Admiralty Research Laboratory to identify fish detected by long-range sonar equipment installed at the Admiralty Experimental Station, Perranporth. The RV Corella was directed from the shore to an area some 65 km distant, that was returning a strong and extended echo. The Corella was able to correlate this target with shoals detected on a conventional echo sounder, and substantial catches of sprats were taken in the area using a midwater trawl.

The RV Corella was used throughout the 1970s for pioneering studies on fish migration. Individual plaice (Pleuronectes platessa) fitted with 300 kHz acoustic transponding tags were tracked by sector scanning sonar off the East Anglian coast for periods up to 54 hours and over distances up to 61 km. The semidiurnal (12 h period) vertical movements were clearly related to the tidal cycle, ascents being more closely linked to slack water than descents. The regular pattern of behaviour – called selective tidal stream transport – was shown to provide a quick and economical means of movement for fish on migration through areas with strong tides.

On 7 January 1984, the Lowestoft Journal featured a story titled "crew members shocked as redundancies announced and the fisheries vessel `Corella` laid up and perhaps sold off".

In 1985 she was sold to Warbler Shipping and converted into an offshore supply vessel. In June 1986 as the MV Dawn Sky she was chartered by the Scottish Association for Marine Science – Dunstaffnage laboratory, to deploy current meters in the Irish Sea, as well as to engage in water sampling and phytoplankton distribution mapping. In November 1986 she was re-hired by the Ministry of Agriculture, Fisheries and Food (United Kingdom) (MAFF) - Burnham Laboratory for sediment and fish sampling off the Humber and in the North Sea.

In 1987 the MV Dawn Sky was hired by MAFF to deploy current meter moorings in the Eastern Irish Sea, to lay sea bed Drifters east of the Isle of Wight, and by the Department of Agriculture and Fisheries (Scotland) - to undertake a routine demersal trawling survey on Rockall Bank.

In March 1988 the MV Dawn Sky was hired by MAFF for a final time, to collect surface seawater samples at stations around the west and North of Scotland, as well as near bottom samples for radiocaesium analysis.

== See also ==
- Centre for Environment, Fisheries and Aquaculture Science
- Mincarlo (trawler)
- Brooke Marine
