= RV Ernest Holt =

Former fisheries research vessel that was operated by the Ministry of Agriculture

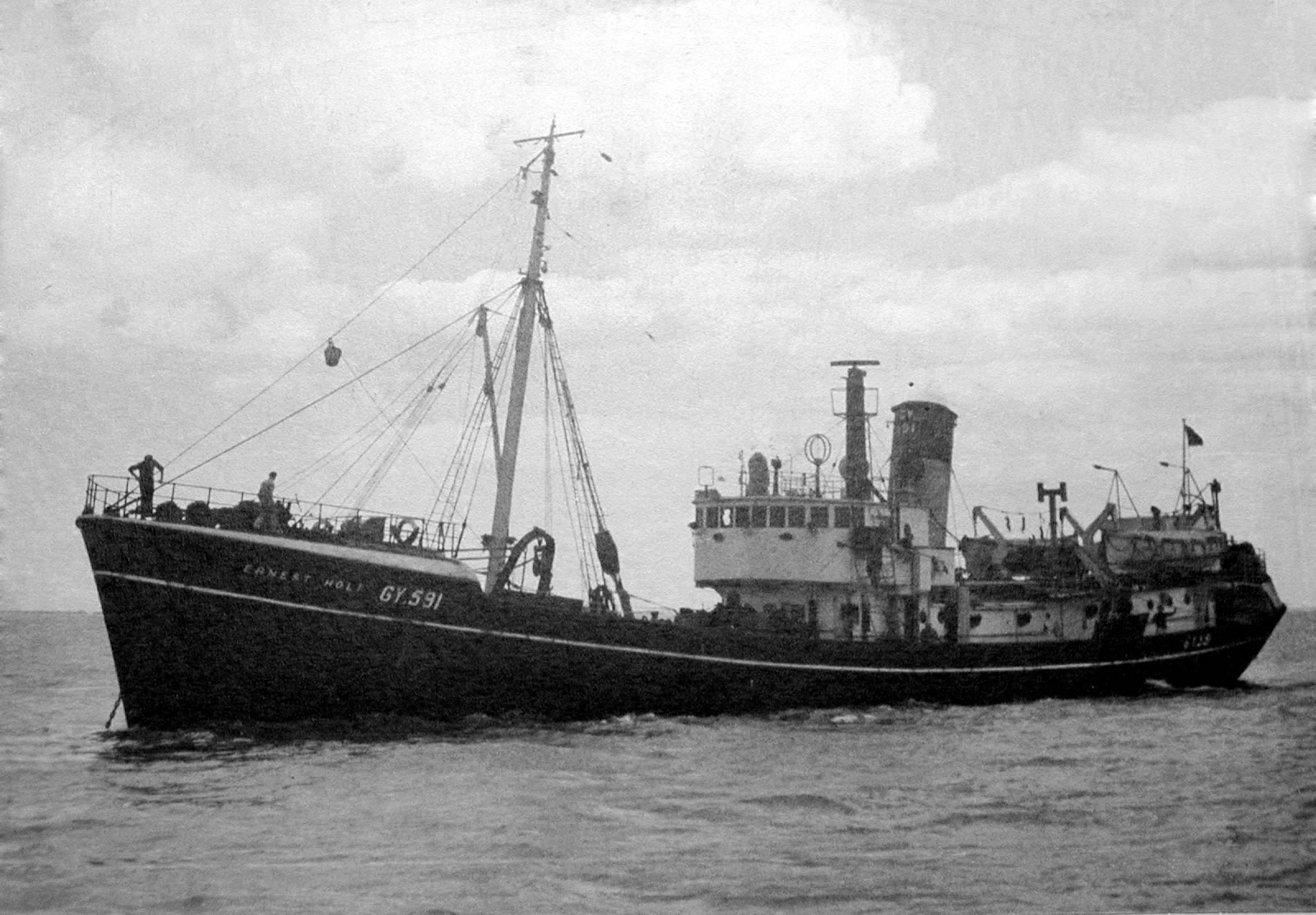
- RV Ernest Holt during the 1950s

History

United Kingdom
- Name: RV Ernest Holt (GY591)
- Operator: Ministry of Agriculture, Fisheries and Food (United Kingdom); Scottish Fisheries Protection Agency
- Ordered: 1946
- Builder: Cochrane & Sons, Selby, Yorkshire
- Launched: 9 June 1948
- Commissioned: 4 January 1949
- Decommissioned: 1971 renamed Switha
- Homeport: Grimsby
- Identification: IMO number: 5105817
- Fate: Wrecked on 31 January 1980 off Inchkeith Island

General characteristics
- Class & type: Research vessel
- Tonnage: 573 tons
- Displacement: 440 long tons (447 t)
- Length: 175 ft (53.3 m)
- Beam: 30 ft 6 in (9.3 m)
- Draught: 17.5 ft 9 in (5.6 m)
- Propulsion: Scotch-type boiler, triple expansion engine developed 900 B.H.P
- Speed: 11 knots
- Complement: 26 crew, 5 researchers

RV Ernest Holt (GY591) was a fisheries research vessel that was operated by the Ministry of Agriculture, Fisheries and Food (United Kingdom) - Directorate of Fisheries, now known as the Centre for Environment, Fisheries and Aquaculture Science (Cefas).

Research aboard the RV Ernest Holt around Bear Island (Norway) in the Arctic established an important link between fishable cod concentrations and water temperatures.

In her later years she carried out some of the first exploratory voyages to the deep water grounds of the continental slope to the west of Britain.

Being too deep in draught for convenient operation from Lowestoft and being crewed and operated primarily for the arctic fisheries based on Humberside, RV Ernest Holt worked from Grimsby, although managed and directed from the Fisheries Laboratory Lowestoft.

In 1971 she was renamed "SWITHA" and became a Scottish Fisheries Protection Agency vessel. She was wrecked on 31 January 1980 off Inchkeith Island in the Firth of Forth and subsequently blown up as a hazard to shipping.

== Construction ==
During 1946, the vessel was designed by Mr V Gray of Cochrane & Sons, Selby. The commercial trawler "St. Bartholomew" (later Stella Arcturus) had been proven to behave well in bad weather on her maiden commercial voyage and hence RV Ernest Holt was built along similar lines.

The new ship was launched at Selby (Yorkshire) on 9 June 1948, by Mrs A.T.A Dobson, wife of the then Fisheries Secretary. In naming RV Ernest Holt it was thought fitting to commemorate the pioneer naturalist of North Sea fisheries investigations Ernest William Lyons Holt, whose work at Grimsby in the 1890s had provided the foundation of fisheries science.

The first Master of the RV Ernest Holt was Captain W.R. Ingham, with a crew complement of 26. The planned complement of research staff was two naturalists and two technicians, but it was found necessary to modify this to three naturalists and one or two technicians.

Trials were carried out in the Humber in December 1948 and the ship sailed from Grimsby on her maiden voyage on 4 January 1949.

== Service as a fisheries research vessel ==
Fisheries survey logbooks from RV Ernest Holt research campaigns in the 1950s have now been fully digitized by scientists at the Centre for Environment, Fisheries and Aquaculture Science, revealing how cod in the Barents Sea and around Bear Island (Norway) responded to changing seawater temperatures during the 20th century.

Datasets collected aboard the RV Ernest Holt were instrumental in the ground-breaking book On the Dynamics of Exploited Fish Populations written by Ray Beverton and Sidney Holt in 1957.

== See also ==
- Centre for Environment, Fisheries and Aquaculture Science
- Bear Island (Norway)
- Ernest William Lyons Holt
