= German submarine U-245 =

German World War II submarine

Coordinates: 55°25′N 6°19′W

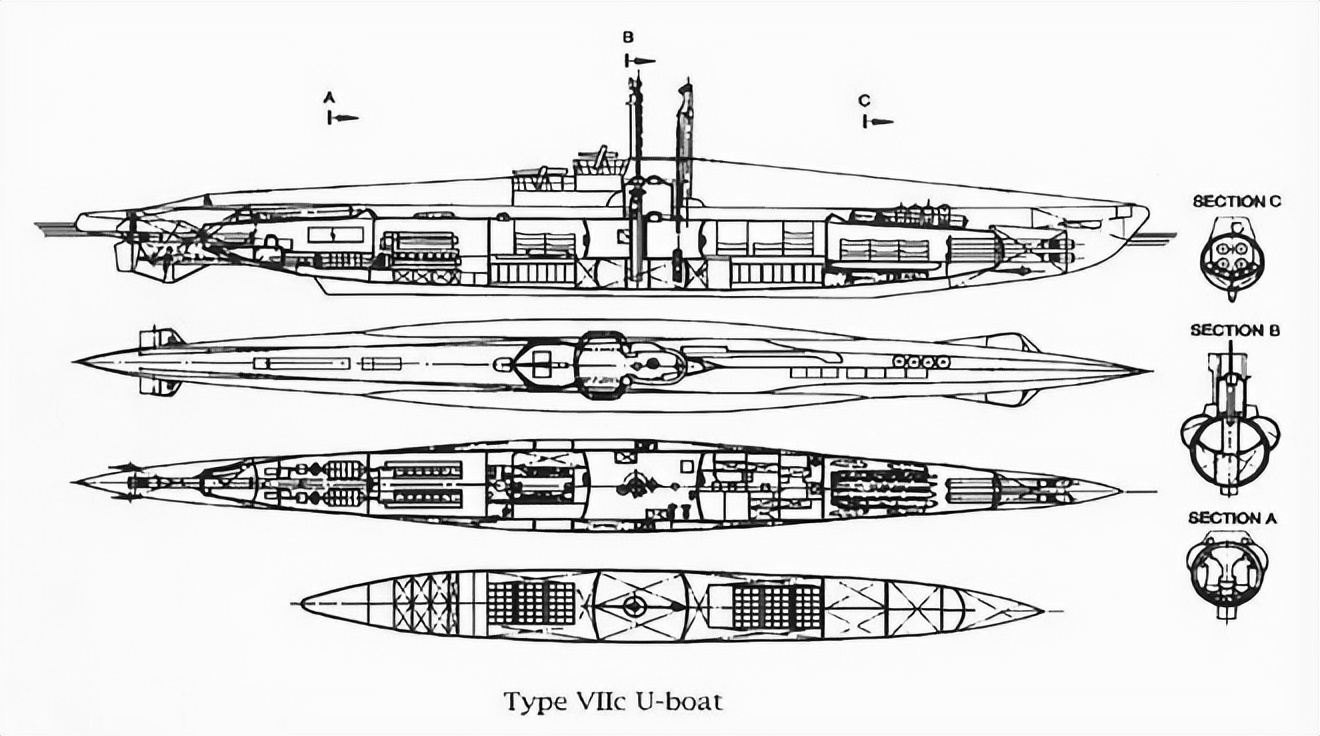
- A cross-section of a Type VIIC U-boat.

History

Nazi Germany
- Name: U-245
- Ordered: 10 April 1941
- Builder: Germaniawerft, Kiel
- Yard number: 679
- Laid down: 18 November 1942
- Launched: 25 November 1943
- Commissioned: 18 December 1943
- Fate: Surrendered on 9 May 1945; Scuttled on 7 December 1945 during Operation Deadlight

General characteristics
- Class & type: Type VIIC submarine
- Displacement: 769 tonnes (757 long tons) surfaced; 871 t (857 long tons) submerged
- Length: 67.23 m (220 ft 7 in) o/a; 50.50 m (165 ft 8 in) pressure hull
- Beam: 6.20 m (20 ft 4 in) o/a; 4.70 m (15 ft 5 in) pressure hull
- Height: 9.60 m (31 ft 6 in)
- Draught: 4.74 m (15 ft 7 in)
- Installed power: 2,800–3,200 PS (2,100–2,400 kW; 2,800–3,200 bhp) (diesels); 750 PS (550 kW; 740 shp) (electric)
- Propulsion: 2 shafts; 2 × diesel engines; 2 × electric motors
- Speed: 17.7 knots (32.8 km/h; 20.4 mph) surfaced; 7.6 knots (14.1 km/h; 8.7 mph) submerged
- Range: 8,500 nmi (15,700 km; 9,800 mi) at 10 knots (19 km/h; 12 mph) surfaced; 80 nmi (150 km; 92 mi) at 4 knots (7.4 km/h; 4.6 mph) submerged
- Test depth: 230 m (750 ft); Crush depth: 250–295 m (820–968 ft)
- Complement: 4 officers, 40–56 enlisted
- Armament: 5 × 53.3 cm (21 in) torpedo tubes (four bow, one stern); 14 × torpedoes or 26 TMA mines; 1 × 8.8 cm (3.46 in) deck gun(220 rounds); 1 × 3.7 cm (1.5 in) Flak M42 AA gun; 2 × twin 2 cm (0.79 in) C/30 anti-aircraft guns

Service record
- Part of: 5th U-boat Flotilla; 18 December 1943 – 31 July 1944; 3rd U-boat Flotilla; 1 August – 1 October 1944; 33rd U-boat Flotilla; 1 October 1944 – 8 May 1945
- Identification codes: M 52 094
- Commanders: Kptlt. / K.Kapt. Friederich Schumann-Hindenberg; 18 December 1943 – 9 May 1945
- Operations: 3 patrols: 1st patrol: a. 14 August – 28 October 1944; b. 3 – 6 January 1945; 2nd patrol: a. 14 January – 18 February 1945; b. 6 – 7 April 1945; 3rd patrol: 9 April – 9 May 1945
- Victories: 3 merchant ships sunk (17,087 GRT)

German submarine U-245 was a Type VIIC U-boat of Nazi Germany's Kriegsmarine during World War II. The submarine was laid down on 18 November 1942 at the Friedrich Krupp Germaniawerft yard at Kiel as yard number 679, launched on 25 November 1943 and commissioned on 18 December under the command of Korvettenkapitän Friederich Schumann-Hindenberg.

In three patrols, she sank three ships of 17,087 GRT.

She surrendered to the Allies on 9 May 1945.

== Design ==
German Type VIIC submarines were preceded by the shorter Type VIIB submarines. U-245 had a displacement of 769 tonnes (757 long tons) when at the surface and 871 tonnes (857 long tons) while submerged. She had a total length of 67.10 m (220 ft 2 in), a pressure hull length of 50.50 m (165 ft 8 in), a beam of 6.20 m (20 ft 4 in), a height of 9.60 m (31 ft 6 in), and a draught of 4.74 m (15 ft 7 in). The submarine was powered by two Germaniawerft F46 four-stroke, six-cylinder supercharged diesel engines producing a total of 2,800 to 3,200 metric horsepower (2,060 to 2,350 kW; 2,760 to 3,160 shp) for use while surfaced, two AEG GU 460/8–27 double-acting electric motors producing a total of 750 metric horsepower (550 kW; 740 shp) for use while submerged. She had two shafts and two 1.23 m (4 ft) propellers. The boat was capable of operating at depths of up to 230 metres (750 ft).

The submarine had a maximum surface speed of 17.7 knots (32.8 km/h; 20.4 mph) and a maximum submerged speed of 7.6 knots (14.1 km/h; 8.7 mph). When submerged, the boat could operate for 80 nautical miles (150 km; 92 mi) at 4 knots (7.4 km/h; 4.6 mph); when surfaced, she could travel 8,500 nautical miles (15,700 km; 9,800 mi) at 10 knots (19 km/h; 12 mph). U-245 was fitted with five 53.3 cm (21 in) torpedo tubes (four fitted at the bow and one at the stern), fourteen torpedoes, one 8.8 cm (3.46 in) SK C/35 naval gun, (220 rounds), one 3.7 cm (1.5 in) Flak M42 and two twin 2 cm (0.79 in) C/30 anti-aircraft guns. The boat had a crew complement of between forty-four and sixty.

== Service history ==
After training with the 5th U-boat Flotilla at Kiel, U-245 was transferred to the 3rd flotilla for front-line service on 1 August 1944. She was reassigned to the 33rd flotilla on 1 October.

=== First patrol ===
The boat's first patrol was preceded by a short trip between Kiel and Horten Naval Base in Norway. Her first sortie began with her departure from Horten on 14 August 1944. She passed into the Atlantic Ocean via the gap between Iceland and the Faroe Islands. The boat was attacked by a Catalina flying boat on 30 September. No casualties or damage was sustained.

=== Second patrol ===
U-245 sank Henry B. Plant about 17 nmi (31 km; 20 mi) east of Ramsgate on 5 February 1945.

=== Third patrol ===
She also sank Filleigh and Karmt, both on 18 April and both about 10 nmi (19 km; 12 mi) east southeast of North Foreland in Kent.

The boat surrendered at Bergen on 9 May 1945 and was transferred to Loch Ryan for scuttling in Operation Deadlight. She was scuttled on 7 December 1945.

== Summary of raiding history ==
Date	Ship Name	Nationality	Displacement	Fate
5 February 1945	Henry B. Plant	United States	7,240	Sunk
18 April 1945	Filleigh	United Kingdom	4,856	Sunk
18 April 1945	Karmt	Norway	4,991	Sunk

== Bibliography ==
- Busch, Rainer; Röll, Hans-Joachim (1999). German U-boat commanders of World War II : a biographical dictionary. Translated by Brooks, Geoffrey. London, Annapolis, Md: Greenhill Books, Naval Institute Press. ISBN 1-55750-186-6.
- Busch, Rainer; Röll, Hans-Joachim (1999). Deutsche U-Boot-Verluste von September 1939 bis Mai 1945 [German U-boat losses from September 1939 to May 1945]. Der U-Boot-Krieg (in German). Vol. IV. Hamburg, Berlin, Bonn: Mittler. ISBN 3-8132-0514-2.
- Gröner, Erich; Jung, Dieter; Maass, Martin (1991). U-boats and Mine Warfare Vessels. German Warships 1815–1945. Vol. 2. Translated by Thomas, Keith; Magowan, Rachel. London: Conway Maritime Press. ISBN 0-85177-593-4.
