= ICES Journal of Marine Science =

Peer-reviewed scientific journal covering oceanography and marine biology

- Discipline: Oceanography
- Language: English, French
- Edited by: Howard I. Browman

Publication details
- Former name(s): Journal du Conseil
- History: 1926–present
- Publisher: Oxford University Press
- Frequency: 8/year
- Impact factor: 3.593 (2020)

Standard abbreviations
- ISO 4: ICES J. Mar. Sci.

Indexing
- CODEN: ICESEC
- ISSN: 1054-3139 (print); 1095-9289 (web)
- OCLC no.: 153969554

Links
- Journal homepage; Online archive

The ICES Journal of Marine Science is a peer-reviewed scientific journal covering oceanography and marine biology. It is published by Oxford University Press on behalf of the International Council for the Exploration of the Sea, of which it is the official journal. It was established in 1926 as the Journal du Conseil, obtaining its current name in 1991. The editor-in-chief is Howard I. Browman (Austevoll Research Station). According to the Journal Citation Reports, the journal has a 2020 impact factor of 3.593.
