= Carrasco (surname) =

Carrasco is a Spanish, Portuguese and Galician surname. It derives from a Spanish word meaning ‘holm oak’ (originally from the Latin cerrus, from a pre-Roman Celtiberian word). Notable people with the surname include:

- Ada Carrasco (1912–1994), Mexican actress
- Angela Carrasco (born 1954), Dominican singer
- Baldemar Carrasco (1931–2025), Chilean politician
- Berna Carrasco Araya (1914–2013), Chilean chess master
- Carlos Carrasco (actor) (born 1948), Panamanian-American actor
- Carlos Carrasco (baseball) (born 1987) American baseball player
- D. J. Carrasco (born 1977), American baseball player
- David Carrasco (born 1949), American scholar of Mesoamerican religions
- Cyndi Carrasco, American politician
- Eduardo Carrasco (born 1940), Chilean musician and professor of philosophy
- Eduardo Carrasco (footballer) (born 1972), Swiss footballer
- Eduardo Carrasco Toro (born 1779), Peruvian academic
- Erik Carrasco (born 1983), Chilean basketball player
- Ezequiel Carrasco (born 2002), Canadian soccer player
- Felix Carrasco (born 1955), Mexican-Austrian conductor
- Francisco Antonio García Carrasco Díaz (1742–1813), Spanish soldier and Royal Governor of Chile
- Francisco José Carrasco (born 1959), Spanish footballer
- Héctor Carrasco (born 1969), American baseball player
- Hernán Carrasco Vivanco (1923–2023), Chilean football manager
- Isabel Carrasco (1955–2014), Spanish politician
- Isaías Carrasco (1964–2008), Spanish Basque politician murdered by ETA
- Joe Carrasco, Tex-Mex "new wave" musician
- Jorge Carrasco (born 1982), Chilean footballer
- José Carrasco (disambiguation) (multiple people)
- Juan Carrasco (disambiguation) (multiple people)
- Kini Carrasco (born 1965), Spanish parathlete and politician
- Luis Carrasco (skeleton) (born 1963), Mexican skeleton racer
- Manuel Carrasco (born 1981), Spanish singer
- María Carrasco (born 1995), Spanish singer
- Maruja Carrasco (1944–2018), Spanish botanist
- Máximo Carrasco (died in 1990), Peruvian footballer and manager
- Nancy Carrasco, Mexican physician and molecular biochemist
- Nicolás Rodríguez Carrasco (1890–1940), Mexican politician and general
- Omar Carrasco (1974–1994), Argentine murder victim
- Óscar Carrasco (Chilean footballer) (1927–1998), Chilean football midfielder
- Óscar Carrasco (Spanish footballer) (born 2002), Spanish football midfielder
- Pancha Carrasco (1816–1890), Costa Rican medic and national heroine
- Pedro Carrasco (1943–2001), Spanish professional boxer
- Priscilla Carrasco (born 1983), American photographer
- Raimon Carrasco (1924–2022), Spanish Catalan businessman, former president of FC Barcelona
- Ricardo Carrasco (born 1965), Chilean photographer
- Rocío Carrasco (born 1977), Spanish television presenter and businesswoman
- Servando Carrasco (born 1988), American soccer player
- Tino Carrasco (Born 1976), Swedish entrepreneur and model
- Yannick Carrasco (born 1993), Belgian footballer

Fictional characters:

- Dr. Sanson Carrasco, character in a play within Man of La Mancha
- Juan Carrasco, character in the 1964 film The Outrage
