= Criollo people =

Latin Americans of Spanish descent

Criollo
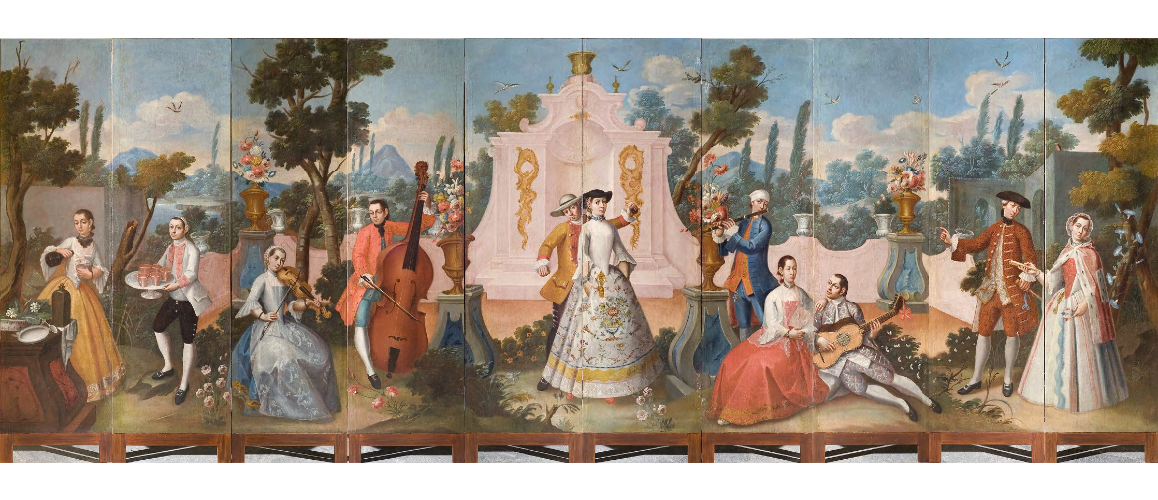
- A scene depicting many criollos at a soiree in the garden of Chapultepec, ca. 1780–1790, Museo Nacional de Historia, Chapultepec Castle, Mexico City.

Regions with significant populations
- Spanish colonial empire in the Americas

Languages
- Spanish

Religion
- Predominantly Roman Catholic

Related ethnic groups
- Spaniards, Hispanics, Mestizos

In Hispanic America, criollo (Spanish pronunciation: [ˈkɾjoʎo]) is a term used originally to describe people of full and near complete Spanish descent born in the New World viceroyalties, under the Spanish crown. In different Hispanic American countries, the word has come to have different meanings, mostly referring to the local-born majority. Beginning in the 16th century, especially in Mexico and Peru, they were a social class near the top of the casta hierarchy of the overseas realms, but below peninsular European-born Spaniards, for whom the top administrative, clerical and political positions were reserved. They were locally born people — almost always of Spanish ancestry, but also sometimes of other European ethnic backgrounds.

Their identity was strengthened as a result of the Bourbon reforms of 1700, which changed the Spanish Empire's policies toward its colonies and led to tensions between criollos and peninsulares. The growth of local criollo political and economic strength in the separate colonies, coupled with their global geographic distribution, led them to each evolve separate (both from each other and Spain) organic national identities and viewpoints. During the Spanish American Wars of Independence, criollos like Miguel Hidalgo y Costilla, Simón Bolívar and José de San Martín became the main supporters of independence from Spanish rule in their respective countries.

In contemporary colloquial speech in many regions, the word has come to be variously used as an adjective or an informal demonym, mostly referring to what's "local", "folksy", autochthonous to the region or very typical of a particular Latin American country, as in- cocina criolla (local cuisine), música criolla (local music), viveza criolla, criollada.

== Origin ==
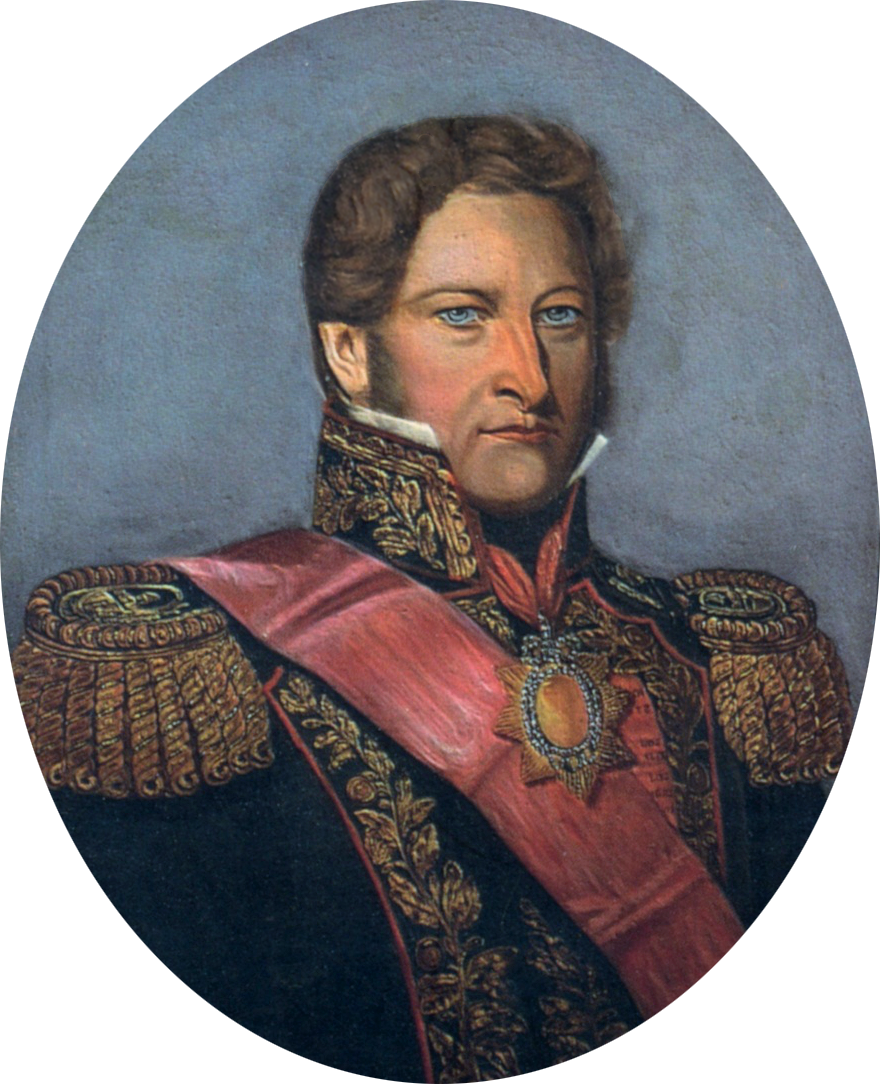
Argentine caudillo Juan Manuel de Rosas, an example of a criollo of full-Spanish descent

The word criollo and its Portuguese cognate crioulo are believed by some scholars, including the eminent Mexican anthropologist Gonzalo Aguirre Beltrán, to derive from the Spanish/Portuguese verb criar, meaning 'to breed' or 'to raise'; however, no evidence supports this derivation in early Spanish literature discussing the origin of the word. In Spanish colonies, an español criollo was an ethnic Spaniard who had been born in the colonies, as opposed to an español peninsular born in Spain. Crioulo as a Portuguese term, however, differs in that it refers to Brazilians of African ancestry.

Spaniards born in the Spanish East Indies were called insulares. Whites born in colonial Brazil, with both parents born in the Iberian Peninsula, were known as mazombos.

=== Colonial society ===
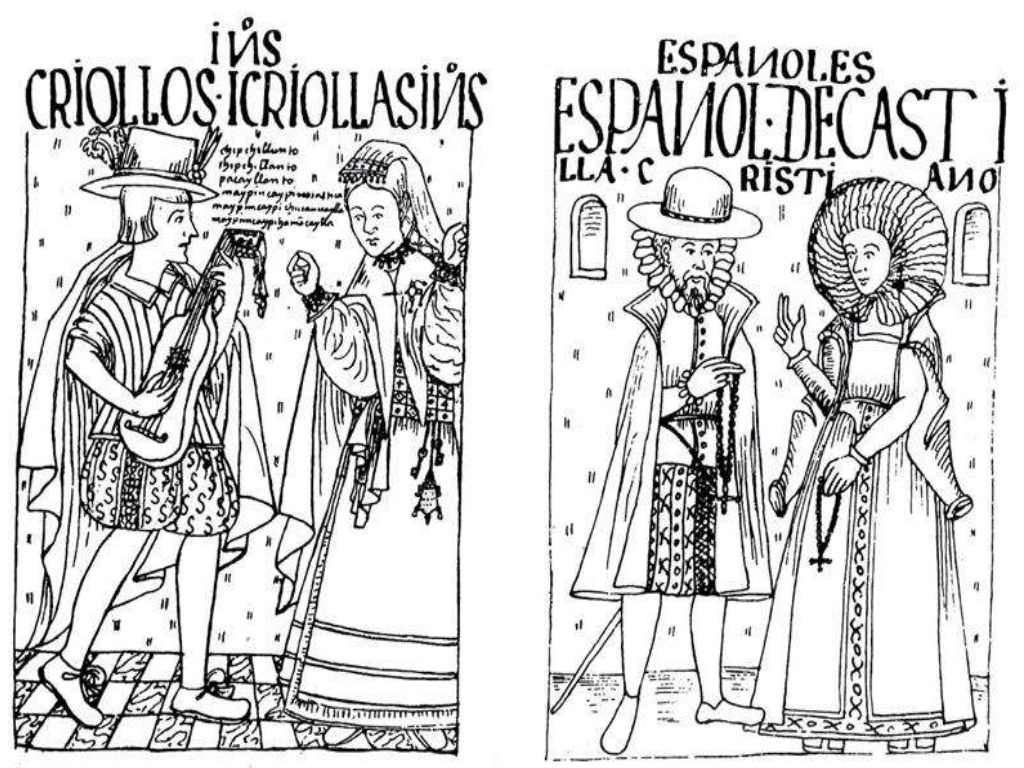
The Spanish and their descendants born in America formed the highest social group in the colony. Drawing from the New Chronicle and Good Government by Felipe Guamán Poma de Ayala, 16th century.

In the 19th and 20th centuries millions of European and European-derived populations from North and South America did immigrate to the region. According to church and censal registers for Acatzingo in 1792, during colonial times, 73% of Spanish men married with Spanish women. Ideological narratives have often portrayed criollos as a "pure Spanish" people, mostly men, who were all part of a small powerful elite. However, Spaniards were often the most numerous ethnic group in the colonial cities, and there were menial workers and people in poverty who were of Spanish origin throughout all of Latin America.

== Culture ==
The criollos allowed a syncretism in their culture and gastronomy, and they, in general, felt more identified with the territory where they were born than with the Iberian peninsula. Evidence is their authorship of works demonstrating an attachment to and pride in the natives and their history. They sometimes criticized the crimes of the conquistadores, often denouncing and defending natives from abuse. In the colony's last two centuries criollos rebelled in response to the harsh suppression of Indigenous uprisings. They allowed the natives and the mestizos (indigenous/European mixed) to be schooled in the universities and art schools, and many natives and mestizos were notable painters and architects, mostly in the Andes, but also in Mexico.

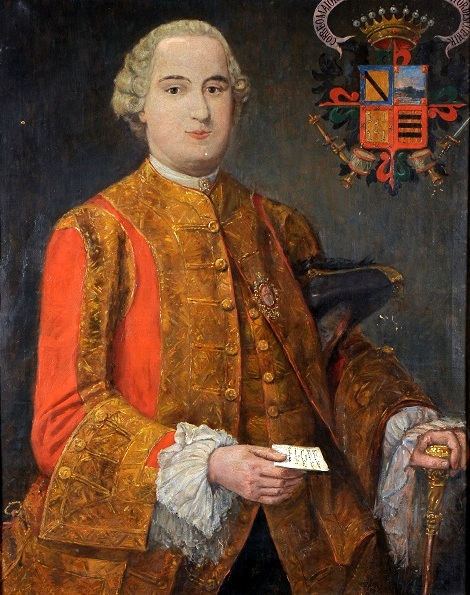
Fermín Francisco de Carvajal Vargas, Duke of San Pedro. Creole born in the Kingdom of Chile

The mixed religious or secular music appears since the 16th century in Spanish and indigenous languages. Baroque music is imported from Spain but with European and African instruments (such as drums and congas) appears. The Spanish also introduce a wider musical scale than the indigenous pentatonic, and a melodic and poetic repertoire, transmitted by writings such as songbooks, common of it is the sung voice, common in the European baroque music, the mixed aesthetics are the fruit of diverse contributions indigenous, African and especially, Spanish and European. Instruments introduced by the Spanish are the chirimías, sackbuts, dulcians, orlos, bugles, violas, guitars, violins, harps, organs, etc., along with percussions (that can be indigenous or African), everything converges on music heard by everyone. The Dominican Diego Durán in 1570 writes, "All the peoples have parties, and therefore it is unthinkable to remove them (because it is impossible and because it is not convenient either)", himself parade like the natives with a bouquet of flowers at a Christian party that coincides with the celebration of Tezcatlipoca in Mexico. The Jesuits develop with great success a "pedagogy of theatricality", with this the Society of Jesus attracts the natives and blacks to the church, where children learn to play European instruments. In Quito (1609): "there were many dances of tall and small Indigenous, and there was no lack of Moscas Indigenous who danced in the manner of the New Kingdom [European] (...) and dances of Spaniards and blacks and other dances of the Indigenous must dance before the Blessed Sacrament and in front of the Virgin Mary and the saints at parties and Easter, if they don't do it then they are punished". The well-known Zambra mora was commonly danced by blacks, to the sound of castanets and drums. The Spanish Sarabande was danced by whites and blacks. Blacks also have their chiefs. In these local events, the brotherhoods of the Congos give rise to the Congadas (Brazil, Caribbean).

Actually, there were no relevant black artists during the colony; also, one must consider the fact that many of the pure blacks were slaves, but the Law of Coartación or "slave law" was created since the 16th century, reaching its maximum peak in the 18th century, which made the black slaves to buy their freedom, through periodic payments to their owner, which eventually led to freedom. Others were freed and purchased by family members or allied whites. It was a consuetudinary act in Spanish America; it allowed the appearance of a large population of free blacks in all of the territory. Freedom could also be obtained through baptism, with the white recognizing his illegitimate children; his word was sufficient for the newborn child to be declared free. Legal freedom was more common in the cities and towns than in the countryside. From the late 16th to early 19th centuries, the Spanish encouraged fugitive slaves from the Thirteen Colonies and United States to come to Spanish Florida as refuge; Charles II of Spain and his court issued a royal decree in 1690 freeing all slaves who fled to Florida and converted to Catholicism; most went to the area around St. Augustine, but escaped slaves also reached Pensacola and Cuba. Also, a substantial number of blacks from the French colony of Saint-Domingue arrived as refugees to Spanish Louisiana because of these greater freedoms. The Spanish Santa Teresa de Mose (Florida) became the first legally sanctioned free black town in the present-day United States. The popularity of the Law of coartación resulted in a large population of free black people in Spanish America.

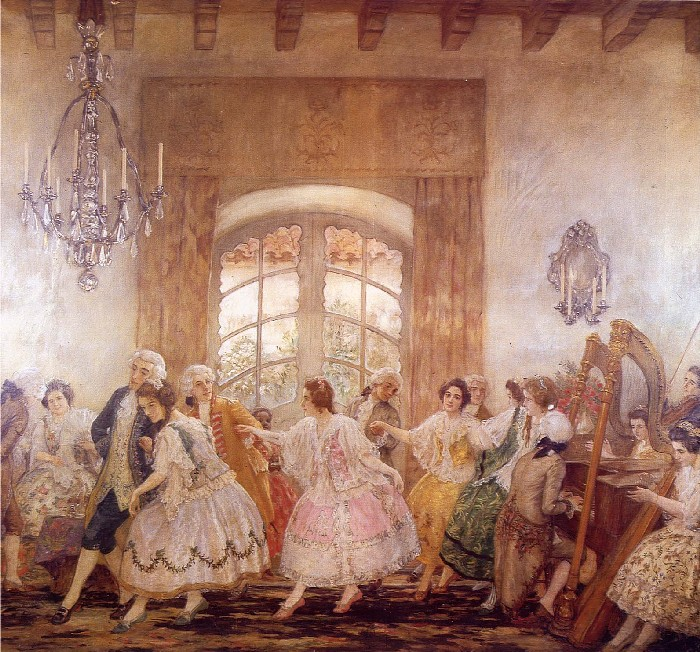
Criollos dancing at a ball in Colonial Chile

Also, Mexican historian Federico Navarrete comments: that "if they received the surname of the white father and incorporated them into their family, those children counted as American whites having the same rights, regardless of the race". Also, a fact is in every marriage, including the most mixed, they are characterized, portrayed and named the caste product that was according to their ancestry, and if this can not, according to their appearance and color.

Several documents mention that indigenous people called Criollos with the same name as one of their gods. For example, Juan Pablo Viscardo relates (1797) that the Indigenous (from Peru) call to the Criollos 'Viracocha'; also, he says that Criollos are born in the middle of the Indigenous, are respected, and also loved by many, that they speak the language of the natives (in addition to Spanish) and used to Indigenous customs.

After suppressing the Túpac Amaru II Uprising of 1780 in the viceroyalty of Peru, evidence began against the criollos ill will from the Spanish Crown, especially for the Oruro Rebellion prosecuted in Buenos Aires, and also for the lawsuit filed against Dr. Juan José Segovia, born in Tacna, and Colonel Ignacio Flores, born in Quito, who had served as President of the Real Audiencia of Charcas and had been Governor Mayor of La Plata (Chuquisaca or Charcas, current Sucre).

== In the wars of independence ==
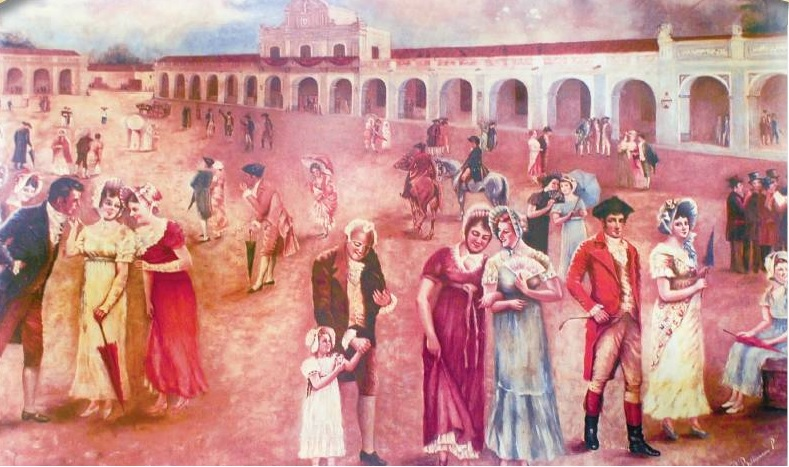
Criollos in what is now Guatemala rejoice upon learning about the declaration of independence from Spain on September 15, 1821.

Until 1760, the Spanish colonies were ruled under laws designed by the Spanish Habsburgs, which granted the American provinces broad autonomy. That situation changed by the Bourbon Reforms of 18th century during the reign of Charles III. Spain needed to extract increasing wealth from its colonies to support the European and global wars it needed to maintain the Spanish Empire. The Crown expanded the privileges of the peninsulares, who took over many administrative offices that had been filled by Criollos. At the same time, reforms by the Catholic Church reduced the roles and privileges of the lower ranks of the clergy, who were mostly Criollos. By the 19th century, this discriminatory policy of the Spanish Crown and the examples of the American and French revolutions, led Criollo factions to rebel against the peninsulares. With increasing support of the other castes, they engaged Spain in a fight for independence (1809–1826). The former Spanish Empire in the Americas separated into a number of independent republics.

== Modern colloquial uses ==
The word criollo retains its original meaning in most Spanish-speaking countries in the Americas. In some countries, however, the word criollo has over time come to have additional meanings, such as "local" or "home-grown". For instance, comida criolla in Latin American Spanish-speaking countries refers to "local cuisine", not "cuisine of the criollos". In Portuguese, crioulo is also a racist slang term referring to blacks.

In some countries, the term was extended or changed over the years:

- In Argentina, criollo is used for people whose ancestors were already present in the territory in the colonial period, regardless their race. The exception are the indigenous population (while non-indigenous amerindians usually also are referred as criollos).
- In Peru, criollo is associated with the syncretic culture of the Pacific Coast, a mixture of Spanish, African, Indigenous, and Gitano elements. Its meaning is, therefore, more similar to that of "Louisiana Creole people" than to the criollo of colonial times.
- In the U.S. territory of Puerto Rico, natives of the town of Caguas are usually referred to as criollos; professional sports teams from that town are also usually nicknamed Criollos de Caguas ("Caguas Creoles"). Caguas is located near Puerto Rico's Cordillera Central mountain area.

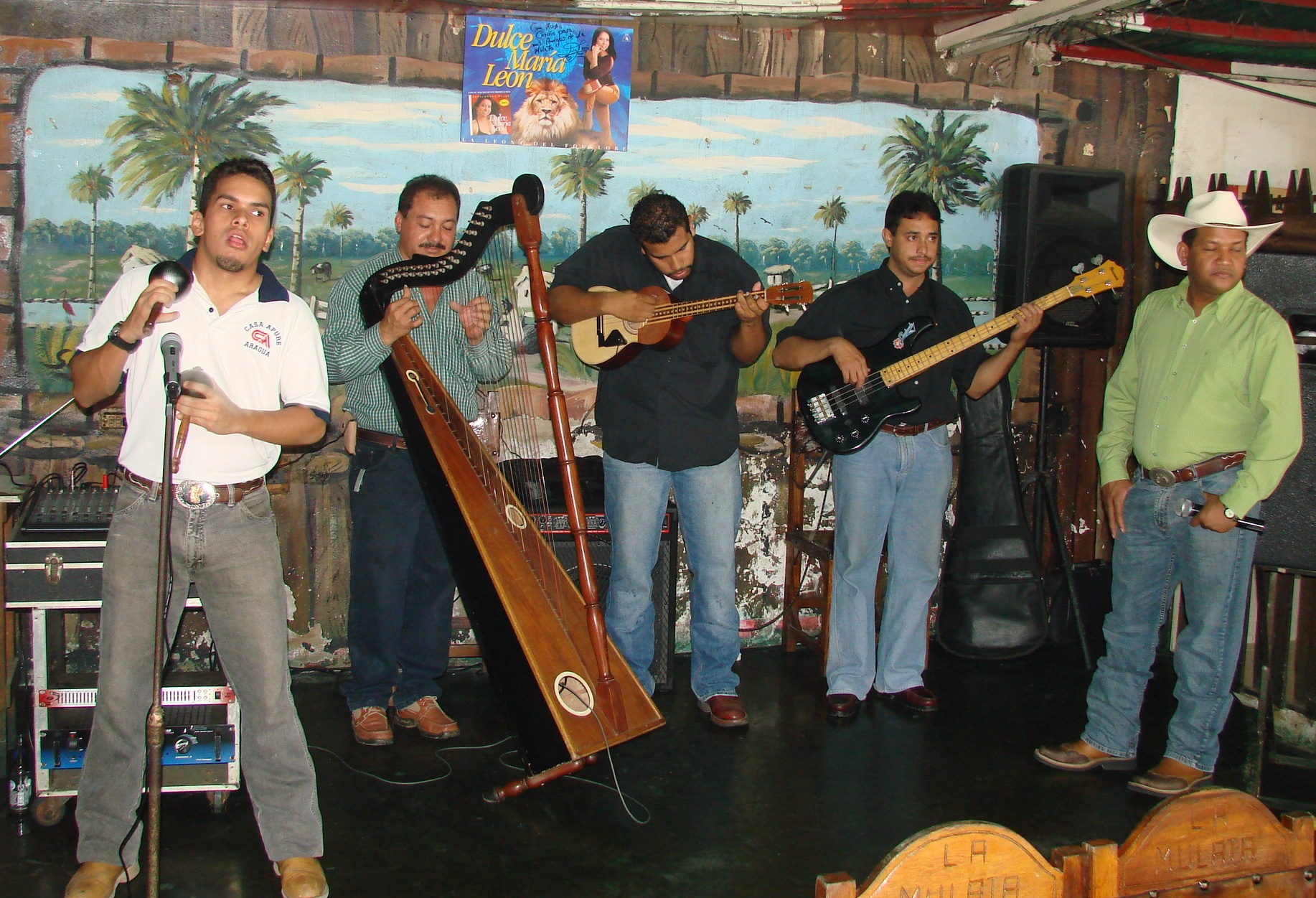
Image shows Venezuelan musicians performing Música llanera (música criolla).

- In Venezuela, criollo is associated with the national culture of Venezuela. Pabellón criollo is Venezuela's national dish, and the baseball Corporación Criollitos de Venezuela is a seeder to the well-renowned Venezuelan Professional Baseball League, among other examples. Música Criolla is a way to refer to Venezuelan traditional music i.e., joropo. Novelists like Rómulo Gallegos with his novel Doña Bárbara, Pedro Emilio Coll, and Luis Manuel Urbaneja Achelpohl with the novel Peonía were major exponents of the Criollismo movement. Criollo also often refers to a mongrel dog, or something traditional to the country or its citizens.
- In Cuba, Puerto Rico and Colombia, the word Criollo has similar meanings to those of Venezuela.

== In Mexico ==
=== Colonial period ===
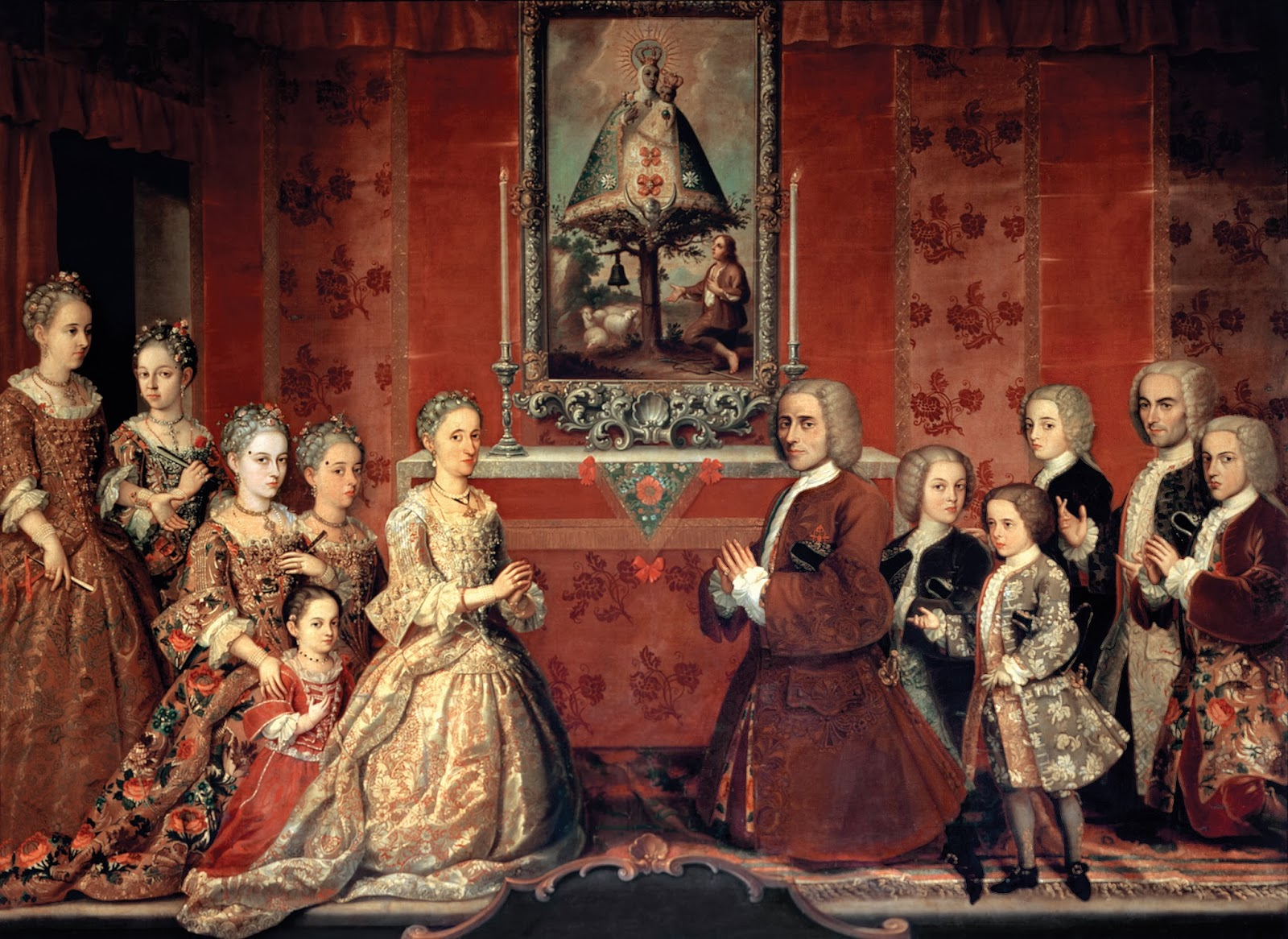
The Fagoaga Arozqueta family. A colonial Mexican criollo couple of Spanish [basque] ancestry with their ten children in Mexico City, New Spain, anonymous painter, ca. 1735. Museo Nacional de San Carlos of Mexico City.

As early as the sixteenth century in the colonial period in New Spain, criollos, or the "descendants of Spanish colonists," began to "distinguish themselves from the richer and more powerful peninsulares," whom they referred to as gachupines, as an insult. At the same time, Mexican-born Spaniards were referred to as criollos, initially as a term that was meant to insult. However, over time, "those insulted who were referred to as criollos began to reclaim the term as an identity for themselves. In 1563, the criollo sons of Spanish conquistador Hernán Cortés, attempted to remove Mexico from Spanish-born rule and place Martín, their half-brother, in power. However, their plot failed. They, along with many others involved, were beheaded by the Spanish monarchy, which suppressed expressions of open resentment from the criollos towards peninsulares for a short period. By 1623, criollos were involved in open demonstrations and riots in Mexico in defiance of their second-class status. In response, a visiting Spaniard by the name of Martín Carrillo noted, "the hatred of the mother country's domination is deeply rooted, especially among the criollos."

Despite being descendants of Spanish colonizers, many criollos in the period peculiarly "regarded the Aztecs as their ancestors and increasingly identified with the Indians out of a sense of shared suffering at the hands of the Spanish." Many felt that the story of the Virgin of Guadalupe, published by criollo priest Miguel Sánchez in Imagen de la Virgen María (Appearance of the Virgin Mary) in 1648, "meant that God had blessed both Mexico and particularly criollos, as "God's new chosen people." By the eighteenth century, although restricted from holding elite posts in the colonial government, the criollos notably formed the "wealthy and influential" class of major agriculturalists, "miners, businessmen, physicians, lawyers, university professors, clerics, and military officers." Because criollos were not perceived as equals by the Spanish peninsulares, "they felt they were unjustly treated and their relationship with their mother country was unstable and ambiguous: Spain was, and was not, their homeland," as noted by Mexican writer Octavio Paz.

They [criollos] felt the same ambiguity in regard to their native land. It was difficult to consider themselves compatriots of the Indians and impossible to share their pre-Hispanic past. Even so, the best among them, if rather hazily, admired the past, even idealized it. It seemed to them that the ghost of the Roman empire had at times been embodied in the Aztec empire. The criollo dream was the creation of a Mexican empire, and its archetypes were Rome and Tenochtitlán. The criollos were aware of the bizarre nature of their situation, but, as happens in such cases, they were unable to transcend it — they were enmeshed in nets of their own weaving. Their situation was cause for pride and for scorn, for celebration and humiliation. The criollos adored and abhorred themselves. [...] They saw themselves as extraordinary, unique beings and were unsure whether to rejoice or weep before that self-image. They were bewitched by their own uniqueness.

=== Independence movement ===
As early as 1799, open riots against the Spanish Crown's rule were unfolding in Mexico City, foreshadowing the emergence of a fully-fledged independence movement. At the conspiración de los machetes, soldiers and criollo traders attacked colonial properties "in the name of Mexico and the Virgen de Guadalupe." As news of Napoleon I's armies occupying Spain reached Mexico, Spanish-born peninsulares such as Gabriel de Yermo strongly opposed criollo proposals of governance, deposed the viceroy, and assumed power. However, even though Spaniards maintained power in Mexico City, revolts in the countryside were quickly spreading.

Ongoing resentment between criollos and peninsulares erupted after Napoleon I deposed Charles IV of Spain of power, which, "led a group of peninsulares to take charge in Mexico City and arrest several officials, including criollos." This, in turn, motivated criollo priest Miguel Hidalgo y Costilla to begin a campaign for Mexican independence from illegitimate Bonapartist “Spanish” rule. Launched in Hidalgo's home city of Dolores, Guanajuato, in 1810, Hidalgo's campaign gained support among many "Amerindians and Mestizos, but despite seizing a number of cities," his forces failed to capture Mexico City. In the summer of 1811, Hidalgo was captured by the Spanish and executed. Despite being led by a criollo, many criollos did not initially join the Mexican independence movement, and it was reported that "fewer than one hundred criollos fought with Hidalgo," despite their shared caste status. While many criollos in the period resented their "second-class status" compared to peninsulares, they were "afraid that the overthrow of the Spanish might mean sharing power with Amerindians and Mestizos, whom they considered to be their inferiors." Additionally, due to their privileged social class position, "many criollos had prospered under Spanish rule and did not want to threaten their livelihoods."

Criollos only undertook direct action in the Mexican independence movement when new Spanish colonial rulers threatened their property rights and church power, an act which was "deplored by most criollos" and therefore brought many of them into the Mexican independence movement. Mexico gained its independence from Spain in 1821 under the coalitionary leadership of conservatives, former royalists, and criollos, who detested Emperor Ferdinand VII's adoption of a liberal constitution that threatened their power. This coalition created the Plan de Iguala, which concentrated power in the hands of the criollo elite as well as the church under the authority of criollo Agustín de Iturbide who became Emperor Agustín I of the Mexican Empire. Iturbide was the son of a "wealthy Spanish landowner and a Mexican (criolla) mother" who ascended through the ranks of the Spanish colonial army to become a colonel. Iturbide reportedly fought against "all the major Mexican independence leaders since 1810, including Hidalgo, José María Morelos y Pavón, and Vicente Guerrero," and according to some historians, his "reasons for supporting independence had more to do with personal ambition than radical notions of equality and freedom."

=== Post-independence ===
Mexican independence from Spain in 1821 resulted in the beginning of criollo rule in Mexico as they became "firmly in control of the newly independent state." Although direct Spanish rule was now gone, "by and large, Mexicans of primarily European descent governed the nation." The period was also marked by the expulsion of the peninsulares from Mexico, of which a substantial source of "criollo pro-expulsionist sentiment was mercantile rivalry between Mexicans and Spaniards during a period of severe economic decline," internal political turmoil, and substantial loss of territory. Leadership "changed hands 48 times between 1825 and 1855" alone, "and the period witnessed both the Mexican-American War and the loss of Mexico's northern territories to the United States in the Treaty of Guadalupe Hidalgo and the Gadsden Purchase." Some credit the "criollos' inexperience in government" and leadership as a cause for this turmoil. It was only "under the rule of noncriollos such as the Indian Benito Juárez and the castizo Porfiro Díaz" that Mexico "experienced relative [periods of] calm."

By the late nineteenth and early twentieth centuries, the criollo identity "began to disappear," with the institution of mestizaje and Indigenismo policies by the national government, which stressed a uniform homogenization of the Mexican population under the Mestizo identity. As a result, "although some Mexicans are closer to the ethnicity of criollos than others" in contemporary Mexico, "the distinction is rarely made." During the Chicano movement, when leaders promoted the ideology of the "ancient homeland of Aztlán as a symbol of unity for Mexican Americans, leaders of the 1960s Chicano movement argued that virtually all modern Mexicans are Mestizos."

== In Central America ==
=== Colonial era ===
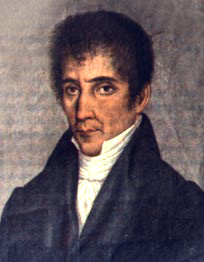
José Cecilio del Valle, born into a Criollo family from what is now southern Honduras in the city of Choluteca, he was a key figure of Central American independence and was a representative of Central America in Mexico City in 1822.

The first great wave of Spanish settlers to Central American lands occurred after the conquest of Tenochtitlan when they began to reach the soil of what is today Guatemala and the coasts of Honduras. Creoles in metropolitan America would quickly begin to take advantage of local mining, agricultural, and livestock production. The latter was very good in regions such as Honduras and Nicaragua. The towns where they settled enjoyed the construction of large colonial buildings that are heritage of many Central American nations today.

For the following centuries of Spanish domination, many Criollos in Central America owned large areas of land and agricultural businesses. There are several records of Spanish families in Central America with enormous fortunes who managed to obtain noble titles from the crown. Cities like Santiago de los Caballeros and Comayagua were political centers where many of them had properties and some of their economic activities were concentrated.

Unlike other peoples of the Spanish caste system of Central America they had greater access to higher education. Many of them could receive a formal education, both in local schools and in universities in the colonial metropolis, Spain, or in other parts of America. This allowed them to have knowledge in law, administration and philosophy. In the Catholic church, many Criollos functioned as general officials of the church in America, such as bishops.

Although many Central Americans who were part of the elite or were respected landowners used to be Criollos, there were also those who were poor, since they were children of those Spaniards who migrated as laborers for construction of churches and palaces in the Captaincy General of Guatemala. It is also known that not all descendants of Spaniards in Central America had access to land, education or wealth.

In some cases, Criollo families who were unable to prosper in the colonial economy or who lost their property due to debt or conflict found themselves in situations of poverty. Conversely, a Spanish immigrant and his descendants had certain advantages in climbing the social ladder since their purity of blood meant that they had greater opportunities to prosper, compared to many mestizos, indigenous people, and people of African descent.

=== Independence movement ===
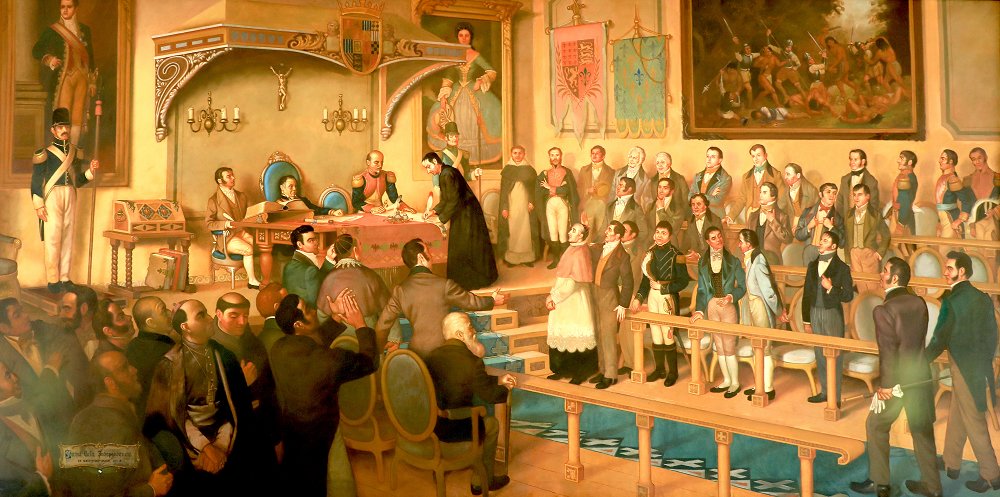
Signing of the declaration of Independence of Central America in 1821.

Although they enjoyed a privileged economic situation, they faced limitations in accessing the high administrative positions that the Spanish empire reserved for the peninsular Spaniards. This, along with the independence of the United States and the French Revolution that had already occurred, is what motivated the independence movement among the Criollo elite in the Captaincy General of Guatemala. This would be consolidated by 1821, although later the conservative elites would vote for Central America to form part of the new Mexican empire. This union would be ephemeral however, and by 1823 Central America was an independent republic. At first it would be a conservative federal republic, although the liberal faction would come to take power under the command of General Francisco Morazan, who was a supporter of the liberal institution that challenged several aspects of the Central American status quo, which in the following years led to a civil war. The Federal Republic of Central America would eventually fall in 1841 due to internal disputes like these.

=== Post Independence ===
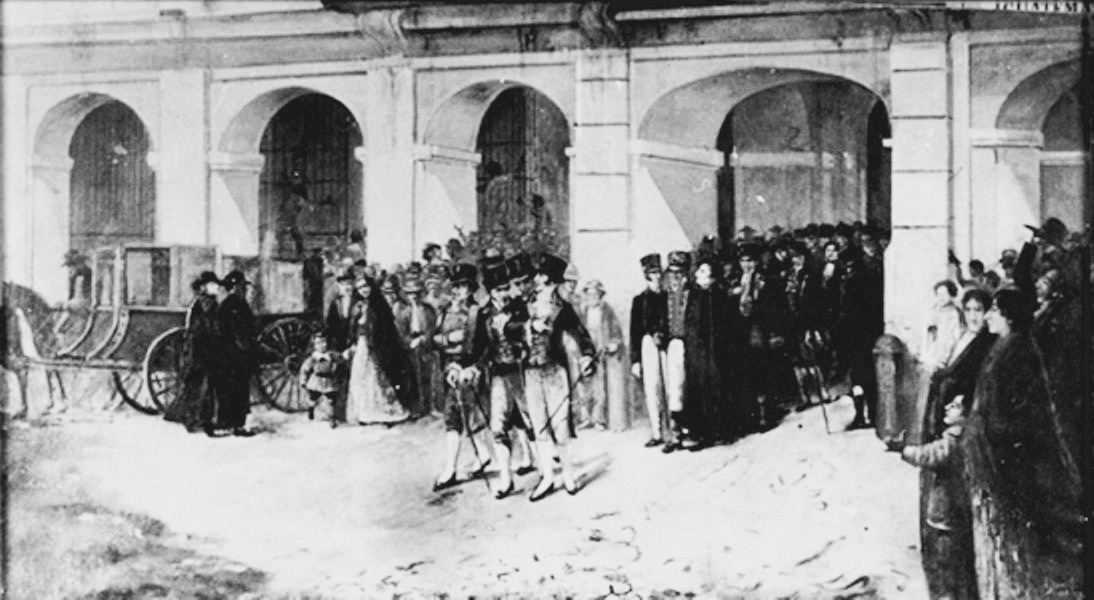
Criollos leaving the Royal Palace after the independence of the province of Guatemala.

In the middle of the 19th century the term "Criollos" would begin to disappear, this thanks to the fact that after the fall of the federation these republics would little by little begin to stop cataloging people by their origin or racial mix, thus the term Criollo would become only "White" although the term white in Central American countries can be broad since it includes populations that in other contexts are not classified as such. Nonetheless, there is an ethnic minority descended from the Spanish in these countries today.

== In the United States ==
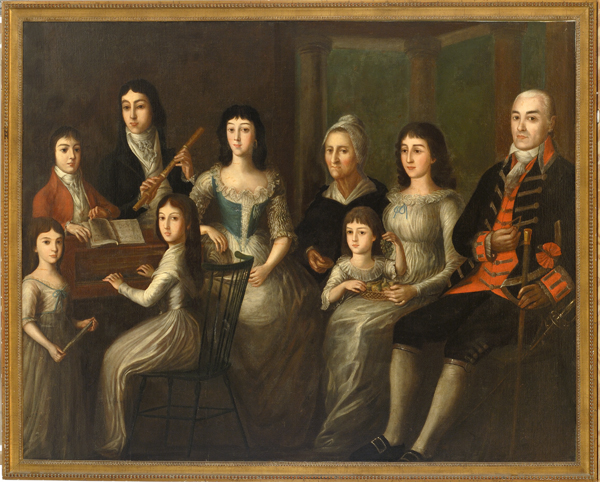
A Spanish Creole family portrait in New Orleans, Spanish Louisiana, 1790, painted by José Francisco de Salazar.

As the United States expanded westward, it annexed lands with a long-established population of Spanish-speaking settlers. This group became known as Hispanos. Prior to incorporation into the United States (and briefly, into Independent Texas), Hispanos had enjoyed a privileged status in the society of New Spain, and later in post-colonial Mexico.

Regional subgroups of Hispanos were named for their geographic location in the so-called "internal provinces" of New Spain:

- Californios in Las Californias ("The Californias"), and later Alta California ("Upper California")
- Nuevomexicanos in Spanish New Mexico, and later Mexican New Mexico (Nuevo México)
- Tejanos in Spanish Texas, and later Mexican Texas (Tejas)
- Luisianos in Spanish Louisiana, including the Adaeseños, descendants of Texas Creoles and Tlaxcalan Nahuatl settlers in Los Adaes, Louisiana. Another group of Hispanos, the Isleños ("Islanders"), are named after their geographic origin in the Old World, namely the Canary Islands. In the US today, this group is primarily associated with the state of Louisiana.
- Floridanos in Spanish Florida

== See also ==
- Academia Antártica
- Caguas, Puerto Rico - the "Criollo City"
- Conquistador
- Creole cuisine
- Creole peoples
- Criollismo
- Currency lads and lasses
- Encomienda (1492–1542)
- European emigration
- Hispanic
- List of Latin Americans of Spanish descent
- List of Criollos
- Mantuanos
- Vecino (historical use)
- Viceroyalty of Peru
- White Hispanic and Latino Americans
- White Latin Americans
- White Angolans
- White Brazilians

== Bibliography ==
- Will Fowler. Latin America, 1800–2000: Modern History for Modern Languages. Oxford University Press, 2000. ISBN 978-0-340-76351-3
- Carrera, Magali Marie (2003). Imagining Identity in New Spain: Race, Lineage, and the Colonial Body in Portraiture and Casta Paintings. Joe R. and Teresa Lozano Long Series in Latin American and Latino Art and Culture. Austin: University of Texas. ISBN 978-0-292-71245-4.
