= BAP Carrasco =

Peruvian research vessel

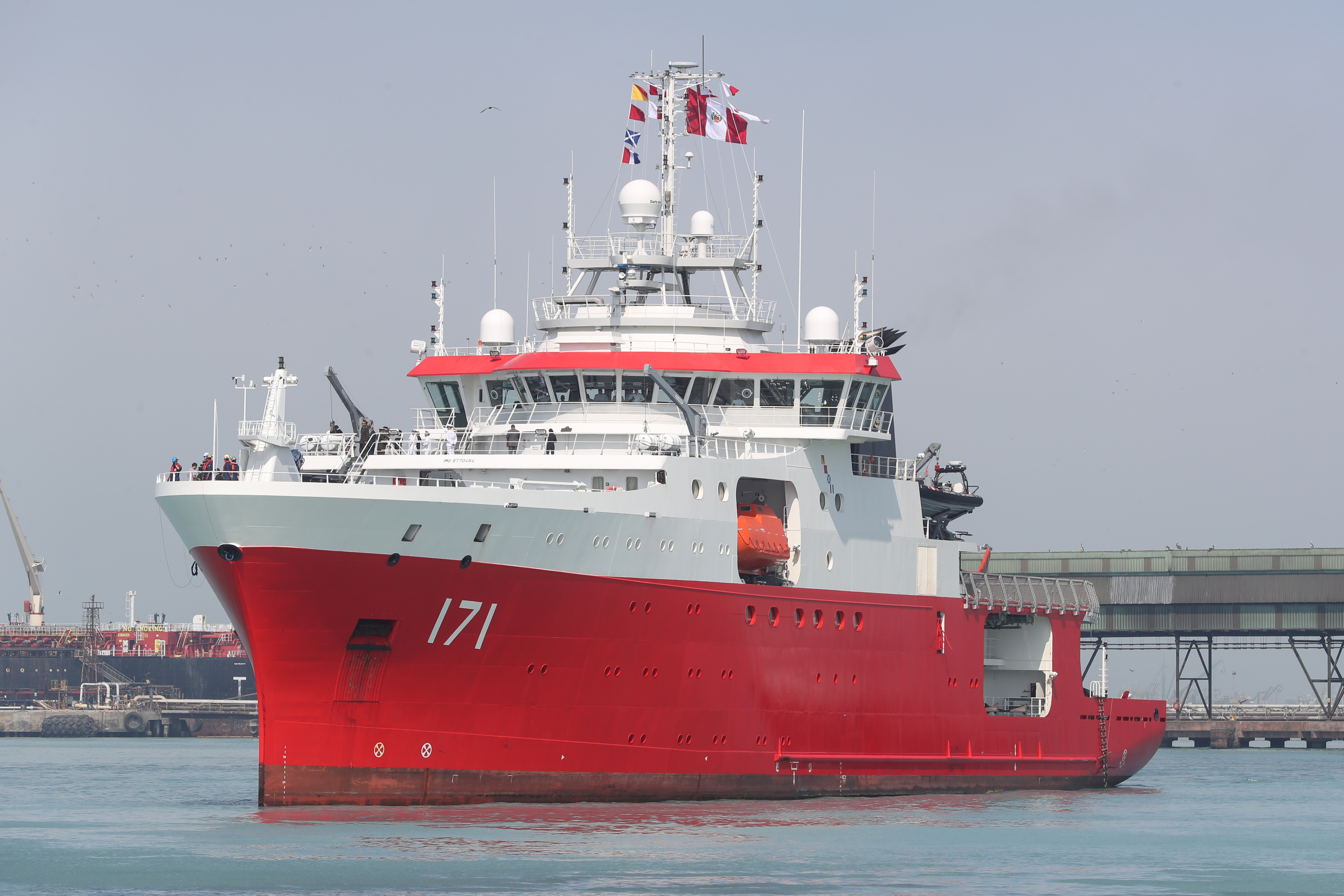
- BAP Carrasco (BOP-171)

History

Peru
- Name: Carrasco
- Namesake: Eduardo Carrasco Toro
- Owner: Peruvian Navy
- Ordered: 12 December 2014
- Builder: C.N.P. Freire, S.A, Vigo, Spain
- Launched: 7 May 2016
- Commissioned: 22 March 2017
- Identification: IMO number: 9770464; MMSI number: 760139000; Callsign: OBMT
- Status: in active service

General characteristics
- Type: Research vessel
- Displacement: 5,000 t (4,900 long tons)
- Length: 95.3 m (312 ft 8 in)
- Beam: 18.0 m (59 ft 1 in)
- Draft: 5.95 m (19 ft 6 in)
- Propulsion: 2 azimuth propellers, 3,000 kW (4,000 hp)
- Speed: 16.5 knots (30.6 km/h; 19.0 mph)
- Complement: (50 crew + 60 scientists)
- Aviation facilities: Helicopter hangar

BAP Carrasco is an oceanographic research vessel of the Peruvian Navy built in 2016 by Freire Shipyard in Vigo (Spain). Its purpose is to perform oceanographic research cruises both in Peruvian waters and in Antarctica, in order to fulfill Peru's commitment under the Antarctic Treaty. The ship is endowed with technical capabilities for activities of hydrography, oceanography, marine meteorology, and marine geology. It also has polar capability and it is classified with PC7 notation. Since 2017 the ship has become the main platform for Peruvian annual expeditions to Antarctica.

== Characteristics ==
The BAP Carrasco is 95.3 metres (312 ft 8 in) long and displaces 5,000 tonnes (4,900 long tons), powered by Caterpillar/General Electric diesel electric engines. The vessel can stay at sea for up to 51 days to perform its research capabilities. It has been endowed with modern equipment to conduct hydrographic surveys between 10 and 11,000 m (33 and 36,089 ft) deep, such as hydrographic boats for shallow waters, echo sounder for biological studies, torpedo-shaped submarine vehicles AUVs Kongsberg and oceanographic rosettes for water sampling. It also has eight laboratories for hydrographic, biological, oceanography and marine geology research. The vessel is rated SILENT-A class, reducing the underwater noise and improving the quality of data collection. The vessel can also serve in logistical operations, with the capability to transport two 20-foot (6.1 m) (ft) cargo containers (ISO) and it has one helicopter carrier deck and a hangar for airborne operations.

According to its Polar Class 7 ice class notation, the ship is able to keep its presence in Antarctica for long periods, allowing Peruvian scientists to perform more significant and long lasting researches, as well as giving a better support to Peruvian Antarctic Machu Picchu Base.

== History ==
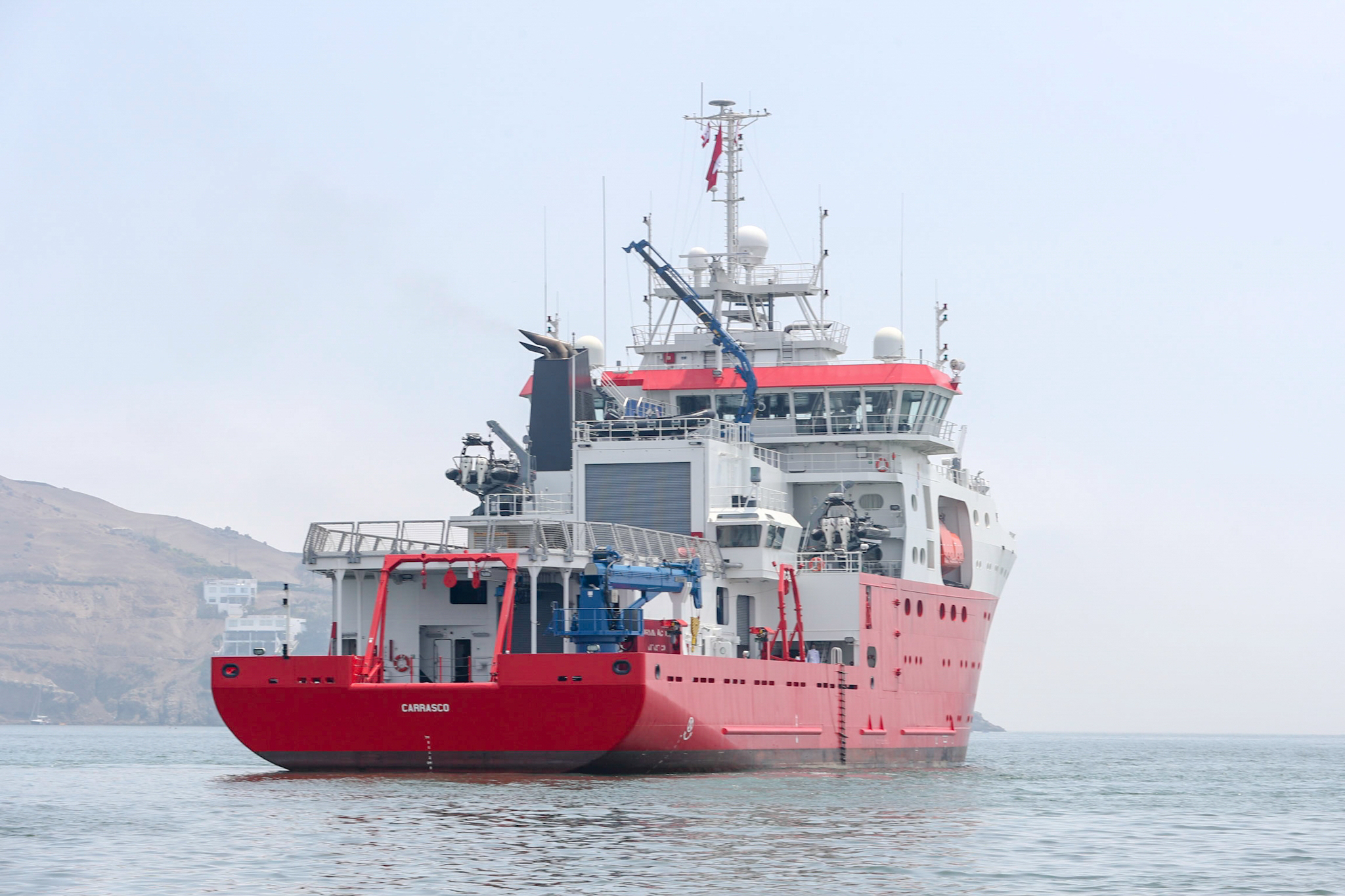
Reaching Callao base

=== Construction and commissioning ===
The acquisition of Carrasco was conceived by the Peruvian government to improve its research activities in Peruvian territorial waters and in Antarctica, where Peru operates the Machu Picchu Base. According to that, in 2014 the Peruvian Navy called for an international tender to award the construction of an oceanographic vessel with polar capabilities, emerging the Spaniard shipyard Freire as the winner. The contract was signed later on December 12, 2014.

On January 28, 2016, the ship was designated by Peruvian government as "BAP Carrasco (BOP-171)". It is named for Eduardo Carrasco Toro, Main Cosmographer of the Viceroyalty of Peru. On May 7, 2016, the vessel was launched in an official ceremony attended by Peruvian president Ollanta Humala, the Minister of Defense and the General Commander of the Navy.

The ship was delivered by the Freire shipyard to the Peruvian Navy on March 22, 2017, in Vigo (Spain). On the same day it was commissioned in an official flag raising ceremony held on its deck and attended by James Thornberry Schiantarelli, a high-ranked official of the Peruvian Navy, and Jose Antonio García Belaunde, Peruvian ambassador to Spain, among other authorities. The Carrasco succeeded the B.I.C. Humboldt in Peruvian expeditions to Antarctica.

On May 3, 2017, the Carrasco arrived to its base in Callao port and was assigned to serve on Hydrography and Navigation Agency of the Peruvian Navy in a ceremony attended by Peruvian president Pedro Pablo Kuczynski. It was first deployed on 27 June 2017, participating in a 21-day mission.

=== Service history ===
Fulfilling the commitments of Peruvian Antarctic Policy as a member of the Antarctic Treaty, the Carrasco supports Peru's Antarctic research activities that were previously carried out by the B.I.C. Humboldt since 1988, strengthening the Peruvian presence in that continent.

Accordingly, Peru performs annual expeditions to Antarctica (called ANTAR expeditions), sometimes in cooperation with other's countries researchers. On December 14, 2017, the Carrasco set sail into its first of this kind of mission, as part of the XXV ANTAR expedition which had a length of 90 days. During this trip the Carrasco crew performed scientific research, provided maintenance and supply to Peruvian Antarctic Machu Picchu Base and made protocolar visits to other Antarctic bases, returning to its home base in Peru on March 14, 2018. The next year the Carrasco took part in the XXVI ANTAR expedition from 7 December 2018 to 15 March 2019, in which Peruvian researchers performed several scientific programs out at Machu Picchu base and other at sea, covering areas such as glaciology, geology, atmospheric research, the study of El Niño Phenomenon, and climate change.

== Gallery ==
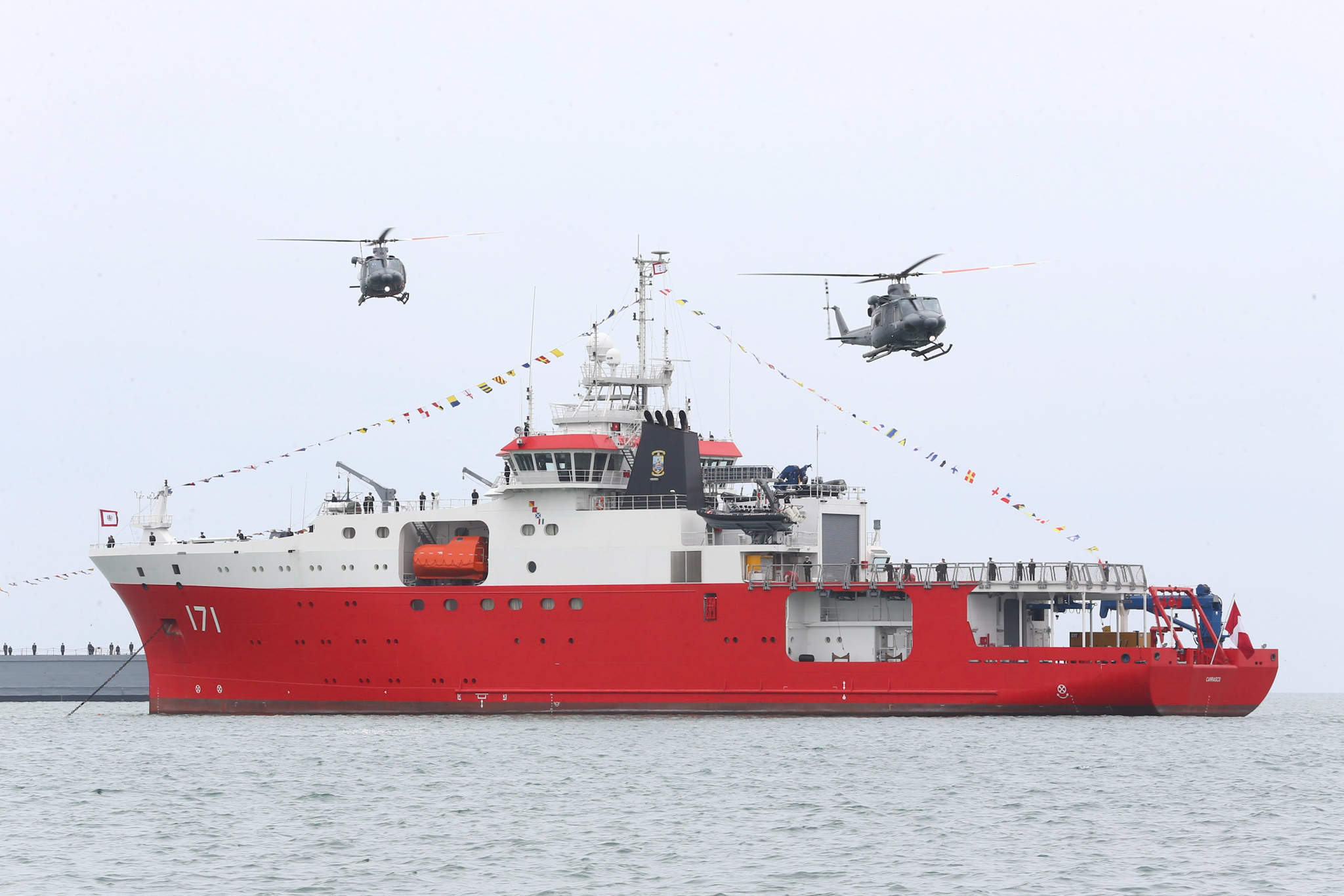
In Peruvian waters (2017)

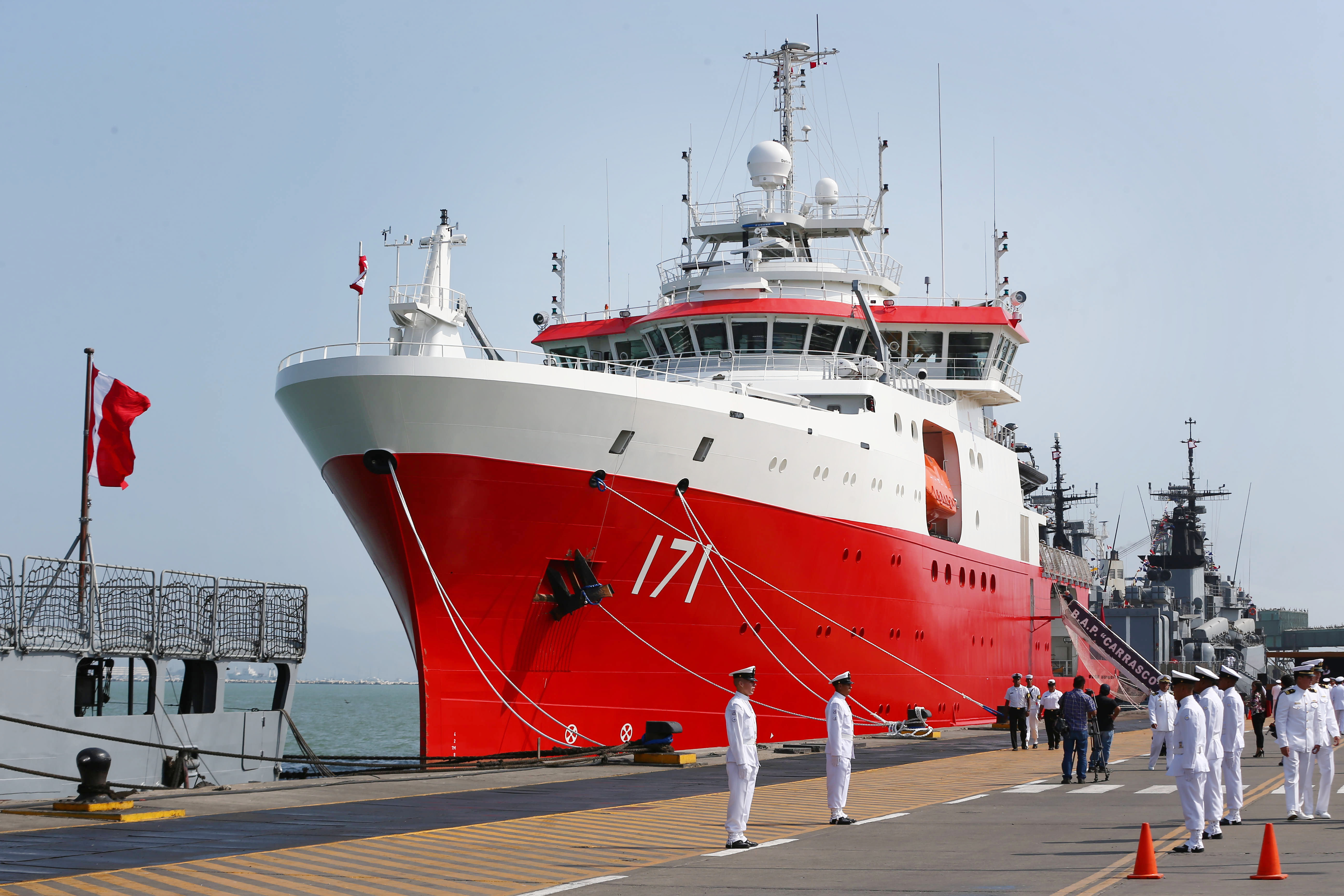
Moored in Callao Navy Base (2017)

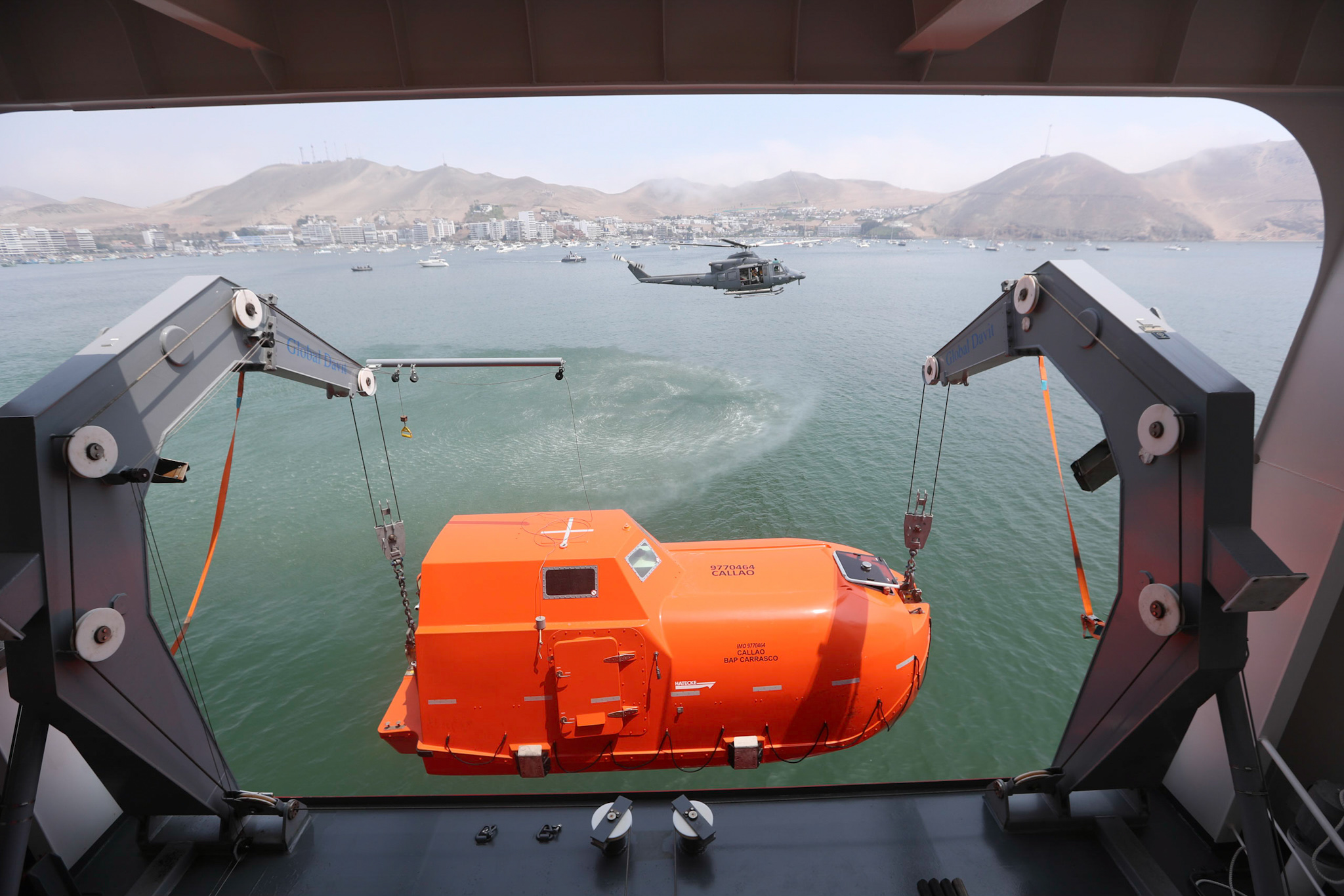
One of Carrasco's lifeboats (2018)

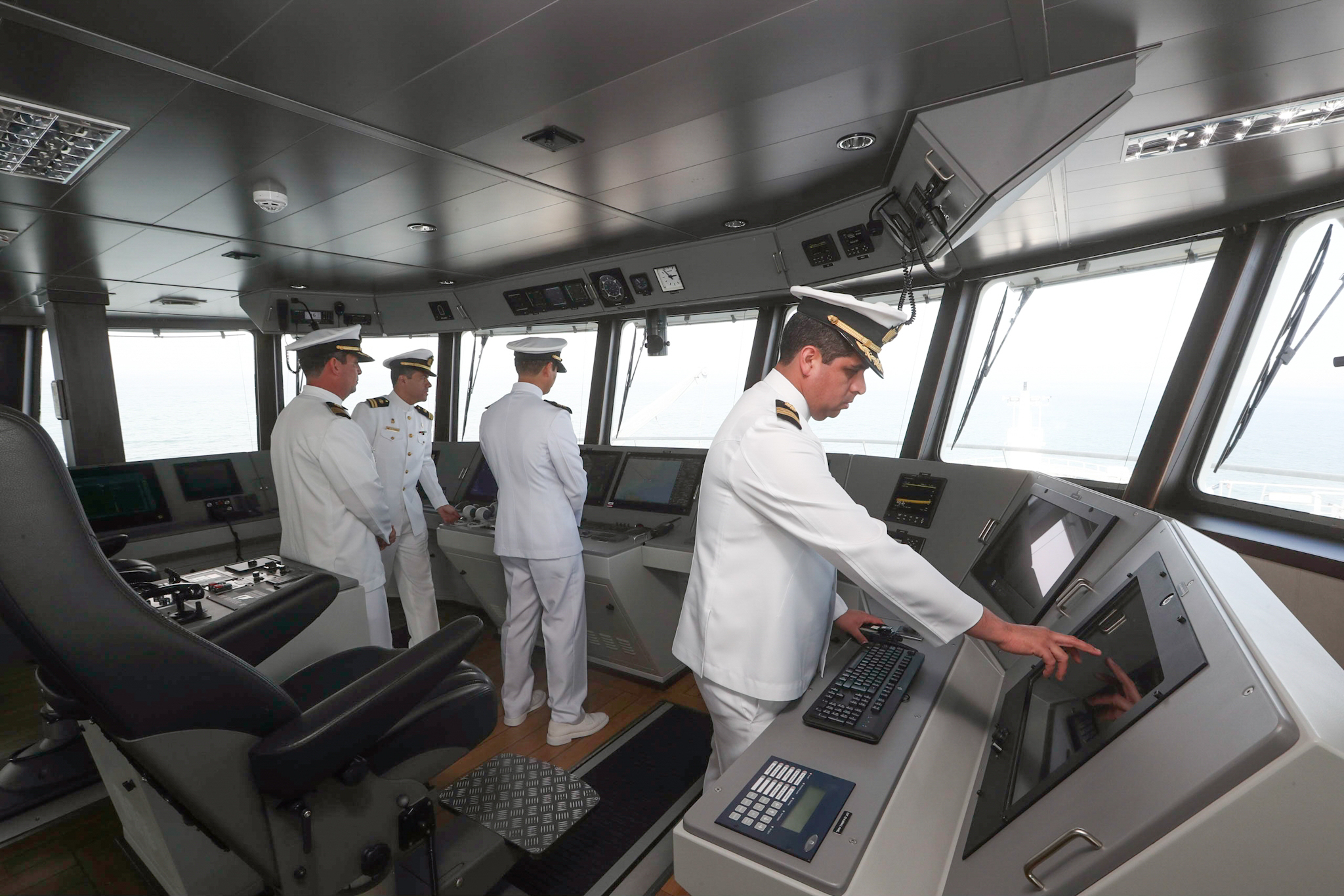
Carrasco's bridge of command (2018)

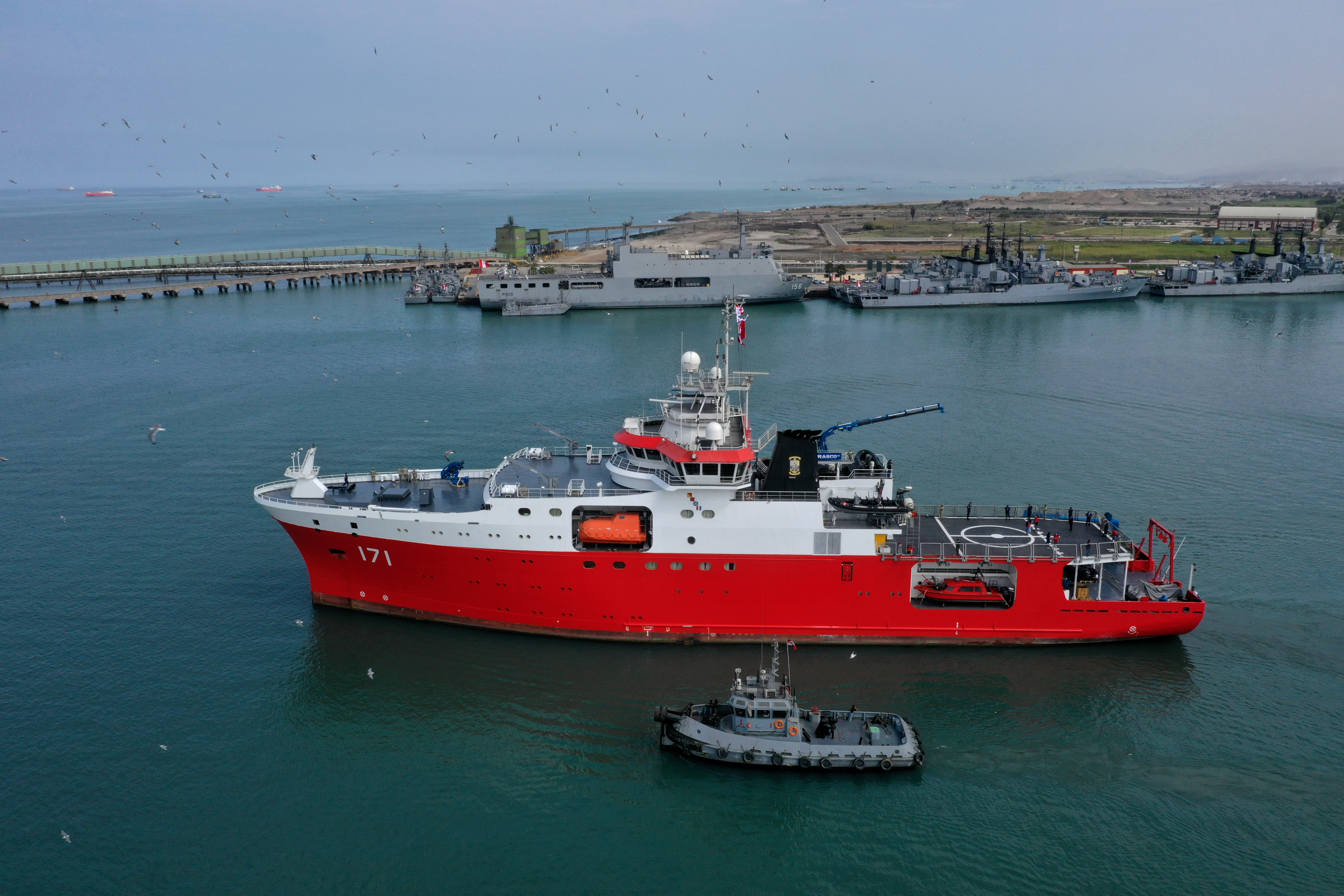
Set sailing to Antarctica (2021)

== See also ==
- List of research vessels by country
