= Juan Carrasco =

Juan Carrasco may refer to:

- Juan Carrasco (apologist) (died c. 1670), apologist, sometimes called Carrasco of Madrid
- Juan Carrasco (high jumper) (born 1958), Spanish Olympic athlete
- Juan Carrasco (explorer), Spanish naval officer, explorer and navigator
- Juan Carrasco (general) (1878–1922), Mexican military general
- Juan Ignacio Carrasco (born 1974), former tennis player from Spain
- Juan Pablo Carrasco (born 1992), Chilean footballer
- Juan Ramón Carrasco (born 1956), Uruguayan football coach and former player
- Juan Manuel Carrasco (born 1976), Peruvian lawyer and Minister of the Interior
