= List of Latin Americans of Spanish descent =

Since the vast majority of Latin Americans from Spanish-speaking countries have at least partial Spanish descent, this is a list of important people in Latin America who have at least one parent or two grandparents who were born in Spain.

== Artists, photographers and fashion designers ==
- Humberto Castro (born 1957), Cuban painter
- Carlos Enríquez Gómez (1900–1957), Cuban painter, illustrator and writer of the Vanguardia movement (the Cuban Avant-garde).
- Raúl Martínez (1927–1995), pop artist and Cuban painter
- Mario Perez (born 1943), painter
- Tomás Sánchez (born 1948), Cuban painter

== TV and Cinema ==
- Angelines Fernández (1922–1994), Spanish actress settled in Mexico.
- Mirtha Legrand (born 1927), Argentine actress and TV host.
- Guillermo del Toro (born 1964), Mexican director and film producer.
- Velia Martínez (1920–1993), American singer and actress.
- Ricardo Montalbán (1920–2009), Mexican actor of Spanish parentage.

== Music ==
- Miguel Bosé (born 1956), Spanish singer with Colombian citizenship
- Gloria Estefan (born 1957), Cuban singer, all four grandparents born in Spain.
- Juanes (born 1972), Colombian singer, Basque ancestry from his father.
- Ernesto Lecuona (1895–1963), Cuban composer and pianist.
- Ricky Martin (born 1971), Puerto Rican singer, part Catalan ancestry.
- Luis Miguel (born 1970), Puerto Rican by birth, raised in Mexico, Spanish father, Italian mother.
- Shakira (born 1977), Colombian singer, part Catalan ancestry.

== Government and military ==
- José Gervasio Artigas (1764–1850)
- Simón Bolívar (1783–1830)
- José Núñez de Cáceres (1772–1846) politics and liberator of Dominican Republic
- Juan Carrasco (1878–1922)
- Fidel Castro (1926–2016), Father was an immigrant to Cuba from Galicia and his mother was also of Spanish origin.
- Manuel Domínguez (1803–1882)
- Juan Manuel Santos (born 1951), President of Colombia
- José Martí (1853–1895)
- Agustín de Iturbide (1783–1824), Liberator of Mexico
- Juan Leal (1676–1742)
- Juan Ponce de León (1474–1521)
- Juan Ponce de León II (1524–1591)
- Francisco de Miranda (1750–1816), Liberator of Venezuela
- José Antonio Páez (1790–1873)
- Carlos Soublette (1789–1870), Libertador of Venezuela
- Antonio José de Sucre (1795–1830)
- Jorge Quiroga (born 1960), President of Bolivia
- Alvaro Garcia Linera (born 1962), Vice President of Bolivia

== Writers ==
- Jorge Luis Borges (1899–1986)
- Pablo Neruda (1904–1973)
- Gabriel García Márquez (1927–2014)

== Others ==
- Juanita García Peraza (1897–1970), Founder of the "Mita congregation", the only Protestant religion of Puerto Rican origin.

== See also ==
- Latin Americans
- White Hispanic and Latino Americans
- List of Criollos
- List of Cubans
