= Óscar Carrasco =

Óscar Carrasco may refer to:

- Óscar Carrasco (Chilean footballer) (1927–1998), Chilean football midfielder
- Óscar Carrasco (Spanish footballer) (born 2002), Spanish football midfielder for Eibar B
