= Pedro Mariano Cabello =

Peruvian politician, 1811–1875

Pedro Mariano Cabello (1811–1875) was a Peruvian academic and politician. He served as the penultimate Chief Cosmographer of the Republic of Peru.

== Early life and education ==
Cabello was born in Moquegua in 1811 and studied in Paris, France.

== Career ==
In 1858, Cabello assumed the role of Chief Cosmographer (Cosmógrafo Mayor) of the Republic of Peru, succeeding Eduardo Carrasco Toro. Cabello was the second-to-last person to hold this position, which originated during the Viceroyalty but had become obsolete by the mid-19th century. During his tenure, he oversaw the elimination of the section dedicated to recording meteorological observations made in Lima.

In 1860, Cabello was elected a member of the Constituent Congress of 1860, representing the province of Moquegua in the Department of Moquegua, which issued the Political Constitution of Peru of 1860, the longest-lasting constitution in Peru's history. He was later elected senator for Moquegua for the Ordinary Congress of 1860, serving until 1863, and again in 1864.
