= Machu Picchu Base =

Peruvian research facility in Antarctica

Machu Picchu Station
- Antarctic station
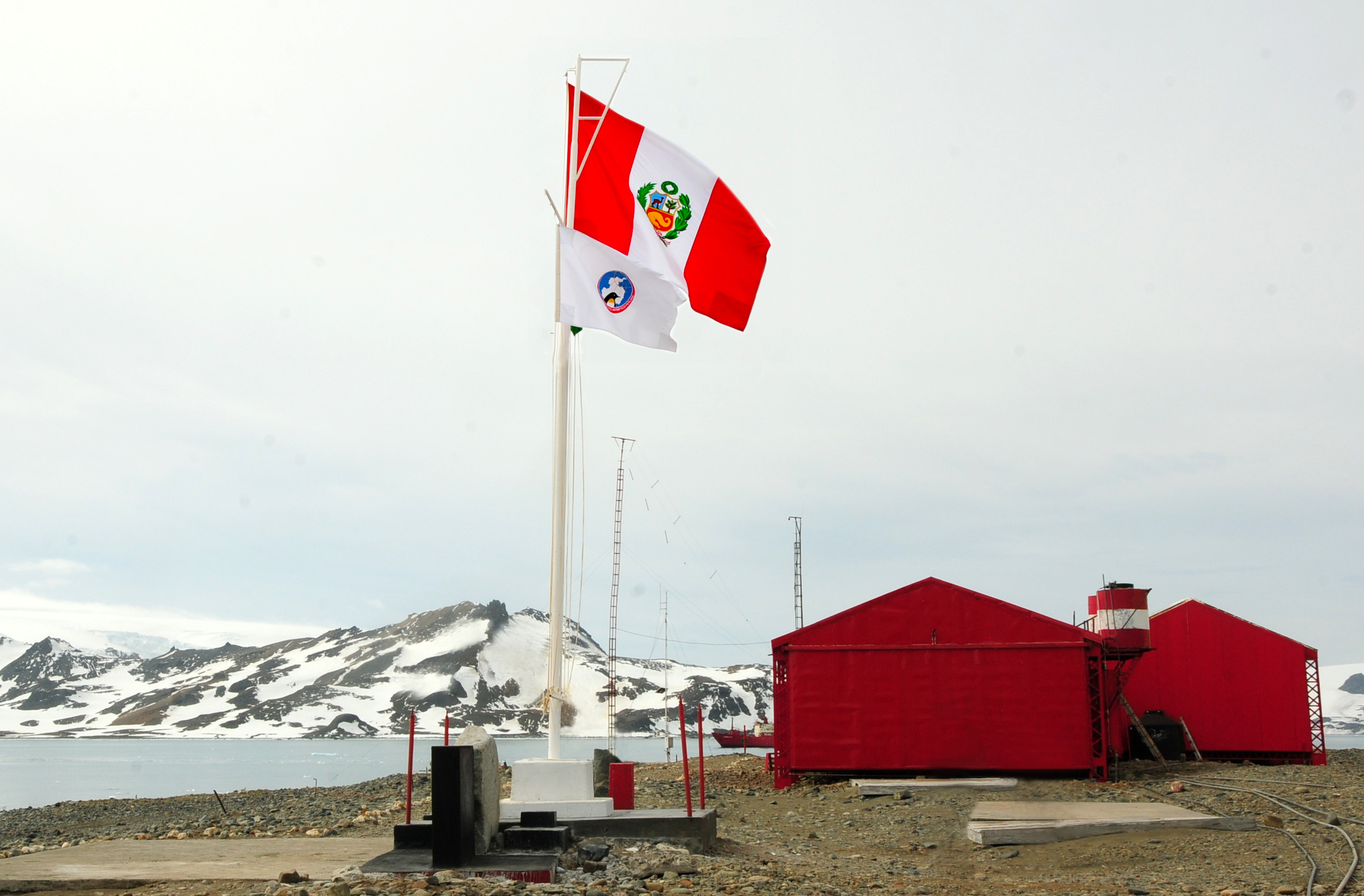
- Machu Picchu Base in February 2013

- Location of Machu Picchu Station in Antarctica
- Coordinates: 62°05′29″S 58°28′12″W
- Country: Peru
- Location in Antarctica: King George Island; South Shetland Islands; Antarctica
- Administered by: Instituto Antártico Peruano (INANPE)
- Established: January 1989
- Elevation: 3.5 m (11 ft)

Population (2017)
  - Summer: 30
  - Winter: 0
- Time zone: AST (UTC-04:00)
- Type: Seasonal
- Period: Summer
- Status: Operational
- Activities: List: Climatology; Geodesy; Geology; Hydrology; Marine biology; Oceanography; Sedimentology

The Machu Picchu Scientific Base is a Peruvian polar scientific research facility in Antarctica, established to conduct Antarctic research on geology, climatology and biology. More specifically, its purpose is to study the continent's geological past, potential sea resources, wind strengths, air pollution, and the animal adaptation in a freezing environment. The base is named after the World Heritage Site Machu Picchu.

== Geography ==
Being located at 62°S, Machu Picchu Base is one of the northernmost settlements in Antarctica. It, along with Artigas Base, Carlini Base, Arctowski Station and Villa Las Estrellas, forms the only human settlements on King George Island, on Admiralty Bay.

== Research base and expeditions ==
Machu Picchu Base conducts annual scientific expeditions to Antarctica. The base carries out a variety of scientific projects such as research into krill and its potential as an alternative human food source, as well as geological, biological, hydrographic, and geophysical research, under the provisions of the Antarctic Treaty. The base operates radar measuring upper atmospheric winds, and supplying data on the deterioration of the ozone layer.

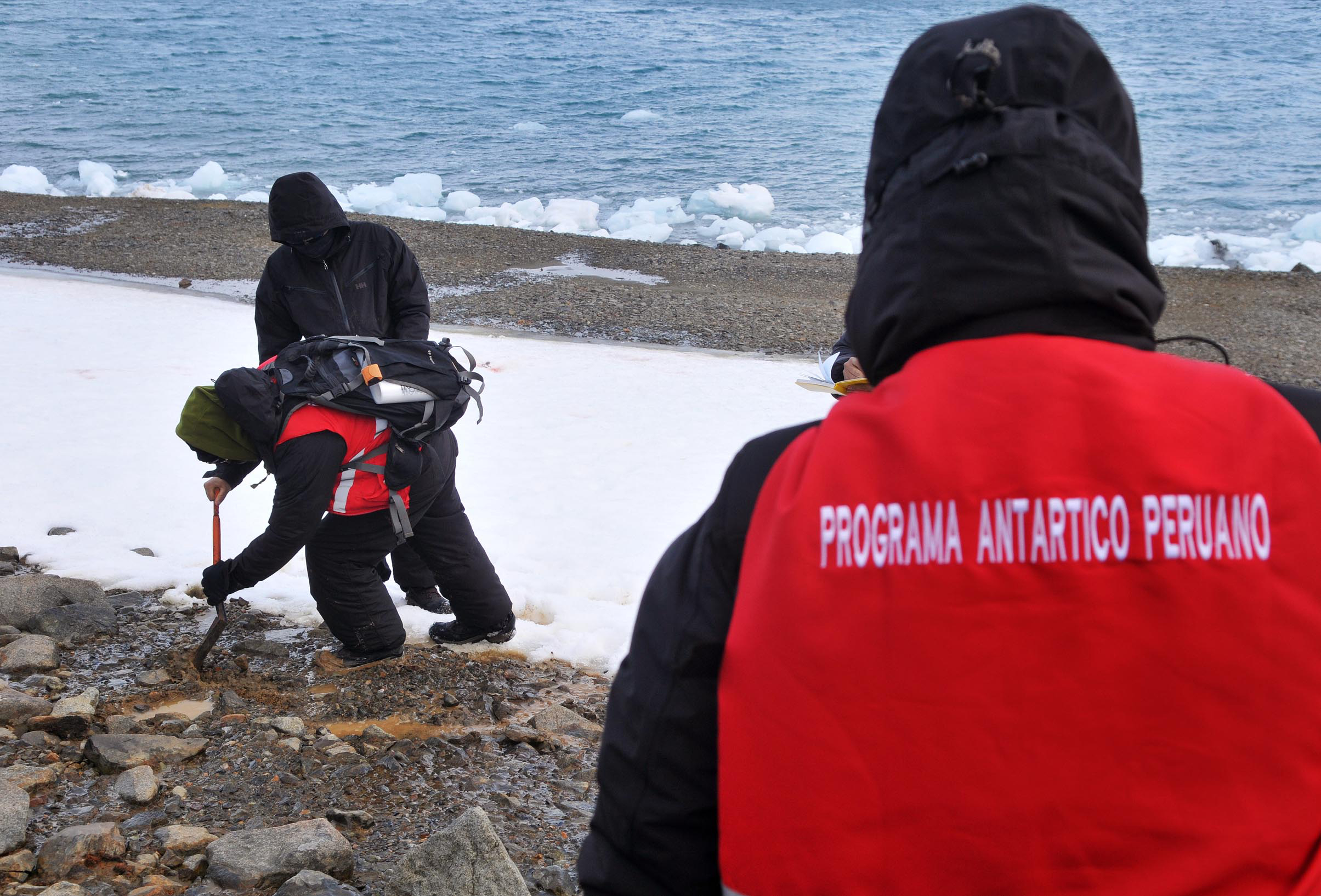
Peruvian expeditionaries in Antarctica in January 2015, at the Machu Picchu Base.

As Antarctica is a continent of valuable strategic, ecological, and economic importance, Peru has an interest in maintaining its status as a non-militarized, nuclear-free zone of peace, and in preserving its environment, which is important to the Peruvian climate. Its frigid waters, the origin of the Humboldt Current, are essential to Peru's marine and coastal ecosystems.

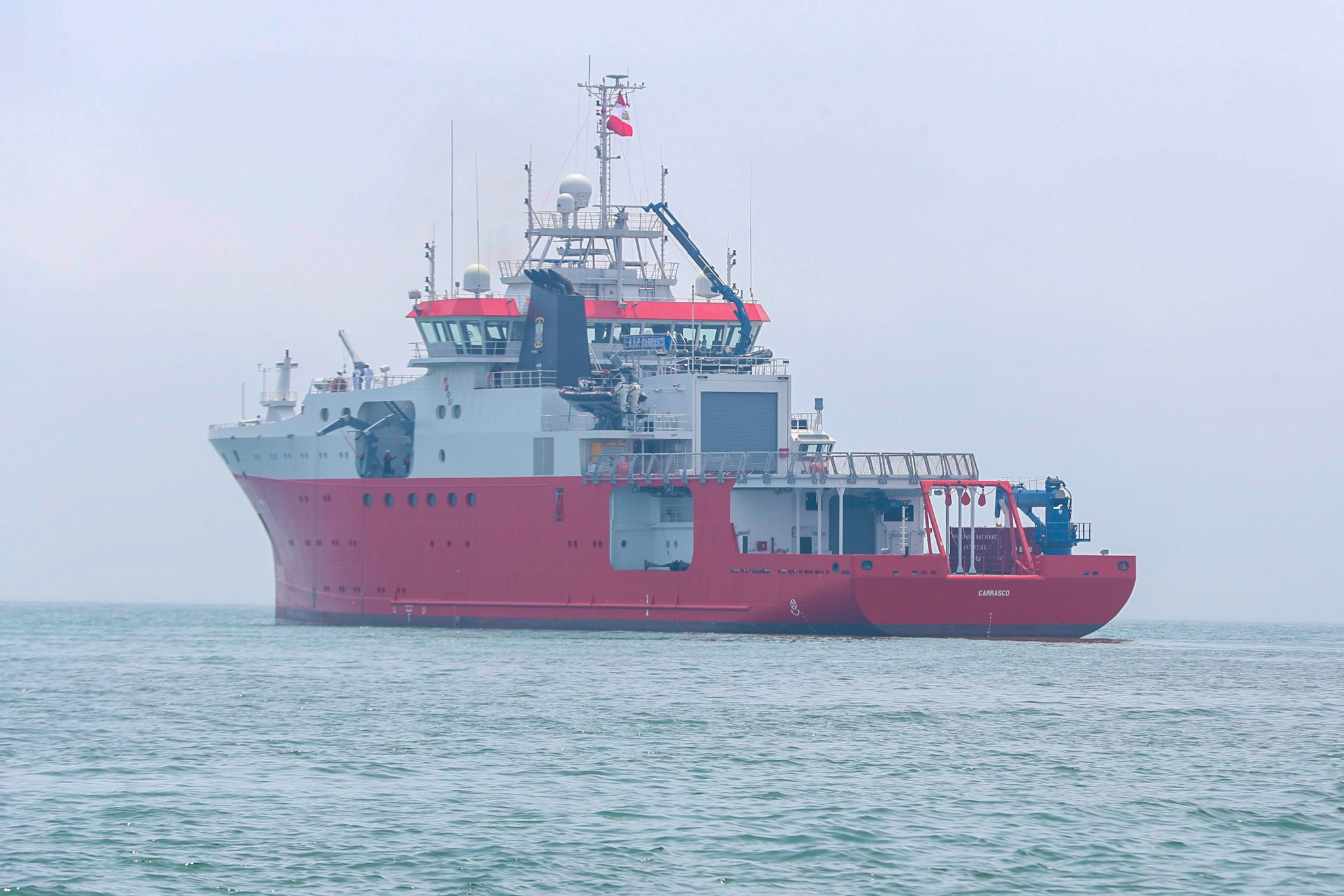
Polar oceanographic vessel BAP Carrasco, Peru's access platform to Antarctica

Since 1988, maintenance, supply, and transport of personnel for the base have been performed by the Instituto del Mar de Perú's scientific research vessel B.I.C. Humboldt. However, in 2017 the Peruvian government replaced that ship with its new Polar Class 7 research vessel BAP Carrasco.

=== Peruvian claim ===
In 1976 the Geographical Society of Lima claimed rights to a sector of Antarctica between the meridians 81°20' W (corresponding to Punta Pariñas) and 75°40' W (corresponding to Rinconada South Beach). This initiative led to a declaration by the Peruvian Constitutional Assembly on 3 May 1979:

The Constituent Assembly declared that Peru, a country of the southern hemisphere, linked to the Antarctic for the coasts that are projected toward her, as well as ecological and historical factors, supports the validity of an international regime that, while not diminishing the rights which to the nation, secure the benefit of all humanity, the rational and equitable exploitation of resources of that continent.

However, the claim is not officially recognized as one of the Territorial claims in Antarctica.

In 1981 the director of Instituto Peruano de Estudios Antárticos, Luis Vilchez Lara, made a press statement expressing its view that Peru is entitled to an Antarctic sector 600.000 km2 between the meridians 84° and 90° West and to the South Pole. Vilchez Lara based its opinion based on the theory of plural condo of Fauchille, and the application of the principle of uti possidetis.

On 10 April 1981, Peru joined the Antarctic Treaty as a member adherent, with voice and vote in making all decisions related to the southern area. However, in agreeing to the Treaty, Peru reserved its rights to territory and influence over Antarctic climate, ecology and marine biology, in addition to a continuity of geology and historical links. In 1989 when Machu Picchu Base was founded, it acquired the status of advisory member within the Antarctic Treaty.

In 1993 the Constituent Assembly extended the declaration of 1979:

The Democratic Congress of Representatives proclaims that Peru, a country of the Southern Hemisphere, linked to the Antarctica by the coasts that project towards it, as well as ecological factors and historical precedents, and, in accordance with its rights and obligations as an advisory member of the Antarctic Treaty, favors the conservation of Antarctica as a Peace Zone dedicated to scientific research, and the continued vitality of an international protocol which, without detriment to the rights of Peru as a nation, would promote the benefit of Humanity at large and an egalitarian usufruct of the resources of Antarctica and ensure the protection and preservation of this continent's ecosystem.

=== Regulatory authorities ===
The Peruvian government created a National Commission for Antarctic Affairs (CONAAN) in July 1983 as a technical body composed of various agencies. It was charged with:

- advising the government on Antarctic matters concerning law, politics, economics, science, and technology.
- carrying out the national objective of ensuring a Peruvian presence in Antarctica
- monitoring the protection and conservation of its environment.

On 20 November 2002 CONAAN was reconstituted as the Peruvian Antarctic Institute (INANPE), a decentralized agency incorporated under domestic law and having scientific, technical, functional, economic, and administrative autonomy, organized under the Ministry of Foreign Affairs. It had the same tasks as CONAAN, and on top coordinates all Peruvian activities in the Antarctic.

== See also ==
- List of Antarctic research stations
- List of Antarctic field camps
