= José Carrasco =

José Carrasco may refer to:

- José Carrasco Torrico (1863–1921), Bolivian vice president
- José Carrasco Tapia (1943–1986), Chilean journalist
- José Carrasco (politician) (1944–2015), Peruvian politician
- José Alirio Carrasco (born 1976), Colombian long-distance runner
- José Antonio Carrasco (born 1980), Spanish cyclist
- José Luis Carrasco (born 1982), Spanish cyclist
- José Carrasco (footballer, born 1988), Spanish footballer
- José Carrasco (volleyball) (born 1989), Venezuelan volleyball player
- José Carrasco (footballer, born 1994), Spanish footballer

== See also ==
- San José de Carrasco, Uruguayan neighborhood
