= María Carrasco =

Spanish singer

- Born: María Carrasco Jiménez; 15 July 1995 (age 31)
- Origin: Torrecera, Jerez de la Frontera Cádiz, Spain
- Genres: Flamenco, pop
- Occupation: Singer
- Instruments: Vocals, spanish guitar
- Years active: 2005–present
- Labels: Senador (2007–2010); Universal (2011–2013); La Niña de Torrecera (2014–present)
- Website: http://maria-carrasco.net

María Carrasco (born 15 July 1995) is a Spanish singer.

Her biggest success to date came with the debut album Hablando con la Luna, which she released at the age of 11. It hit number seven in the Spanish charts. The album featured her debut single "Abuelo" ("Grandfather").

== Discography ==
=== Studio albums ===
No.	Title	Details	Charts
No.	Title	Details	SPA
1	Hablando con la luna	Released: 12 January 2007; Label: Senador; Formats: CD	7
2	Soñando despierta	Released: 10 December 2007; Label: Senador; Formats: CD	49
3	Entre tu y yo	Released: 16 March 2009; Label: Senador; Formats: CD	
4	Pequeño deseo	Released: 28 February 2012; Label: Universal; Formats: CD	35
5	Misterios de mi alma	Released: 28 April 2014; Label: Karonte; Formats: CD	
