= Maruja Carrasco =

Spanish botanist (1944–2018)

- Born: María Andrea Carrasco de Salazar; 4 February 1944; Madrid, Spain
- Died: 1 August 2018 (aged 74); Madrid, Spain
- Education: Complutense University of Madrid
- Known for: Name new genera, species, and subspecies for science
- Spouse: José María López Sancho
- Scientific career
- Fields: Botany
- Workplaces: Complutense University of Madrid; University of Chicago; Royal Spanish Society of Natural History
- Author abbrev. (botany): Carrasco

María Andrea Carrasco de Salazar, best known as Maruja Carrasco (4 February 1944 – 1 August 2018), was a Spanish botanist and academic. She had a key role in the modernization of herbaria in Spain.

In 1967 she graduated in Biological Section Sciences, from the Complutense University of Madrid. A daughter of teachers, she always had an interest in teaching and, from that moment, began her relationship as a teacher, since she was hired as a teacher of practical classes, while the compatibility with a grant in the "Nuclear Energy Board". The following year, in 1968, she decided to leave for the United States, where she was hired by the University of Chicago for two years. Upon her return to Spain, she became assistant professor at the Faculty of Biological Sciences of the Complutense University of Madrid. That same year she began his doctoral thesis, directed by Francisco Bellot. Finally, in 1979 she obtained, by opposition, her position as university professor. Until 2004, she was Full Professor of that University.

She has published more than 100 works, after more than 30 years devoted to botany, and has trained several researchers such as, for example, Gonzalo Nieto Feliner, Modesto Luceño, Luis Balaguer or Inés Álvarez Fernández. In addition, she has directed the doctoral thesis of Ildefonso Barrera, Carmen Monge, Alejandro Romero and Carlos Martín Blanco.

In addition, she has been a consultant for the volumes VII, X, XIV and XXI of Flora Iberica, a project that, until his death, addressed her great friend Santiago Castroviejo.

In 1981 she became the Conservator of the Herbarium of the Faculty of Biology, a collection hat had been established 12 years previously, and had about 3000 specimens. When in 2004 Maruja Carrasco left the herbarium, it had more than 100,000 sheets.

Her interest and work with herbalists led her to be a founding member of the "Association of Ibero-Macaronesian Herbaria" (AHIM), with many other researchers, such as María Dalila Espírito Santo, from Lisbon, Luis Villar, from Huesca, and Mauricio Velayos, from Madrid. In addition, between 2000 and 2003 she was Vice President of the AHIM.

In 2013, the annual volume of the scientific journal Botánica Complutense was dedicated to her, with a prologue written by his friend Mauricio Velayos.

== Honors ==
- Salsola marujae, a plant from the Canary Islands.
