= Priscilla Carrasco =

American photographer (born 1933)

Priscilla Carrasco (born 1933) is an American photographer.

Her work is included in the collections of the Art Institute of Chicago, the Portland Art Museum and the Center for Creative Photography

Carrasco's book Praise Old Believers weaves together text and photographs of Old Believers in Oregon and Alaska from 1966 to 1987.
