= Juan Carrasco (apologist) =

Spanish friar (died c. 1670)

Juan Carrasco (died c. 1670) was an apologist, of Marrano parentage. He was born in Madrid and is sometimes called Carrasco of Madrid.

Carrasco had first been an Augustinian friar at Burgos and an excellent preacher.

Later, on a journey to Rome, he became a convert to Judaism at Livorno.

He was familiar with the writings of Nahmanides, Isaac Abravanel, and others, and while in Holland (probably at Amsterdam, where he was circumcised) he wrote in Spanish his "Apology of Judaism." This work was published at Nodriza (The Hague) in 1633, and was later incorporated in the "Coleccion de Reformadores Españoles" published by Benjamin Wiffen, who believed Carrasco to have been a Protestant.
