= Eduardo Carrasco Toro =

Peruvian academic and politician (1779–1865)

Eduardo Carrasco y Toro
- Born: October 13, 1779
- Died: November 16, 1865 (aged 86); Lima
- Occupations: academic and politician

Eduardo Carrasco y Toro (October 13, 1779 – November 16, 1865) was a Peruvian academic and politician, who held the position of Chief Cosmographer of the Republic of Peru.

== Early life and education ==
Eduardo Carrasco y Toro was the son of José Sanz Carrasco and Dolores Toro Valdéz y Noriega. He studied at the Real Convictorio de San Carlos and, from 1794, at the Royal Academy of Nautical Sciences.

== Career ==
Due to his aptitude for mathematics, Eduardo was incorporated into the teaching staff of this academy and was appointed second professor in 1806. He was reported to the Inquisition for owning forbidden books and recommending them for reading.

In 1820 Eduardo Carrasco Toro was imprisoned for preparing coastal maps for the Liberation Expedition. After the independence of Peru was achieved, he took office as secretary general of war, through which the National Navy of Peru was established. He was a member of the Patriotic Society. In 1822, he was appointed commander of the Corps of Pilots and director-general of the Nautical School. As a representative of Huancavelica, he attended the First Constituent Congress.

He was one of the sixty-five deputies elected in 1825 by the Supreme Court, who were called to approve the Lifetime Constitution of Venezuelan statesman and military officer Simón Bolívar. However, despite the congress being convened, it decided not to assume any powers and never functioned.

In 1839, he was appointed Chief Cosmographer of Peru and professor of First Mathematics at the University of San Marcos. He drafted the "Guide for Foreigners" from 1841 to 1857.

== Death ==
Eduardo Carrasco y Toro died in Lima on November 16, 1865.

In 2016, the Peruvian government decided to name its polar oceanographic vessel BAP Carrasco (BOP-171) in recognition of his work.

== See also ==
- Pedro Mariano Cabello
