= Baldemar Carrasco =

Chilean politician (1931–2025)

Baldemar Carroso
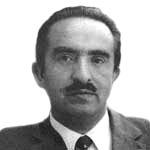

Member of the Chamber of Deputies
- In office 11 March 1990 – 11 March 1994
- In office 15 May 1969 – 21 September 1973

Personal details
- Born: Baldemar Carrasco Muñoz; 24 September 1931 Coyhaique, Chile
- Died: 8 February 2025 (aged 93)
- Party: PDC
- Education: Pontifical Catholic University of Valparaíso
- Occupation: Academic

Baldemar Carrasco Muñoz (24 September 1931 – 8 February 2025) was a Chilean politician. A member of the Christian Democratic Party, he served in the Chamber of Deputies from 1969 to 1973 and again from 1990 to 1994.

Carrasco died on 8 February 2025, at the age of 93.

== Biography ==
He was born to Juan Carrasco Noches and Eufemia Muñoz Novoa. He is married to Ema Morales Provoste, and they have two children. He completed primary school at Escuela General Baquedano "Siervos de María" in Coyhaique and secondary school at the Liceo de La Unión.

He graduated as a Spanish teacher from the Pedagogy School at the Pontifical Catholic University of Valparaíso in 1958. He began teaching at the Marist Brothers' school in Quillota and the Liceo Rubén Castro in Valparaíso (1955–1958). He then became Vice-Principal of the "San Felipe Dionisio" Liceo in Coyhaique (1959–1965) and later Director of the Agricultural School of Coyhaique (until 1969).

He went on to serve as General Manager of the Regional Development Corporation of Aysén (CODESA) and was active in the Region's Chamber of Commerce, among other social institutions.

He joined the Christian Democratic Party in 1957. He later served as party local president (1958–1960), provincial president (1965–1969), and delegate to the National Board (1967–1968), and provincial party president again in 1969.

He was elected regidor (councilman) of Coyhaique (1963–1967). During the military dictatorship, he directed the “No” campaign in Aysén. Under the presidencies of Eduardo Frei Ruiz-Tagle and Ricardo Lagos, he worked in the Regional Intendancy of Coyhaique, holding positions such as Chief of Staff and International Delegate. On 5 October 2017, he was appointed representative of the President of the Republic to the Superior Council of the University of Aysén.

He co-founded the Corporación de Desarrollo Aysén por Aysén, where he serves as Executive Secretary.
