= José Carrasco (footballer, born 1994) =

Spanish footballer

Personal information
- Full name: José Manuel Ruiz Carrasco
- Date of birth: 19 December 1994 (age 31)
- Place of birth: Caudete, Spain
- Height: 1.75 m (5 ft 9 in)
- Position: Midfielder

Team information
- Current team: Villarrobledo

Youth career
- Albacete

Senior career*
Years	Team	Apps	(Gls)
2013–2017	Albacete B	77	(3)
2014–2015	Albacete	4	(0)
2017–2019	La Roda	23	(1)
2019–2021	Atlético Ibañés	52	(3)
2021–2022	Huracán Balazote	28	(0)
2022–	Villarrobledo	50	(0)
- * Club domestic league appearances and goals as of 13 October 2024

José Manuel Ruiz Carrasco (born 19 December 1994) is a Spanish footballer who plays for Villarrobledo as a central midfielder.

== Club career ==
Born in Caudete, Albacete, Castilla-La Mancha, Carrasco finished his formation with local Albacete Balompié, making his senior debuts with the reserves in the Tercera División. On 1 June 2014 he made his first team debut, starting in a 1–1 away draw against Racing de Santander in the Segunda División B play-offs.

Carrasco also appeared in the second leg seven days later, again as a starter in a 3–2 home win, with his side returning to the Segunda División after a three-year absence. On 17 December 2014 he played his first professional match with the first team, starting in a 0–0 away draw against Levante UD in the season's Copa del Rey.
