= B.I.C. Humboldt =

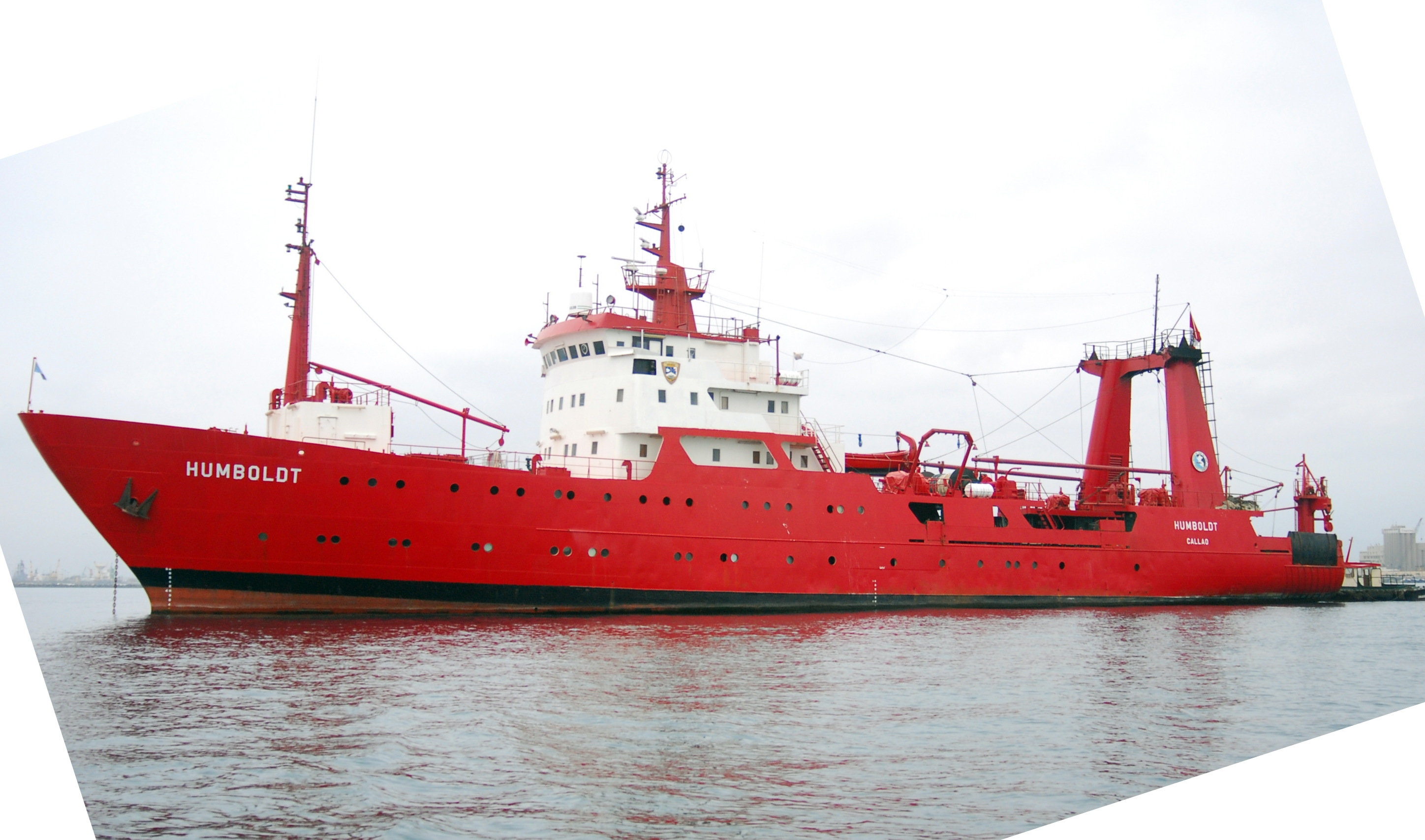

History

Peru
- Name: Humboldt
- Namesake: Alexander von Humboldt
- Builder: SIMA Peru, Callao
- Launched: 13 October 1978
- Identification: IMO number: 6708692; MMSI number: 760106000; Callsign: OASC
- Status: in active service

General characteristics
- Tonnage: 600 long tons deadweight (DWT)
- Displacement: 1,731 long tons (1,759 t)
- Length: 75.2 m (246 ft 9 in) o/a; 66 m (216 ft 6 in) p/p
- Beam: 12.6 m (41 ft 4 in)
- Installed power: 2 × 3,088 kW (4,141 hp), and 1 × 1,088 kW (1,459 hp) generators
- Propulsion: B&W Alpha diesel engine
- Speed: 13 knots (24 km/h; 15 mph)

B.I.C. Humboldt is a Peruvian oceanographic research vessel, with polar capacity, built in 1978, by SIMA shipyard in Callao, Peru, in cooperation with the German Government. The ship has a capacity of 100 people, including crew and scientific staff. The vessel has visited Antarctica on several occasions to assist the Peruvian Antarctic Machu Picchu Base. In 1989 the BIC Humboldt was the subject of a strengthening of the hull and other modifications and improvements after she ran aground off King Georges Island in the Antarctic.

This vessel was designed and built under the criteria of the Instituto del Mar del Peru (IMARPE) by SIMA Peru Shipyards for scientific research. The BIC Humboldt has the most modern equipment and instruments for scientific technology. In 2010 the ship entered a shipyard to undergo maintenance for a strengthened hull, engine replacement and modernization of all its systems, to meet the stringent international standards for polar research vessels.

In 2012 the Scientific Research Vessel (BIC) Humboldt returned to activity, and in December, it set sail to Peru's scientific station in Antarctica. During the two-month mission will be carried out environmental studies, physics and biology. Unlike other years, in which scientific work is conducted on land, this time will be held on board. The BIC Humboldt, repowered with new equipment, will act as a comprehensive research base.
