= Luis Carrasco =

Luis Carrasco may refer to:

- Luis Carrasco (skeleton racer)
- Luis Carrasco (basketball)
