= List of Criollos =

This is a list of notable criollos. All people considered as criollos, i.e., people who are direct descendants of Spanish, having a reliable source that says, are in this list.

== TV and cinema ==
- Angelines Fernández
- María Montez
- Guillermo del Toro

== Music ==
- Miguel Bosé
- Juanes
- Kike Santander
- Gustavo Santander

== Government and military ==
- José Artigas
- Simón Bolívar
- Fidel Castro
- Manuel Dominguez
- José Martí
- Agustín de Iturbide
- Juan Leal
- Juan Ponce de León II
- Francisco de Miranda
- Bernardo O'Higgins

== Writers ==
- Jorge Luis Borges
- Mario Vargas Llosa

== See also ==
- Latin Americans
- White Hispanic and Latino Americans
