= Óscar Carrasco (Chilean footballer) =

Chilean footballer (1927-1998)

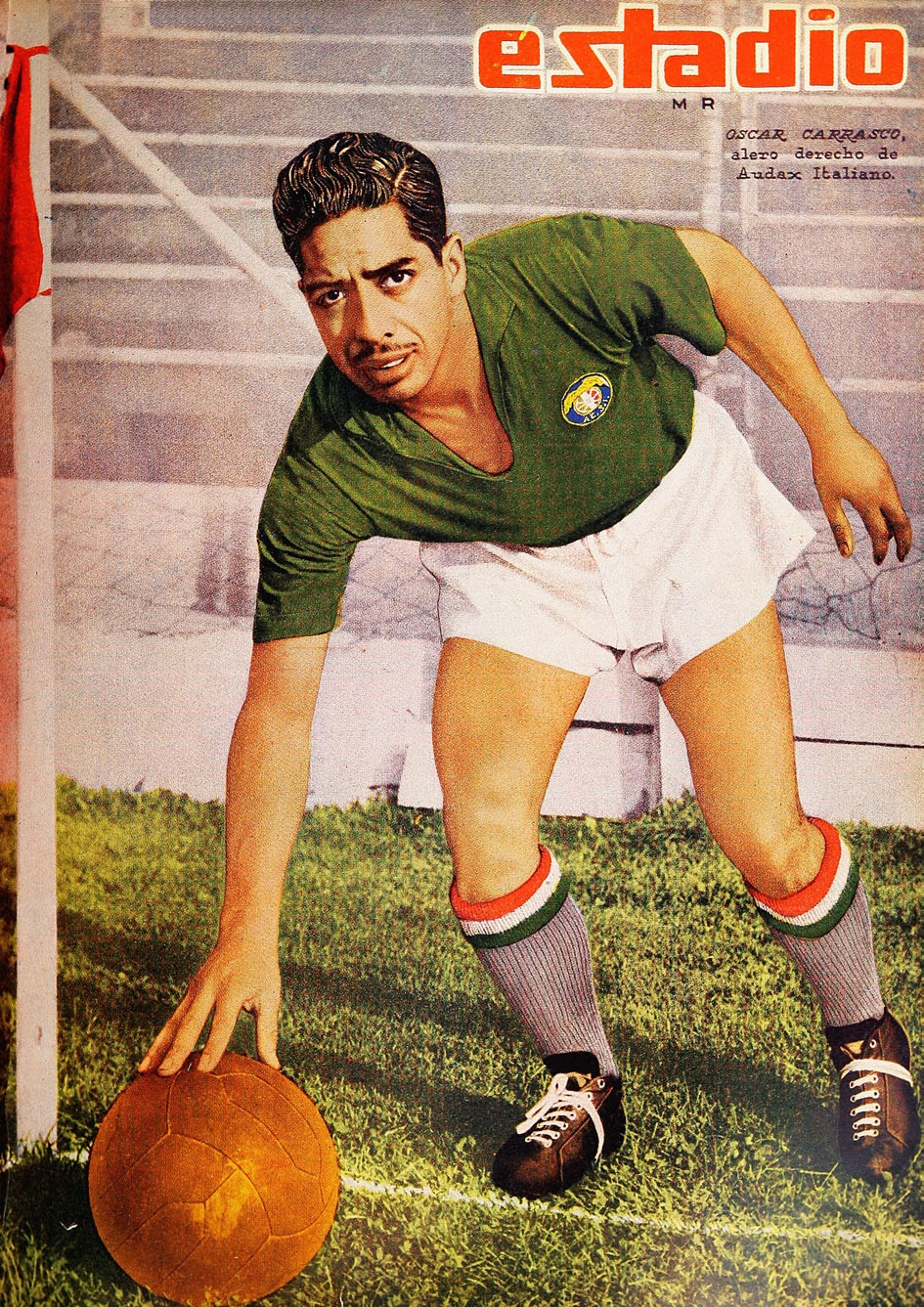

Personal information
- Date of birth: 26 November 1927
- Date of death: 31 August 1998 (aged 70)
- Position: Midfielder

Senior career*
Years	Team	Apps	(Gls)
- Audax Italiano

International career
1953–1957	Chile	6	(0)
- * Club domestic league appearances and goals

Óscar Carrasco (26 November 1927 – 31 August 1998) was a Chilean footballer. He played in six matches for the Chile national football team from 1953 to 1957. He was also part of Chile's squad for the 1953 South American Championship.
