= Juan Carrasco (general) =

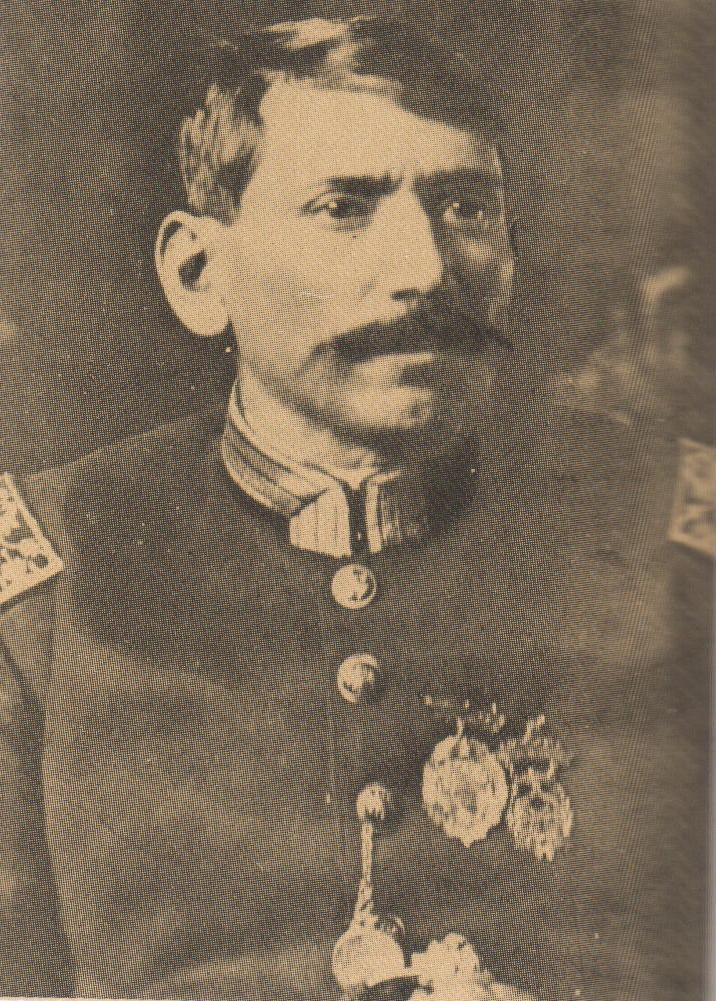
- Born: June 24, 1878; Mazatlán, Sinaloa, Mexico
- Died: November 8, 1922 (aged 44); Nayarit, Mexico
- Occupation: Military

General Juan Carrasco (June 24, 1878 – November 8, 1922) was a Mexican rancher and military officer who participated in the Mexican Revolution. He was Chief of Military Operations of Baja California, Sonora, Sinaloa, and Nayarit.

== Early life ==
Juan Carrasco was born in Puerta de Canoas, Mazatlán (Sinaloa, Mexico) on June 24, 1878, to Luciano Carrasco and Santos Aguirre. Carrasco was raised in El Potrero de Carrasco, near Mazatlán.

When he was eight years old, he was sent to study in Mazatlán, only to return three months later after his father died. He never went back to school and, according to his biographer, he could not read or write. He dedicated himself to supporting the family by selling limes.

== During the Revolution ==
Carrasco was a strong supporter of the presidential candidate Francisco I. Madero. In 1910, he supported the Plan de San Luis Potosí written by Madero, which called upon the Mexican people to revolt against the government of General Porfirio Díaz. Carrasco enlisted in the military forces of General Justo Tirado. His unit consisted of 150 men and he participated in several clashes, including in La Noria, Venadillo, Rosario, the gorge of El Limón and Mazatlán. After Madero's victory and the signing of the treaties of Ciudad Juarez, he returned home. He considered himself to be a farmer and not a soldier.

In 1913, his former commander, Jesús Tirado, started a violent uprising against the government of Madero. Carrasco chose to fight again. In March 1913, Victoriano Huerta ordered the capture of the Sinaloa governor, Felipe Riveros. When Carrasco learned of Riveros's arrest, he raised a small combat unit of 50 men and began disrupting guerrilla communications and federal troop movements on trains. Alerted by friends in Mazatlan to Huerta's plans of apprehending him, he left home and fought battles in La Bola and El Potrero Chico with Captain Meza and Juan Cañedo. After combat in El Limón and El Venado, he fought in La Loma, defeating 60 soldiers and seizing 80 horses. While there, he also seized arms, ammunition, and additional men, with whom he continued on to Concordia. Those fights continued in La Noria and Modesto.

On September 9, 1913, Carrasco captured the Quila plaza and then fought in El Habal and The Venadillo. General Alberto T. Rasgado, commanding an army of 1500 men, pursued Carrasco, fighting battles in places such as Sequeiros, Badiraguato, Comederos, El Zopilote, El Conchi, The Milkweed, and Tierra Blanca. In El Conchi, Carrasco's troops defeated a federal unit of the second battalion of army engineers and a fraction of the eighth battalion. He captured two pieces of artillery and many prisoners. In 1914, Carrasco fought together with General Ramón F. Iturbe in the Mazatlán plaza.

Carrasco rose to the rank of brigadier general on November 1, 1915. He was appointed head of several military districts. In 1919, he asked for permission from the Secretary of War to leave the army and accept the nomination of governor of Sinaloa, having been persuaded by his friends to do so. The fall of President Venustiano Carranza, whom Carrasco supported, forced him to abandon his political plans. He also disassociated himself from General Angel Flores, and championed the "anti-Obregonista" cause. On November 8, 1922, Carrasco confronted enemy forces in Guamuchilito, while he was on his way to Durango to join General Francisco Murguía. He died in the hand-to-hand combat that ensued. He was buried in the cemetery of El Potrero.

== Personal life ==
Carrasco married Manuela Lizarraga and, together, raised two children, Rafael and Concepción.

Sinaloan historian and writer, José C. Valdés, described Juan Carrasco thus: "Juan Carrasco was one of the most salient characterizations of the rural Mexican Revolution. Rustic and illiterate, but generous and honest, he had a creative vocation. Intuitive by nature, he loved freedom. He believed in the social and political equality of men. He was excited about progress. He had a lively intelligence and was enterprising, and felt a real passion for authority and government. He lacked, however, like the vast majority of rural people, a sense of anticipation, so he didn't have the career that he aspired to, which, given his qualities, he deserved."

In 1910, by the end of the revolution, he was known by the nickname "El Calero." All his soldiers were volunteers; many were relatives and most of the others had worked with him. He let the soldiers decide their organization and leaders. A strong believer in justice and loyalty, Carrasco let his units execute any compatriot who killed a fellow-soldier.

Carrasco thought of himself as a humble servant of the army and the people, whose duty was to satisfy their aspirations. On several occasions, he was offered high positions, but refused them.

== Legacy ==
- The bravery and fame of Carrasco - the man on horseback - are recorded in songs. Some Sinaloan streets are named after him.
- El Potrero de Carrasco, where Juan Carrasco was raised, is named after him.
- The General Juan Carrasco Primary School was also named after Carrasco.
- Francisco Muro Rousse says of Carrasco: "He was loved and was welcomed with devotion. He was sort of an idol of the people."
