= Elleke Boehmer =

British novelist and literary critic (born 1961)

Elleke Boehmer FRSL
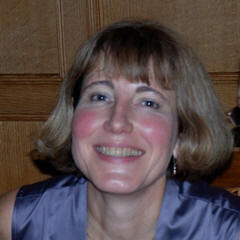
- Born: 1961 (age 64–65); Durban, South Africa
- Occupations: Novelist, literary critic and academic

Academic work
- Discipline: Postcolonial Studies
- Institutions: University of Oxford

Elleke Boehmer, FRSL, FRHistS (born 1961) is Professor of World Literature in English at the University of Oxford, and a Professorial Governing Body Fellow at Wolfson College. She is an acclaimed novelist, internationally recognised for her research in colonial and postcolonial literature, history and theory. Her main areas of interest include the literature of empire and resistance to empire; sub-Saharan African and South Asian literatures; modernism; migration and diaspora; feminism, masculinity, and identity; nationalism; terrorism; J. M. Coetzee, Katherine Mansfield, and Nelson Mandela; and life writing.

With her fiction, Boehmer has established an international reputation as a commentator on the impacts and aftereffects of colonial history, in particular in post-apartheid South Africa and postcolonial Britain.

== Biography ==
Elleke Boehmer was born to Dutch parents in Durban, South Africa. She studied towards a degree in English and Modern languages in the Eastern Cape, followed by an incomplete year of studying medicine.

In this period, she became profoundly influenced by the Black Consciousness thought of the activist leader Steve Biko. After a year and a half of teaching English in Mamelodi township, outside Tshwane (formerly Pretoria) in what is now Gauteng, she won a Rhodes Scholarship to the University of Oxford. She completed an MPhil degree in English Literature 1900 to the present, followed by a doctoral thesis on gendered constructions of the nation in post-independence West and East African literature, both at St. John's College. In 1990, she published her first novel, the bildungsroman Screens Against the Sky.

She taught at St John's College and then at the Universities of Exeter, Leeds, and Nottingham Trent before her appointment as Hildred Carlile Professor of Literature in English at Royal Holloway, University of London. Since 2007, she has held the Professorship of World Literature in English at the University of Oxford.

In 2019, she was elected a Fellow of the Royal Society of Literature, and in the same year a Fellow of the Royal Historical Society. In April 2022 she became an Honorary Fellow of St John's College, Oxford and in November 2022, she was nominated to de Maatschappij der Nederlandse Letterkunde (Dutch Society of Letters). She was elected a Corresponding Fellow of the Australian Academy of the Humanities in 2025.

Boehmer is married, and has two sons.

== Postcolonial criticism and theory ==
Boehmer's work has been seen as foundational to the fields of colonial and postcolonial studies, British colonial history, and understandings of nation, narration and gender. Her approach is notable for how she explores postcolonial questions of home, belonging, migration and translation through the modes both of literary criticism and creative writing.

In her first book, Colonial and Postcolonial Literature: Migrant Metaphors (1995, 2nd edn 2005), Boehmer provides a radically historicising survey of global anglophone literary production from the 1830s, the period of the so-called second empire, to the present, and critically examines key arguments, terms, and problems in anti-colonial thought and postcolonial theory. Her central argument is that rather than simply being a reflection of social and political reality, literature is actively engaged in processes of colonisation, decolonisation, and post-independence national identity formation, all, in many respects, “textual undertaking[s]". After tracing the textual construction of empire through a series of close literary readings of popular genres (such as the missionary and explorer travelogue, the adventure romance, the imperial Gothic tale, and the Victorian “domestic” novel) and writers (including Joseph Conrad, Rudyard Kipling, Olive Schreiner, D. H. Lawrence, Virginia Woolf, and T. S. Eliot), she then explores how writers such as Chinua Achebe, Wilson Harris, Jamaica Kincaid, Ben Okri, and Ngũgĩ wa Thiong'o have navigated the dialectic of colonial history and post-independence nationalism through their attention to questions of lost cultural heritage, fragmented memory, hybridity, and language. She closes by turning to contemporary women's, indigenous, and migrant postcolonial literatures, and makes the crucial argument that, despite criticisms of such writing for being oriented towards Western markets, "the audacious crossing of different perspectives in post-imperial writing can work as an anti-colonial strategy". Thus articulating a middle-ground between "cosmopolitan" and "local" or "context-based" approaches in Postcolonial Studies, Colonial and Postcolonial Literature suggests a fruitful new direction in the field while offering a now canonical overview of its literatures, theories, and histories.

In her second book, Empire, the National and the Postcolonial, 1890–1920: Resistance in Interaction (2002), Boehmer builds on the historicising and textual approach developed in her first. There, she narrows down her historical focus to 1890–1920, and explores the "interdiscursive" and "intertextual" links between various anti-colonial, nationalist, and modernist groups of the period. Her individual case studies include Irish support for the Boers in South Africa, the partnership of the Irishwoman Sister Nivedita and the Bengali spiritual guru Aurobindo Ghose, Sol Plaatje's conflicted South African nationalism, and the cross-border, cosmopolitan involvements of W. B. Yeats, Rabindranath Tagore, and Leonard Woolf. Thus aiming to swivel the conventional postcolonial axis of coloniser and colonised "laterally" by examining "the 'contact zone' of cultural and political exchange […] between peripheries", this book has contributed substantially to the "swiveling" of Postcolonial Studies towards its current emphasis on "minor transnationalism" (Shu-mei Shih, Francoise Lionnet), "peripheral modernities" (Neil Lazarus), and other related areas. The postcolonial critic Stephen Slemon has hailed the book as "a brilliant analysis of lateral cross-culturalism in the moment of high modernism", adding that the book "changes our understanding of imperial dialectics" and that "The map of postcolonial resistance theory will have to be redrawn".

Stories of Women: Gender and Narrative in the Postcolonial Nation (2005), Boehmer's third monograph, seeks to intervene in current postcolonial discourses that treat gender as “subsidiary to the category of race”. Boehmer contends that gendered, especially patriarchal, forms have been habitually invoked “to imagine postcolonial nations into being”, and that “constructions of the nation in fiction and other discourses are differentially marked by masculine and feminine systems of value”. Focusing on Africa and South Asia, and critically engaging with theorists such as Benedict Anderson, Fredric Jameson, Partha Chatterjee, and Frantz Fanon, she traces such gendered constructions and deconstructions in a range of texts by, among others, Ngũgĩ wa Thiong'o, Chinua Achebe, Ben Okri, Arundhati Roy, Manju Kapur, and Tsitsi Dangarembga. Stories of Women definitively positions the question of gender and its literary embodiments as central to that of postcolonial national identity.

Nelson Mandela: A Very Short Introduction (2008), is a study in political leadership and charisma that pointedly raises the question of why Mandela's story should remain so important to us today. Beyond merely providing a short biography of the South African icon, this Introduction outlines his multiple national and international resonances as “a universal symbol of social justice […], an exemplary figure connoting non-racialism and democracy, [and] a moral giant". Through the figure of Mandela, Boehmer thus draws out a profoundly humanist, ethical vision of a global justice-to-come. An expanded and updated second edition of Nelson Mandela was published on the 10th anniversary of his death in December 2023. In the same year, Boehmer also published The Audacious Experiment, a history of the Mandela Rhodes Foundation, 2003–2023, co-written with its first CEO Shaun Johnson.

Indian Arrivals, 1870–1915: Networks of British Empire (2015) explores the lives of Indian writers, politicians, reformers, evangelists, students and seamen travelling to Britain, in the period between the opening of the Suez Canal and the First World War. It was awarded the European Society for the Study of Literature Prize for Best Book on Literatures in the English Language in 2016. Unlike previous studies, Indian Arrivals focuses especially on the journey (that rite of passage wherein "eastern identity crystallizes yet is in part left behind"); on the shaping influence of Indian migrants on late Victorian cultural life; and on the tentative, asymmetric nature of the British-Indian encounter which, in spite of preconception and misunderstanding, reaches haphazardly towards a state of dialogue. Figures discussed in the book include the lawyer Cornelia Sorabji, as well as reformers and politicians such as B. M. Malabari and Dadabhai Naoroji. But the negotiation of identity through poetry, as performed by Toru Nutt, Sarojini Naidu, Manmohan Ghose, and Rabindranath Tagore is given particular attention. While preparing the manuscript, Boehmer served as Co-Investigator on a four-year research and public education project funded by the Arts and Humanities Research Council, titled “South Asians Making Britain”.

Postcolonial Poetics: 21st-Century Critical Readings (2018) is about contemporary reading practices, and how they shape our understanding of, relationship to, and place in the world. Drawing on a range of postcolonial literatures from southern Africa, West Africa, and Black and Asian Britain, and featuring close readings of novels, poems, essays, and memoirs / autobiographies by prominent contemporary writers, it presents reading as an imaginative, engaged act of border-crossing and empathic identification. Postcolonial literatures, Boehmer argues, are particularly suited to evoking such a response due to their characteristic interest in margins, intersections, subversions, and crossings. In so doing, they not only prompt new consideration of, but also actively draw readers into issues such as resistance, reconciliation, survival after terror, and migration, some of the most urgent of our time.

In addition to her monographs, Boehmer has edited or co-edited several notable volumes of postcolonial literature and criticism. Empire Writing: An Anthology of Colonial Literature 1870–1918 (1998) features a wide-ranging selection of fiction, poetry, travel writing, memoirs, and essays by British, native, and settler writers during the period of high empire. The British best-seller Scouting for Boys (2004) by Robert Baden-Powell, the blueprint for the Boy Scout movement, includes an influential critical introduction by Boehmer as well as her in-depth contextualising notes. J.M. Coetzee in Theory and Context (2009), edited with Robert Eaglestone and Katy Iddiols, comprises critical essays on the 2003 South African Nobel Laureate by a range of leading scholars and novelists. Terror and the Postcolonial (2010), edited with Stephen Morton, seeks, through its array of critical essays, to bring the phenomenon of terrorism into the purview of Postcolonial Studies by assessing literary and cultural representations from the colonial period to the present. The Postcolonial Low Countries: Literature, Colonialism, and Multiculturalism (2012), edited with Sarah de Mul, does the same for Dutch and Belgian post/colonial history and literature, and opens up the new field of neerlandophone Postcolonial Studies. Planned Violence: Post/Colonial Urban Infrastructure, Literature and Culture (2018), edited with Dominic Davies, brings the insights of social geographers and cultural historians into a critical dialogue with literary narratives of urban culture and theories of literary cultural production, and explores new ways of conceptualizing the relationship between urban planning, its often violent effects, and literature.

Boehmer's new monograph, Southern Imagining: A literary history of the far southern hemisphere, will be out from Princeton University Press in 2025. The research on the book was supported by a British Academy/Leverhulme Trust Senior Research Fellowship, 2019–22. Southern Imagining explores how we see the planet through the different tilt and aspect of southern hemisphere skies, seas and geology, drawing upon literary readings from the Portuguese Renaissance poet Luís de Camões, through Samuel Taylor Coleridge and Mary Shelley, to Indigenous Australian writers such as Jazz Money and Alexis Wright. In the book, as in her other work, Boehmer places literary writing as vital and fundamental to self- and global perception. A related essay collection, Life Writing and the Southern Hemisphere, co-edited with Katherine Collins, bringing together southern life-stories, memoirs and testimonies from across the southern continents, was published in 2024.

Boehmer's body of work has contributed to the fields of imperial history, Global South Studies, and Postcolonial Studies.

== Fiction ==
Boehmer has identified with the term "writer-critic", a phrase originally intended by J. M. Coetzee to marry with equal emphasis his two reciprocal and commutual vocations. Fiction and criticism have occupied her in tandem since 1990, when she entered her first tenured academic post at the University of Leeds two months after publishing her debut novel. Screens Against the Sky is a bildungsroman that registers the scrutiny of nation, and of self, performed by the generation of writers born in the aftermath of the Sharpeville Massacre (1960) and raised in the time of the Soweto Riots (1976), with Black Consciousness thought ascendant. The epigraphs to the novel are, significantly, from Doris Lessing and Steve Biko. It is the story of a young woman who constructs her social identity through story, diary, and recalcitrance. Like the protagonist of Nadine Gordimer's Burger's Daughter (1979), she also aims to uphold her political commitments while seeking personal fulfilment as a medical volunteer. Among its many reviews, Screens Against the Sky has been described as "An astonishing debut […] swift, deft […] expertly told" (The Sunday Times), "A brilliant handling of an obsessional mother-daughter relationship" (The Financial Times), and "A beautifully authentic insight into a society turned in on itself in the face of black deprivation" (Wendy Woods). The novel was shortlisted for the David Higham Prize in 1991.

The politics of gender and race also concern Boehmer's second novel, An Immaculate Figure (1993). The model heroine Rosandra White, the immaculate white figure of the title, is viewed and used as a blank slate upon which a series of male admirers, an 'uncle', an international arms trader, and a revolutionary, seek to inscribe their interests and desires. As with Screens Against the Sky, An Immaculate Figure was well received by critics and audiences, being described as "a very clever book indeed" (The Guardian) and a novel of "remarkable restraint and subtlety" (West Africa).

Bloodlines (1997), Boehmer's third novel, opens a dialogue between contemporary South Africa and an episode in its colonial history, to explore the theme of truth and reconciliation. The novel follows a journalist Andrea Hardy whose partner dies in a Durban bomb blast, interleaving her bereft search for truth with an epistolary story drawn from involvement of Irish nationalists on the Afrikaner side at the siege of Ladysmith (1899–1900). Her investigation leads her first to the bomber's mother and then into his family's "Coloured" ancestry—a genealogy on which, however, the two women retain separate narratorial perspectives. The novel, described by J. M. Coetzee as "an engrossing and intriguingly told chapter in anti-imperial history", was supported by an Arts Council Writer's Award, and was shortlisted for the Sanlam Prize.

People of mixed racial heritage are defined in Bloodlines in terms of their interrogatory relationship to the past. They “know history isn't straight”, a meandering motif which is reprised archaeologically in the riverine locale of Boehmer's fourth novel. Nile Baby (2008) is a story of migrancy grounded within a carefully drawn English suburban pastoral, where the unearthing of a Nubian skeleton in a Roman grave testifies to the ancient but unacknowledged legacy of Africans in Europe. The narrative revolves around two children who “liberate” a century-old foetus preserved in the specimen collection of their school laboratory. Sensing that they have stirred a ghost, they embark on "a strange and often unsettling odyssey across England" (The Times Literary Supplement) in search of its rightful resting-place. During their journey they are helped by a series of adults who each (although its true origin is never confirmed) identify the baby as African, and who invest its fate with their own stories. Boehmer has described the novel as a dialogue not only with two of the writers most important to her, Joseph Conrad and Chinua Achebe, but also with the women who gave interviews to her on miscarriage. The novel, extensively and positively reviewed, has been taught in English schools.

Boehmer's characteristic fluency in interweaving the personal with the political also undergirds her fifth and most recent novel, The Shouting in the Dark (2015), which won the Olive Schreiner Prize in 2019 and was long-listed for the Sunday Times Barry Ronge prize. Like Screens Against the Sky and Bloodlines, the novel traces a young woman's trajectory of redemptive self-discovery against the violence of both the family and the nation. Set in and near Durban during the 1970s, the narrative revolves around the protagonist's relationships with her abusive father and her neurotic, ineffectual mother. The title derives from a crucial, early scene in which the former is glimpsed shouting obscenities into the night sky:

In Braemar, once night falls, strange wild cries leap from the father's mouth. Swaddled in a scarf of Rothman's Plain smoke, he sits on the verandah as if keeping watch, a tumbler of brown liquid on the rattan table beside him. The words he once spoke to the starry sky in his ordinary voice, back on the porch in Durban, now come out as shouts, raw noises that tear at his smoker's lungs. 'Idioot,' he shouts, ‘Klootzak! Keep on, now, keep on!' The mother leaves him to it. After dinner she goes straight to their bedroom, tugs the door closed behind her with a click.

As she matures into a young woman, Ella must navigate both physical violence and the weight of wartime memory, Dutch heritage, European colonial history, and the racial ideology it carries in order to forge her own independent identity and subjectivity. Reminiscent of the story of John in J. M. Coetzee's Boyhood, Ella's story is of resilience in the face of oppression, one that charts the growth of a creative, political, and profoundly human consciousness. Coetzee himself has described The Shouting in the Dark as a "story, as disturbing as it is enthralling, of a girl's struggle to emerge from under the dead weight of her father's oppression while at the same time searching for a secure footing in the moral chaos of South Africa of the apartheid era". As Ashley Davis concludes in her review for The Scotsman, The Shouting in the Dark is a “dense, disturbing but ultimately optimistic book”. A new, Australian edition of the novel was brought out by UWA Publishing in February 2019, and a translation into Dutch, Op de veranda, in 2015 (Cossee). Chinese translations of Bloodlines and Nile Baby appeared in 2024.

Summarizing the significance of her literary output, the noted postcolonial critic Simon Gikandi has argued that Boehmer's novels

are often about heroines trapped in their privileged worlds and closed off from the larger political world around them. These novels are driven by a powerful rhetoric of failure and their characters struggle with the limits set by a world they find difficult to name or transcend, yet one that they cannot identify with. In her novels, as in her academic work in postcolonial literature, Boehmer constantly works to overcome the culture of guilt that has been associated with liberal white South African writers and to think through the possibility of making black consciousness itself a part of white writing. While her novels are often about the enclosures of a privileged white culture, their characters strive to define themselves against the political movements associated with Steve Biko and the black consciousness movement of the 1970s.

Terence Cave argues that the "strikingly original structure" of Boehmer's fiction creates a "slow-burn effect" for the reader through which emotional and political truths steadily unfold.

In 2010, Boehmer published a collection of short stories, Sharmilla, and Other Portraits. The collection has been translated into Italian and in part into Dutch. A second collection entitled To the Volcano, and other stories appeared from Myriad Editions in 2019. Anjali Joseph in the TLS saw the "memorably lifelike" stories as reminiscent of Jean Rhys's fiction. J. M. Coetzee hailed their "passion and intelligence". "Supermarket Love", which appears in the second volume, was commended for the Australian Book Review's Elizabeth Jolley Short Story Prize.

== Other professional activities ==
Boehmer is Professorial Governing Body Fellow at Wolfson College, Oxford. She teaches postcolonial literature and theory at the Faculty of English Language and Literature, Oxford; supervises Masters and doctoral students there; convenes, with Professors Ankhi Mukherjee and Pablo Mukherjee, the Oxford Postcolonial and World Literature Seminar; is on the editorial boards of Interventions: International Journal of Postcolonial Studies, the Journal of Postcolonial Writing, and other journals; and is General Editor of Oxford University Press's series "Oxford Studies in Postcolonial Literatures".

Boehmer took over the role of Director of the Oxford Centre for Life-Writing from Professor Dame Hermione Lee in 2017 and is now the Executive Director. Founded in 2011 at Wolfson College, the Centre is an international hub for work on life-writing, and offers a variety of Visiting Scholarships, Doctoral Studentships, and Research Fellowships. There, Boehmer convenes and co-organises talks and workshops related to the practice of and research into the genre, especially with reference to the Global South.

Boehmer was Principal Investigator of the John Fell-funded "Postcolonial Writers Make Worlds" project, which explored the question of how we read Black British and British Asian writing. The related website, Writers Make Worlds, features the work of leading British writers. She is also co-convener of Oxford's TORCH-funded "Race and Resistance in the Long Nineteenth Century" network. In 2014–16, she was a recipient of the Leverhulme International Network Grant for the network Planned Violence: Post/colonial Urban Infrastructures and Literature. The essay collection Planned Violence came out with Palgrave Macmillan in 2018, co-edited with Dominic Davies.

Boehmer is a trustee of the Charlie Perkins Scholarships, an Australian-British organisation established in 2010, named after activist Charlie Perkins, which funds the postgraduate study of Aboriginal Australian students at Oxford and Cambridge. Since 2016, she is also a Rhodes Trustee.

She was the founding chair, in 1988, of Rhodes Scholars Against Apartheid, and, in the same year, co-established, with Kumi Naidoo, the Bram Fischer Memorial Lecture series.

In March 2009, Boehmer gave the M.M. Bhattacharya endowment lectures at the University of Calcutta, Kolkata. In 2014–15, she served as a judge for the Man Booker International Prize. In 2015–17, she was Director of The Oxford Research Centre in the Humanities (TORCH), and is now Principal Investigator on the Mellon-funded "Humanities and Identities" project at TORCH. She was the Humanities lead on the UKRI GCRF-funded "Accelerating Achievement for Africa's Adolescents" project, based at the Universities of Oxford and Cape Town, 2019–23. She published several highly-cited articles on narrative-based intervention rising from the workshops that she led.

Since 2016, she has continuously held a research attachment at the J. M. Coetzee Centre for Creative Practice at the University of Adelaide, and was an international visitor at the university in 2024.

== Selected publications ==
=== Monographs ===
- Colonial and Postcolonial Literature: Migrant Metaphors. Oxford: Oxford University Press (1995, 2nd edn 2005)
- Empire, the National and the Postcolonial, 1890–1920: Resistance in Interaction. Oxford: Oxford University Press (2002)
- Stories of Women: Gender and Narrative in the Postcolonial Nation. Manchester: Manchester University Press (2005)
- Nelson Mandela: A Very Short Introduction. Oxford: Oxford University Press (2008)
- Indian Arrivals, 1870–1915: Networks of British Empire. Oxford: Oxford University Press (2015)
- Postcolonial Poetics: 21st-Century Critical Readings. London: Palgrave Macmillan (2018)

=== Edited volumes ===
- Empire Writing: An Anthology of Colonial Literature 1870–1918. Oxford: Oxford University Press (1998)
- Scouting for Boys, Robert Baden-Powell. Oxford: Oxford University Press (2004), second edition (2018)
- J.M. Coetzee in Context and Theory (with Robert Eaglestone and Katy Iddiols). London: Continuum (2009)
- Terror and the Postcolonial (with Stephen Morton). Malden, MA: Wiley-Blackwell (2010) ISBN 978-1-4051-9154-8
- The Postcolonial Low Countries: Literature, Colonialism, and Multiculturalism (with Sarah de Mul). Lanham, MD: Lexington Books (2012)
- Planned Violence: Post/Colonial Urban Infrastructure, Literature and Culture (with Dominic Davies). London: Palgrave Macmillan (2018)
- Life Writing and the Southern Hemisphere (with Katherine Collins). London: Bloomsbury (2024)

=== Novels and short stories ===
- Screens Against The Sky. London: Bloomsbury (1990)
- An Immaculate Figure. London: Bloomsbury (1993)
- Bloodlines. Cape Town: David Philip Publishers (1997)
- Nile Baby. Banbury: Ayebia Clarke (2008)
- Sharmilla, and Other Portraits. Johannesburg: Jacana (2010)
- The Shouting in the Dark. Dingwall: Inverness: Sandstone Press (2015)
- To the Volcano, and other stories. Brighton: Myriad Editions (2019)
