= Bob Tulloch =

British portrait painter (born 1950)

Bob Tulloch (born 1950) is a British portrait painter whose portraits hang in the National Portrait Gallery in London, several colleges of the University of Oxford, and elsewhere. He was educated in London, at Ruskin School of Drawing and Fine Art in Oxford, and at the Royal Academy Schools, London.

Tulloch's portraits include Dame Muriel Spark (National Portrait Gallery), heads of Oxford colleges such as Ruth Deech (St Anne's College) and Michael Beloff QC (Trinity College), and others. His 1999 portrait of the poet Ted Hughes is held by the Royal Collection Trust. Portraits by Tulloch at Rhodes House, Oxford, include Lord Waldegrave of North Hill and former Wardens, Sir Colin Lucas and Dr. Donald Markwell. Portraits of other prominent scholars include the political philosopher Larry Siedentop (Keble College) and the professor of English literature and reviewer John Carey.
