= Robin Fletcher =

British field hockey player

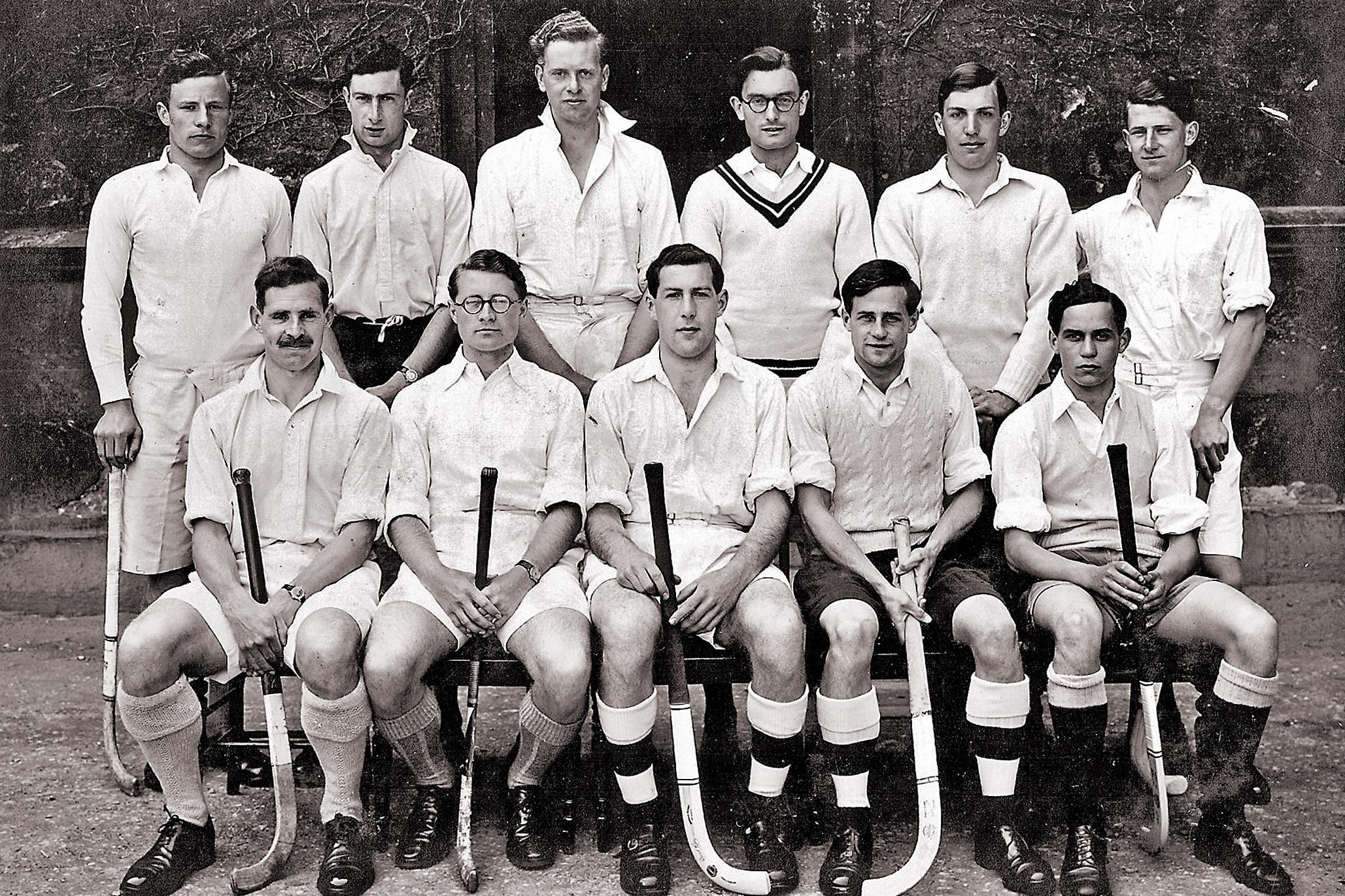

Personal information
- Born: 30 May 1922 Guildford, England
- Died: 15 January 2016 (aged 93)

Sport
- Sport: Field hockey
- Position: Forward
Senior career
Years	Team	Caps	Goals
1947–1952	Oxford University	-	-
1952–1954	City of Oxford	-	-
National team
Years	Team	Caps	Goals
–	Great Britain		-
–	England		-
Medal record
Men's field hockey
Representing Great Britain
Bronze medal – third place	1952 Helsinki	Team competition

Robin Anthony Fletcher OBE DSC (30 May 1922 – 15 January 2016) was a British academic administrator, and a British field hockey player who competed in the 1952 Summer Olympics. He was a member of the British field hockey team which won the bronze medal.

== Biography ==
Fletcher represented Great Britain in the field hockey tournament at the 1952 Olympic Games in Helsinki. He played all three matches as a forward.

He initially played his club hockey for Oxford University before playing for the City of Oxford Hockey Club. He also played for Somerset at county level. He later became involved with the management of the British team.

Fletcher was a scholar of modern Greek and a Fellow of Trinity College, Oxford, from 1950 to 1989, and later became an emeritus Fellow. Between 1951 and 1974 he combined the position of Domestic Bursar with a university lectureship in modern Greek. From 1980 to 1989 he served as Warden of Rhodes House, Oxford, responsible for the running of the Rhodes Scholarship. His memoirs, A Favouring Wind: A passage within and without academia, were published in 2007. His wife Jinny died in July 2010. Portraits of Fletcher hang in Rhodes House, Oxford, and Trinity College, Oxford.

Academic offices
Preceded by Sir Edgar Williams	Warden of Rhodes House, Oxford; 1980–1989	Succeeded by Sir Anthony Kenny
