= Edgar Williams =

British Army military intelligence officer

- Born: Edgar Trevor Williams; 20 November 1912; Chatham, Kent, England
- Died: 26 June 1995 (aged 82); Oxford, England
- Relatives: Philip Robertson (father in law)
- Military career
- Allegiance: United Kingdom
- Branch: British Army
- Service years: 1939–1945
- Rank: Brigadier
- Nickname: Bill
- Service number: 92594
- Unit: 1st King's Dragoon Guards
- Conflicts: Second World War
- Awards: Companion of the Order of the Bath; Commander of the Order of the British Empire; Distinguished Service Order; Mentioned in dispatches (3)
- Other work: Warden of Rhodes House, Oxford

Brigadier Sir Edgar Trevor Williams CB CBE DSO DL (20 November 1912 – 26 June 1995) was a British historian and army military intelligence officer who played a significant role in the Second Battle of El Alamein in the Second World War. He was one of the few officers who was privy to the Ultra secret, and he served on the staff of Field Marshal Sir Bernard Montgomery as his intelligence officer for the rest of the war.

A graduate of Merton College, Oxford, where he obtained a First in modern history in 1934, Williams was commissioned as a second lieutenant in the 1st King's Dragoon Guards in June 1939. In February 1941, the troop he was commanding was the first British unit to encounter the German Afrika Korps. He was recruited to work in military intelligence by Brigadier Francis de Guingand, who later became Montgomery's chief of staff. As an historian, Williams was accustomed to integrating different sources of information to build up a larger picture. He integrated information from Ultra with that from other sources such as the Y service, prisoner of war interrogations, aerial reconnaissance and ground reconnaissance behind enemy lines by the Long Range Desert Group.

After the war, Williams became a Fellow of Balliol College, Oxford; the Warden of Rhodes House, Oxford; and editor of the Dictionary of National Biography. As secretary to the Rhodes Trustees, he was concerned with the selection and subsequent well-being of nearly two hundred Rhodes scholars each year.

== Early life ==
Edgar Trevor Williams was born in Chatham, Kent, on 20 November 1912, the second of the three children and oldest son of (Joseph) Edgar Williams, a clergyman, and his wife, Anne Ethel née Evans. His father served as a chaplain in the Royal Navy during the Great War, and served on the Western Front. After the war the family moved to Wolverhampton. Trevor (known to his friends as "Bill") was educated at Tettenhall College, Staffordshire, and then at King Edward VII School in Sheffield after his father was posted there in 1928. He secured a postmastership at Merton College, Oxford, where he played soccer and cricket, and obtained a First in modern history in 1934.

Williams remained at Merton as a Harmsworth senior scholar, then became an assistant lecturer at the Liverpool University in 1936. He returned to Merton in 1937 as a junior research fellow, studying the Cabinet of the United Kingdom in the 18th century. He earned a Master of Arts degree in 1938, and commenced work on his PhD, in which he argued that it was the Treaty of Waitangi that granted Britain sovereignty over New Zealand, and the land was not terra nullius. Today his argument is universally accepted. In 1938 Williams married Monica Robertson, the daughter of Philip Robertson, a professor from New Zealand. They had one child, a daughter, and divorced in 1945.

== Second World War ==
=== North Africa ===
Williams was commissioned as a second lieutenant in the 1st King's Dragoon Guards on 21 June 1939. After the Second World War broke out in September 1939, his unit became an armoured car regiment in the 2nd Armoured Division. The division was sent to Cyrenaica, where, on 24 February 1941, Williams was in command of a troop of C Squadron, 1st King's Dragoon Guards when it was ambushed near El Agheila. It became the first British unit to encounter the German Afrika Korps (DAK).

The desert sun affected his already weak eyes, so he was sent to recuperate in Cairo, where he was posted to General Headquarters (GHQ) Middle East Command in which Brigadier Francis de Guingand became Director of Military Intelligence (DMI) in February 1942. The appointment of de Guingand, an officer with no experience in intelligence, said much about the state of intelligence in the British Army at the time, where it was assumed that staff college training and a good brain were all that was required. Aware of his lack of expertise, de Guingand selected Williams and James Oliver Ewart to serve on his staff. According to de Guingand: "Ewart and Williams were an ideal combination. They understood each other perfectly. Both had first-class brains, both were university dons, and hated soldiering as a profession!" When de Guingand was appointed Brigadier General Staff of the Eighth Army in August 1942, he arranged for Williams to be transferred to Eighth Army headquarters as a GSO2.

While working at GHQ, Williams had been indoctrinated into the Ultra secret. Knowledge of this was highly restricted; the Eighth Army commander was shown the original text, but not the corps commanders, who were only given summaries with no indication of the source of the information. The quality of the information coming from Ultra was very high, but over-reliance on it could be very dangerous, both militarily, when Erwin Rommel and the DAK did not act as expected, and professionally, when the DMI was fired for failing to forecast this. Williams's academic training came to the fore; as an historian, he was accustomed to integrating different sources of information to build up a larger picture. Information coming from Ultra was integrated with that from other sources such as the Y service, prisoner of war interrogations, aerial reconnaissance and ground reconnaissance behind enemy lines by the Long Range Desert Group. Williams and his staff would attempt to provide an assessment and then use Ultra to verify it. He would prepare his intelligence summaries in the early hours of the morning by the light of a pressure lamp, wearing a crochet jacket that had once belonged to a German general.

When Lieutenant-General Bernard Montgomery assumed command of the Eighth Army in August 1942, he was impressed with Williams and identified him as the man he wanted to head his intelligence section. For the Battle of Alam Halfa, Ultra provided information on German intentions that was accurate in every detail except for a two-day delay caused by a shortage of petrol. In his memoirs Montgomery recalled how Williams pointed out a crucial weakness in Generalfeldmarschall Erwin Rommel's deployment of his troops, in that they were arranged in a manner that Williams described as "corsetted", with German troops between and behind the Italians. Williams suggested that if the two could be separated, then it might be possible to break through the Italian forces. Montgomery exploited this in the Second Battle of El Alamein.

Williams later explained the difficulty of dealing with intelligence during the German and Italian withdrawal after the battle:

Rommel of course had to suggest that he was going to hang on to the last moment because of Hitler; one therefore had to inform Monty that Rommel's intention—expressed intention—was to stay put here.

The trouble was that while we were helped enormously by Ultra—because Ultra expressed Rommel's intentions to the all-highest—we were sometimes hindered by Ultra, because Rommel was too good a soldier to carry the intentions out... I think we probably asked Monty to lay on too many preparations—which was in any case his natural inclination—because we could see Rommel was told to stay put: "Here it is in Ultra".

The source material was too good. If one had just done one's thinking and intelligence without the signals intelligence, one would have said: "Well, Rommel will get us as far as this—and then he'll be off. And we'll be left sort of dangling once again..."

I think that all that time during that campaign you have two elements about the withdrawal: the "hold to the last ditch" Hitler stuff, and Rommel's very astute generalship, so that you could bet your bottom dollar—although you couldn't bet your bottom dollar because that's exactly what you couldn't do with Rommel—you could take a sly bet that if Rommel was telling Hitler that he was doing a holding to the last drop of blood, that he was in the process of doing a very calculated false front to us.

=== North West Europe ===
Williams remained with Montgomery as his intelligence officer for the rest of the war. When Montgomery departed the Eighth Army in December 1944 to assume command of the 21st Army Group in Operation Overlord, the Allied invasion of Normandy, he took his key officers with him. These included de Guingand, his chief of staff; Brigadier Miles Graham, his Chief Administrative Officer; Brigadier George Richards, his armoured officer; and Williams, who was promoted to brigadier. It was not the normal practice in the British Army for generals to take staff with them from one assignment to the next, but Montgomery judged correctly that his fame as the victor of the Battle of El Alamein would overcome any objections.

For Operation Overlord, Williams confronted the formidable task of providing estimates months in advance of a volatile situation. The G-2 (chief intelligence officer) at Supreme Headquarters Allied Expeditionary Force (SHAEF) was Major-General John Whiteley, de Guingand's predecessor as Brigadier General Staff of the Eighth Army. Although Whiteley was senior to Williams, he had no experience as a chief intelligence officer, and Montgomery placed his faith in Williams. The two agreed to cooperate. Williams told Whiteley:

I do not want to be preaching a doctrine contrary to yours, for I feel there is real value in an agreed text. If we are to be wrong, let's all be wrong together. At least then our commanders would not have had muddled counsel. You will remember the loss of confidence in the Middle East caused by the internecine but public disputes between the "I" people which helped nobody, least of all the disputants.

In the end, Williams performed very well. His estimates were better than those of any other analyst. He slightly underestimated German capabilities, but correctly predicted the strength of German infantry and armoured divisions. This was no small feat in February, four months before the actual attack. As it was, the delay in the date of the attack from May to June allowed the Germans to increase the forces in the area during that time. By 5 June, Williams had assembled a remarkably accurate picture of the German forces. This was too late to be of use on 6 June, but it would be very useful to Montgomery on subsequent days.

Williams was mentioned in despatches three times, and was awarded the Distinguished Service Order on 1 June 1943, appointed a Commander of the Order of the British Empire on 29 June 1944, and made a Companion of the Order of the Bath on 24 January 1946.

== Later life ==
Williams was elected a Fellow of Balliol College, Oxford in 1945, but he never completed his work on the 18th century British cabinet. In 1946, he married Gillian, younger daughter of Major-General Michael Gambier-Parry; they had a son and a daughter. From 1949 to 1980 he was joint editor (with Helen Palmer and later with Christine Nicholls) of the decennial supplements to the Dictionary of National Biography. He only wrote three of its articles, on Winston Churchill, Lord Montgomery and Carton de Wiart. He went on to become warden of Rhodes House in 1952, a position which he held until 1980. As secretary to the Rhodes Trustees from 1959, he was also concerned with the selection and subsequent well-being of nearly two hundred Rhodes scholars per annum (one of whom was Bill Clinton). He relinquished his reserve commission on 20 November 1962, having reached the mandatory retirement age, but retained his rank of brigadier.

At Oxford, Williams was a member of the Hebdomadal Council, a Curator of the Chest (or finance committee), and latterly a Pro-Vice-Chancellor. He also served as a Radcliffe Trustee, as a member of the Nuffield Provincial Hospitals Trust, and as chairman of the Academic Advisory Board which planned Warwick University. He loved cricket, and served for many years as senior treasurer (and in 1966 to 1968 as president) of the Oxford University Cricket Club. He was appointed a Deputy Lieutenant for Oxfordshire in 1964, and was knighted in the 1973 New Year Honours.

Williams worked for the United Nations Security Council Secretariat in New York from 1946 to 1947. In 1959 he was a member of the Devlin Commission on Nyasaland, and he was an observer at the 1980 Southern Rhodesian general election.

Williams died at Oxford on 26 June 1995. His papers relating to his service with the United Nations are in the Bodleian Library at Oxford University; those relating to his correspondence with Montgomery are in the Imperial War Museum.

== Notes ==
Academic offices
| Preceded by Sir Carleton Allen | Warden of Rhodes House, Oxford; 1952–1980 | Succeeded by Robin Fletcher |
