= Anthony Kenny =

British philosopher (1931–2026)

Sir Anthony Kenny FBA
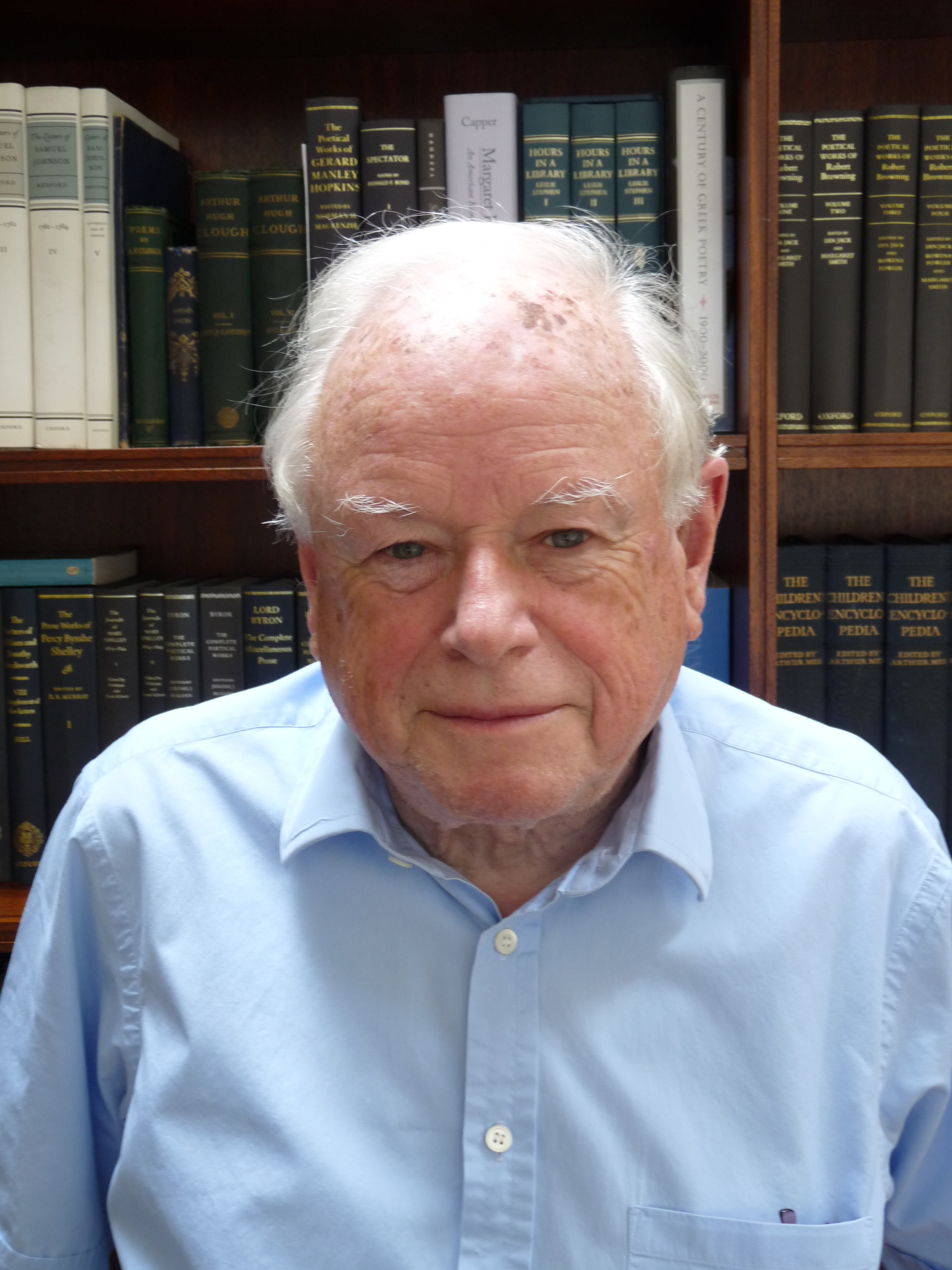
- Kenny in 2010
- Born: Anthony John Patrick Kenny; 16 March 1931; Liverpool, Lancashire, England
- Died: 3 August 2026 (aged 95)

Education
- Education: Venerable English College (STL); St Benet's Hall, Oxford (DPhil)
- Academic advisor: Elizabeth Anscombe

Philosophical work
- Era: Contemporary philosophy
- Region: Western philosophy
- School: Analytical Thomism
- Institutions: University of Oxford
- Doctoral students: John Cottingham
- Main interests: Philosophy of religion, philosophy of mind, history of philosophy
- Notable ideas: Criticism of Cartesian dualism

Ecclesiastical career
- Religion: Catholicism
- Church: Roman Catholic Church
- Ordained: 1955
- Laicized: 1963

Sir Anthony John Patrick Kenny (16 March 1931 – 3 August 2026) was a British philosopher whose interests lay in the philosophy of mind, ancient and scholastic philosophy, the philosophy of religion, and the philosophy of Wittgenstein of whose literary estate he was an executor. With Peter Geach, he made a significant contribution to analytical Thomism, a movement whose aim is to present the thought of St. Thomas Aquinas in the style of analytic philosophy. He was a president of the British Academy and the Royal Institute of Philosophy.

== Education and early career ==
Kenny was born in Liverpool on 16 March 1931, the son of John and Margaret (Jones) Kenny.

He initially trained as a Roman Catholic priest at the Venerable English College, Rome, where he received a degree of Licentiate of Sacred Theology (STL) degree. He was ordained in 1955 and served as a curate in Liverpool (1959–1963).

Having received his DPhil from the University of Oxford (St Benet's Hall) in 1961, he also worked as an assistant lecturer at the University of Liverpool (1961–63). However, he questioned the validity of Roman Catholic doctrine and had been an agnostic since the late 1960s. He was returned to the lay state in 1963, but according to canon law his priestly ordination remained valid. He was never released from his obligation of clerical celibacy and was therefore excommunicated on his marriage in 1965 to Nancy Gayley with whom he had two sons, Charles and Robert.

== Academic career ==
During 1963–1964, Kenny was a lecturer in philosophy at Exeter and Trinity Colleges, Oxford, and he served as University Lecturer 1965–1978. From 1964 until 1978, he was a Fellow of Balliol College, Oxford and Senior Tutor during the periods 1971–1972 and 1976–1978. He was Master of Balliol from 1978 to 1989 and subsequently an Honorary Fellow. During the period 1989–1999, he was both Warden of Rhodes House (manager of the Rhodes Scholarship programme) and Professorial Fellow of St John's College and thereafter Fellow Emeritus. He was Pro-Vice-Chancellor of the University of Oxford from 1984 to 2001 (Pro-Vice-Chancellor for Development, 1999–2001). He retired in 2001.

Within the university, Kenny was Wilde Lecturer in Natural and Comparative Religion (1969–1972), Speaker's Lecturer in Biblical Studies (1980–1983), a member of the Hebdomadal Council (1981–1993), Vice-chairman of the Libraries Board (1985–1988), Curator of the Bodleian Library (1985–1988) and a Delegate, and member of the Finance Committee, of Oxford University Press (1986–1993). From 1972 until 1973 he was the editor of The Oxford Magazine. He received the degree of DLitt in 1980 and the honorary degree of DCL. in 1987.

Kenny was a member of the Board of the British Library 1991–1996 and Chairman 1993–1996, and has served as Chairman of the Society for Protection of Science and Learning (1989–93), of the British National Corpus Advisory Board (1990–1995), of the British Irish Association (1990–1994), and of the Board of the Warburg Institute (1996–2000). He was elected a Fellow of the British Academy in 1974 and served as a member of the Council of the Academy 1985–1988, as Vice President 1986–1988 and President 1989–1993.

He was Gifford Lecturer at the University of Edinburgh 1972–1973 and at the University of Glasgow in 1988, Stanton Lecturer at the University of Cambridge 1980–1983, and Bampton Lecturer at Columbia University in 1983. He was a visiting professor at University of Chicago, Washington University in St. Louis, University of Michigan, University of Minnesota, Cornell University, Stanford University and Rockefeller University.

Kenny had been a member of the American Philosophical Society since 1993, and of the Norwegian Academy of Science and Letters since 1993, and an Honorary Fellow of Harris Manchester College, Oxford since 1996, and of the School of Advanced Study, University of London since 2002 (Senior Distinguished Fellow 2002–2003). He had received the honorary degrees of D.Litt. from Bristol (1982), Liverpool (1988), Glasgow (1990), Trinity College, Dublin (1992), Hull (1993), Sheffield (1995), and Warwick (1995), of D.Hum.Litt. from Denison University, Ohio (1986) and Lafayette College, Pennsylvania (1990) and of D.C.L. from the Queen's University of Belfast (1994).

He translated into English Ludwig Wittgenstein's Philosophical Grammar, published in 1974.

== Philosophical work ==
Although deeply interested in traditional Catholic teaching and continuing to take limited participation in the Catholic Mass, Kenny explicitly defined himself as an agnostic, explaining in the third chapter of his What I Believe (2006) both why he was not a theist and why he was not an atheist:

Many different definitions may be offered of the word "God". Given this fact, atheism makes a much stronger claim than theism does. The atheist says that no matter what definition you choose, "God exists" is always false. The theist only claims that there is some definition which will make "God exists" true. In my view, neither the stronger nor the weaker claim has been convincingly established.

He goes on: "the true default position is neither theism nor atheism, but agnosticism ... a claim to knowledge needs to be substantiated; ignorance need only be confessed."

That (as Kenny puts it) "there is no such being as the God of traditional natural theology: the concept of God propounded by scholastic theologians and rationalistic philosophers is an incoherent one" is, according to William Hasker, the "most important conclusion" of Kenny's "essay in natural theology" The God of the Philosophers (1979). Hasker notes, however, that (in the book's final chapter) Kenny "considers seriously the possible existence of a God who, while differing somewhat in his attributes from the God of traditional natural theology, could still be identified with the saving God of theistic faith".

Hasker further notes that Kenny "concludes by suggesting that one who is in doubt about God may rationally pray for enlightenment about his existence and nature". As Kenny asserts: "It surely is no more unreasonable than the act of a man adrift in the ocean, trapped in a cave, or stranded on a mountainside, who cries for help though he may never be heard or fires a signal which may never be seen." And if there is such a God, then such prayer "cannot be less pleasing to him than the attitude of a man who takes no interest in a question so important, or in a question so difficult would not welcome assistance beyond human powers".

Kenny wrote extensively on Thomas Aquinas and modern Thomism. In The Five Ways (1969), he deals with St. Thomas' five proofs of God. In it, he argues that none of the proofs Thomas sets out is wholly valid, and instead sets out to show the flaws in the five ways. His arguments range from the problem of Aristotelian motion in a modern scientific context, to the ability of contingent beings to cause eternality in other contingent beings. His objections all focus on a modern interpretation of St. Thomas.

He candidly described the predicament of the beginning of the universe, which both atheists and agnostics face, writing, "According to the Big Bang Theory, the whole matter of the universe began at a particular time in the remote past. A proponent of such a theory, at least if he is an atheist, must believe that the matter of the universe came from nothing and by nothing."

In What Is Faith? (1992), Kenny addresses "the question of whether belief in God, and faith in a divine world, is a reasonable or rational state of mind." He criticises the idea, "common to theists like Aquinas and Descartes and to an atheist like Russell," that "Rational belief [is] either self-evident or based directly or indirectly on what is evident", which he terms "foundationalism" following Plantinga, arguing that foundationalism is a self-refuting idea.

During the 2000s, Kenny wrote a history of Western philosophy, released in four parts from 2004 to 2007; the four books were released together as A New History of Western Philosophy in 2010.

In Brief Encounters (2018) Kenny says Jacques Derrida was "corrupted by being famous. He gave up philosophy for rhetoric, and rhetoric of a particularly childish kind". Writing of Richard Dawkins, he suggests that "moving from The Extended Phenotype to The God Delusion is like moving from the Financial Times to The Sun." He commends Denis Noble's principle of "Biological Relativity"which states (according to Kenny) that "in biology there is no privileged level of causation: living organisms are multilevel open systems in which the behaviour at any level depends on higher and lower levels".

== Death ==
Kenny died on 3 August 2026, aged 95.

== Honours and awards ==
Kenny was made a Knight Bachelor by Elizabeth II of the United Kingdom in 1992 and had been an Honorary Bencher of Lincoln's Inn since 1999.

In 2006, Kenny was awarded the American Catholic Philosophical Association's Aquinas Medal for significant contributions to philosophy in the Catholic tradition.

Portraits of Kenny hang in the British Academy, London, and at Balliol College and Rhodes House, Oxford.

== Published works ==
- Kenny, A. (1963) Action, Emotion and Will. London: Routledge. ISBN 0-415-30374-5
- Kenny, A. (1963) Responsa Alumnorum of English College, Rome, 2 vols, Catholic Record Society: Records series, vols. 54–55.
- Kenny, A. (1968) Descartes: a study of his philosophy
- Kenny, A. (1969) The Five Ways: St. Thomas Aquinas' Proofs of God's Existence. London: Routledge. ISBN 0-415-31845-9
- (ed.) Kenny, A. (1969) Aquinas: a collection of critical essays. New York: Hill and Wang. ISBN 0-8090-2724-0
  - Kenny, A. (1969) "Introduction" doi:10.1007/978-1-349-15356-5_1
  - Kenny, A. (1969) "Divine foreknowledge and human freedom" doi:10.1007/978-1-349-15356-5_11
  - Kenny, A. (1969) "Intellect and imagination in Aquinas" doi:10.1007/978-1-349-15356-5_12
- Kenny, A., Longuet-Higgins, H. C., Lucas, J. R., Waddington, C. H. (1972), The Nature of Mind. Edinburgh University Press (Gifford Lectures, online) ISBN 0-85224-235-2
- Kenny, A., Longuet-Higgins, H. C., Lucas, J. R., Waddington, C. H. (1973), The Development of Mind. Edinburgh University Press (Gifford Lectures, online) ISBN 0-85224-263-8
- Kenny, A. (1973) Wittgenstein. Harmondsworth: The Penguin Press. ISBN 0-14-021581-6
- Kenny, A. (1974) The Anatomy of the Soul
- Kenny, A. (1975) Will, Freedom and Power
- Kenny, A. (1978) The Aristotelian Ethics: A Study of the Relationship between the Eudemian and Nicomachean Ethics of Aristotle. Oxford: Clarendon Press. ISBN 0-19-824554-8
- Kenny, A. (1978) Freewill and Responsibility. London: Routledge. ISBN 0-7100-8998-8
- Kenny, A. (1979) The God of the Philosophers. Oxford: OUP. ISBN 0-19-824594-7
- Kenny, A. (1980) Aquinas. Oxford; New York: Oxford University Press. ISBN 978-0-19-287501-3
- Kenny, A. (1982) The Computation of Style: An Introduction to Statistics for Students of Literature and Humanities. Oxford & New York: Pergamon Press. ISBN 0-08-024282-0
- Kenny, A. (1983) Thomas More. Oxford: Oxford University Press. ISBN 0-19-287574-4
- Kenny, A. (1983) Faith and Reason. New York: Columbia University Press. ISBN 978-0-231-05488-1
- Kenny, A. (1984) The Legacy of Wittgenstein. Oxford; New York: Blackwell. ISBN 978-0-631-13705-4
- Kenny, A. (1986) A Path from Rome: An Autobiography. Oxford: Oxford University Press. ISBN 0-19-283050-3
- Kenny, A. (1986) A Stylometric Study of the New Testament. Oxford: Oxford University Press. ISBN 978-0-19-826178-0
- Kenny, A. (1987) The Heritage of Wisdom: essays in the history of philosophy ISBN 978-0631152699
- Kenny, A. (1987) Reason and Religion: Essays in Philosophical Theology. Oxford: Blackwell. ISBN 0-631-15268-7
- Kenny, A. (1988) God and Two Poets: Arthur Hugh Clough and Gerard Manley Hopkins. London: Sidgwick & Jackson. ISBN 0-283-99387-1
- Kenny, A. (1989) The Metaphysics of Mind
- (ed.) Kenny, A. (1990) The Oxford Diaries of Arthur Hugh Clough
- Kenny, A. (comp) (1991) Mountains: An Anthology. London: John Murray. ISBN 978-0-7195-4639-6
- Kenny, A. (1992) What Is Faith? Essays in the Philosophy of Religion. Oxford: OUP. ISBN 0-19-283067-8
- Kenny, A. (1993) Aristotle on the Perfect Life. Oxford: Clarendon Press. ISBN 0-19-824017-1
- Kenny, A. (1993) Aquinas on Mind. New York: Routledge. ISBN 0-415-04415-4
- Kenny, A. (ed) (1994) The Oxford History of Western Philosophy. Oxford: Oxford University Press. ISBN 0-19-824278-6
- Kenny, A. (1995) Frege: An Introduction to the Founder of Modern Analytic Philosophy. London: Penguin Philosophy. ISBN 0-14-012550-7
- Kenny, A. (1997) A Brief History of Western Philosophy. Malden, Mass.: Blackwell. ISBN 0-631-20132-7
- Kenny, A. (1997) A Life in Oxford. London: John Murray. ISBN 0-7195-5061-0
- Kenny, A. (2001) Essays on the Aristotelian Tradition
- Kenny, A. (2002) Aquinas on Being. Oxford: Clarendon Press. ISBN 0-19-823847-9
- Kenny, A. (2004) Ancient Philosophy: A New History of Western Philosophy, vol. 1. Oxford: Clarendon Press. ISBN 0-19-875273-3
- Kenny, A. (2005) Arthur Hugh Clough: a poet's life. London & New York: Continuum. ISBN 0-8264-7382-2
- Kenny, A. (2005) Medieval Philosophy: A New History of Western Philosophy, vol. 2 OUP. ISBN 978-0-19-875275-2
- Kenny, A. (2005) The Unknown God: Agnostic Essays Continuum. ISBN 978-0-8264-7634-0
- Kenny, A. (2006) What I Believe. London & New York: Continuum. ISBN 0-8264-8971-0
- Kenny, A. (2006) The Rise of Modern Philosophy: A New History of Western Philosophy, vol. 3 OUP. ISBN 978-0-19-875277-6
- Kenny, A. & Kenny C. (2006) Life, Liberty, and the Pursuit of Utility. Imprint Academic. ISBN 978-1-84540-052-1
- Kenny, A. (2007) Philosophy in the Modern World: A New History of Western Philosophy, vol. 4. OUP. ISBN 978-0-19-875279-0
- Kenny, A. & Kenny R. (2007) Can Oxford be Improved? Imprint Academic. ISBN 978-1-84540-094-1
- Kenny, A. (2010) A New History of Western Philosophy, Oxford University Press. ISBN 978-0-19-958988-3
- Kenny, A. (2017) The Enlightenment: A Very Brief History, SPCK, London ISBN 978-0-28-1076437-
- Kenny, A. (2018) Brief Encounters: Notes from a Philosophers Diary, SPCK, London ISBN 978-0-281-07919-3
- Kenny, A. (2019) Immanuel Kant: A Very Brief History, SPCK, London ISBN 978-0281076543

== Sources ==
- School of Advanced Study, University of London
- About the satirical magazine Why? (archived by Wayback Machine)

Academic offices
Preceded by Christopher Hill	Master of Balliol College, Oxford; 1978–1989	Succeeded by Baruch Samuel Blumberg
Preceded by Robin Fletcher	Warden of Rhodes House, Oxford; 1989–1999	Succeeded by John Rowett
