= Colin Lucas =

British historian

Sir Colin Lucas FRHistS

Vice-Chancellor of the University of Oxford
- In office 11 January 1997 – 5 October 2004
- Chancellor: Roy Jenkins; Chris Patten
- Preceded by: Sir Peter North
- Succeeded by: Sir John Hood

Master of Balliol College, Oxford
- In office 20 August 1994 – 16 March 2001
- Preceded by: Baruch Samuel Blumberg
- Succeeded by: Andrew Graham

Personal details
- Born: 25 August 1940 (age 86) Egypt
- Education: Lincoln College, Oxford
- Profession: Historian

Sir Colin Renshaw Lucas, FRHistS (born 25 August 1940) is a British historian and university administrator. From 1997 to 2004, he was the Vice-Chancellor of Oxford University. In May 2006, he was appointed Chair of the Board of the British Library for a four-year term ending 2010.

== Early life and education ==
Lucas was born in Egypt, the son of Frank Renshaw Lucas RA and Janine Charpentier. He was educated at Sherborne and at Lincoln College, Oxford.

== Academic career ==
After graduation, he took a post as a lecturer at the University of Sheffield (1965–69), and then later at the University of Manchester (1970–73). He became a Fellow and Tutor in Modern History at Balliol College in 1973. In 1990, he took a post at the University of Chicago as Professor of History, where he became chair of the History Department in 1992 and Dean of the Division of Social Sciences in 1993. He returned to Oxford in 1994 to become Master of Balliol College (1994–2000).

Lucas was the first Oxford Vice-Chancellor to serve for seven years (1997–2004), during which time he implemented many changes in the University governance structure, such as the adoption of external members to the University's Council, a radical restructuring of the committee system, division of academic departments, the establishment of a University Committee on Access and the adoption of new resource allocation and financial management systems.

On his retirement as Vice-Chancellor, Lucas was appointed Warden of Rhodes House, Oxford, responsible for the running of the Rhodes Scholarships (2004–2009). He had previously served as a Trustee of the Rhodes Trust.

== Personal life ==
Lucas is the godfather of the politician Boris Johnson. Lucas is married to Marie-Louise, Lady Lucas.

== Honours ==
In 2002, he was appointed Knight Bachelor for his services to higher education. He has been a Fellow of the Royal Historical Society (FRHistS) since 1973. He was awarded an Officier de l'Ordre des Arts et des Lettres (France) in 1990, Chevalier Ordre du Mérite in 1994, and Légion d'Honneur in 1998 (Officier in 2005). He was elected to the American Philosophical Society in 2004. In 2013, he was awarded a Doctor honoris causa by Heidelberg University. In 2014, he was awarded a Bronze Bauhinia Star by Government of Hong Kong Special Administrative Region.

Portraits of Sir Colin Lucas hang at Balliol College and at Rhodes House, Oxford (the latter by Bob Tulloch).

Academic offices
Preceded by Baruch Samuel Blumberg	Master of Balliol College, Oxford; 1994-2001	Succeeded by Andrew Winston Mawdsley Graham
Preceded by Sir Peter North	Vice-Chancellor of Oxford University; 1997–2004	Succeeded by Sir John Hood
Preceded by John Rowett	Warden of Rhodes House, Oxford; 2004–2009	Succeeded by Donald Markwell
