= Redelinghuys (surname) =

Redelinghuys is a surname. Notable people with the surname include:

- Johnny Redelinghuys (born 1984), Namibian rugby union player
- Julian Redelinghuys (born 1989), South African rugby union player
- Marius Redelinghuys (born 1987), South African politician
- Marno Redelinghuys (born 1993), South African rugby union player
