= Rosemary Dinnage =

British author and critic

Rosemary Dinnage (née Allen; 17 January 1928 – 10 July 2015) was a British author and critic. She was listed by The Observer as one of Britain's top 300 intellectuals in 2011.

== Biography ==
Rosemary Dinnage was born in Oxford and grew up in Rhodes House where her father, Sir Carleton Kemp Allen was Warden. After wartime evacuation to Canada, she studied English at Somerville College, Oxford.

Besides books, she published regular reviews in The New York Review of Books, for example, of Pat Barker's Regeneration Trilogy that Dinnage had made her "one of the most deserving winners of the prestigious Booker fiction prizes in recent years"; and in the London Review of Books.

In 2011, she featured in John Naughton's list of Britain's top 300 intellectuals, published in The Observer.

She died on 10 July 2015, aged 87.

== Bibliography ==
- Annie Besant (Lives of Modern Women), 1986, Penguin
- One to One: Experiences of Psychotherapy, 1988, Viking
- The Ruffian on the Stair, 1990, Viking
- Alone! Alone!: Lives of Some Outsider Women, 2004, Granta
- The Long Vacation, 2012, Lulu
