= John Rowett =

John Rowett OBE is a British historian, academic, and academic administrator.

== Career ==
John S. Rowett started his career at University College Wales in Aberystwyth, Wales, UK.

He was fellow and tutor in history at Brasenose College, Oxford, and was active in the creation of the Rothermere American Institute in the University of Oxford in the late 1990s.

He served as warden of Rhodes House, Oxford, from 1999 to 2004. As warden of Rhodes House at the time of the centenary of the Rhodes Trust in 2003, Rowett was active, alongside Rhodes Trust chair Lord Waldegrave of North Hill and Jakes Gerwel, chancellor of Rhodes University in South Africa, in the creation of the Mandela Rhodes Foundation, bringing together Nelson Mandela and the Rhodes Trust in a foundation providing scholarships to promote good leadership in Africa.

From 2005 to 2007 he served as secretary-general of the Association of Commonwealth Universities.

== Other roles ==
Rowett co-founded and edited the journal Twentieth Century British History, and co-edited the English Historical Review.

Apart from being a trustee of the Mandela Rhodes Foundation, Rowett was also a trustee of the King George VI and Queen Elizabeth Foundation in Windsor, and of the Oxford Centre for Islamic Studies as of 2006.

== Honours and recognition ==
In 2005, he received an OBE for his contribution to relations between Britain and South Africa.

Critical assessments of Rowett's leadership of the Rhodes Trust have been made by writers such as R.W. Johnson.

Academic offices
Preceded by Sir Anthony Kenny	Warden of Rhodes House, Oxford; 1999-2004	Succeeded by Sir Colin Lucas
