= Carleton Allen =

Australian-British academic (1887–1966)

Sir Carleton Kemp Allen MC QC FRSL FBA
- Allen in July 1945.
- Born: 7 September 1887; Carlton, Victoria, Australia
- Died: 11 December 1966 (aged 79); Oxford, England, United Kingdom
- Education: University of Sydney; University of Oxford
- Occupation: Professor
- Years active: 1910–1952
- Title: Warden of Rhodes House
- Spouses: Dorothy Frances (m. 1922; died 1959); Hilda (m. 1962)
- Children: 2 (including Rosemary Dinnage)
- Parent: William Allen

Sir Carleton Kemp Allen MC QC FRSL FBA (7 September 1887 – 11 December 1966) was an Australian-born professor and Warden of Rhodes House, University of Oxford. Entry by his successor as Warden of Rhodes House, E.T. Williams, in the Oxford Dictionary of National Biography.

== Early life and student career ==
Carleton Allen, or "C.K." as he came to be known, was born in Carlton, Victoria, the third son of William Allen, a Congregational minister and the younger brother of Leslie Holdsworth Allen. He was three when his family moved to Sydney, where he attended Newington College (1900–1906). In 1903 and 1904 he was awarded the Wigram Allen Scholarship, awarded by Sir George Wigram Allen, sharing it in 1904 with Howard McKern. At the end of 1905 he was named Dux of the College and received the Schofield Scholarship. At the University of Sydney he read classics and graduated Bachelor of Arts in 1910. Having won a scholarship to Oxford, he attended New College and studied jurisprudence under Sir Paul Vinogradoff. He took first-class honours in 1912 and was elected Eldon Law Scholar in 1913.

== Military and academic career ==
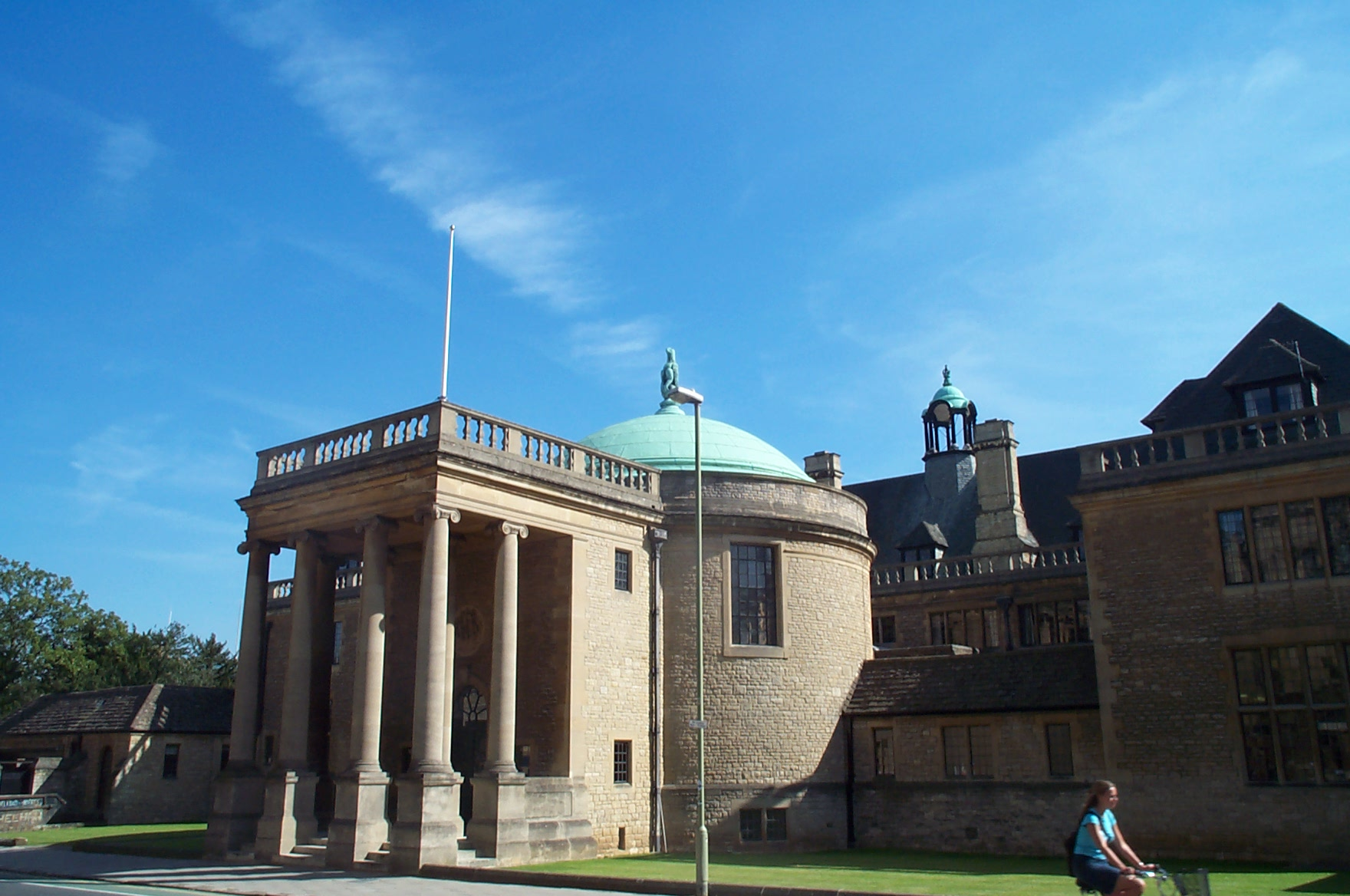
Rhodes House, where Allen was warden from 1931 to 1952

Allen was a captain in the 13th Battalion, Middlesex Regiment, in World War I, was wounded, and was awarded the Military Cross in 1918. At the end of the war, he was elected Stowell Civil Law Fellow of University College, Oxford and he remained a fellow of that college until his death. In 1926, he spent a year as Tagore professor at the University of Calcutta and published his lectures from that time as Law in the Making in 1927. This compilation became an established classic and he completed a seventh edition in 1965.

In 1929 he was appointed Professor of Jurisprudence at Oxford, but in 1931 became the second warden of Rhodes House. He filled this office with great distinction and he and his wife, Dorothy Frances Allen (1896–1959), whom he had married at Oxford in 1922, won the affection and respect of generations of Rhodes scholars. Dorothy Allen's memoirs, Sunlight and Shadow (1960) (which Allen brought to publication after her death), give an account of life at Rhodes House. On his retirement in 1952 he was knighted.

He died at Oxford and was survived by his second wife, Hilda, whom he had married in 1962, and by two children of his first marriage, a son and daughter (the writer Rosemary Dinnage). A portrait of hangs in Rhodes House, Oxford, and images of him are held by the National Portrait Gallery, London.

== Publications ==
- The Judgment of Paris: A Comedy (1924)
- Oh! Mr Leacock (1925)
- Law in the Making. Oxford: Clarendon Press. 1927 – via Internet Archive.
- Bureaucracy Triumphant (1931)
- Legal Duties and other essays in Jurisprudence. Oxford: Clarendon Press. 1931 – via Internet Archive.
- Democracy and the Individual. New York: Books for Libraries Press. 1943. ISBN 9780836929331., reprinted 1972.
- Law and Orders: An Inquiry into the Nature & Scope of Delegated Legislation and Executive Powers in England. London: Stevens & Sons, Limited. 1945 – via Internet Archive.
- The Queen's Peace (1953), his Hamlyn Lectures
- Law and Disorders: Legal Indiscretions. London: Stevens & Sons Limited. 1954.
- Aspects of Justice (1958); he also wrote two novels.

== Bibliography ==
- David Macmillan, Newington College 1863–1963 (Sydney, 1963)
- Peter Swain, Newington Across the Years 1893–1988 (Sydney, 1988)
- Lord Elton (1956). The First Fifty Years of the Rhodes Trust and the Rhodes Scholarships, 1903–1953. Oxford: Basil Blackwell.
- Dorothy Allen, Sunlight and Shadow: An Autobiography (Oxford University Press: London, 1960)

Awards
Preceded by Lindsay Dey	Schofield Scholarship; Dux of Newington College; 1905	Succeeded by James McKern

Academic offices
Preceded by Sir Francis Wylie	Warden of Rhodes House, Oxford; 1931–1952	Succeeded by Sir Edgar Williams
