= Lindsay Dey =

Australian paediatric physician (1886 – 1973)

Lindsay Dey CBE
- Born: May 31, 1886; Petersham, New South Wales
- Died: July 22, 1973; Bowral, New South Wales
- Education: Newington College; University of Sydney
- Occupation: Paediatrician
- Title: President (1946-1959); Royal Alexandra Hospital for Children
- Spouse(s): 1937, Marie, née Middleton
- Children: 5

Lindsay Alexander Dey (May 1886 – 22 July 1973) was an Australian paediatric physician who was the president of the Royal Alexandra Hospital for Children's Board of Management from 1946 until 1959.

== Early life ==
Dey was born at Petersham, New South Wales, the son of Dr Robert Dey, and attended Newington College (1897–1904). In 1902 and 1903 he was awarded the Wigram Allen Scholarship, awarded by Sir George Wigram Allen, sharing it in 1903 with Carleton Allen. At the end of 1904 he was named Dux of the College and received the Schofield Scholarship. He went up to the University of Sydney in 1905 from whence he graduated M.B. in 1910 and Ch.M. in 1912.

== Medical career ==
In 1917, Dey became an honorary medical officer at Royal Alexandra Hospital for Children. He was a member of the council of the New South Wales branch of the British Medical Association from 1926 until 1946, and president in 1937-38.

== Family ==
Dey and his wife Marie, a nursing sister, had three sons and two daughters. Three of his children followed him into medicine.

== Honours ==
- Commander of the Order of the British Empire (Civil) granted 13 June 1959 in recognition of service to medicine
- Lindsay Dey Outpatient wing of the new Children's Hospital at Westmead is named in his honour.

Awards
Preceded by Kenneth Golledge	Schofield Scholarship; Dux of Newington College; 1904	Succeeded by Carleton Allen
