= Lucy Sichone =

Zambian journalist and activist

- Born: 15 May 1954; Kitwe
- Died: August 24, 1998 (aged 44); University Teaching Hospital, Lusaka
- Citizenship: Zambia
- Education: Politics, Philosophy and Economics
- Alma mater: Somerville College, Oxford
- Occupation: Civil right activist
- Awards: Rhodes Scholarship

Lucy Banda-Sichone (1954–1998) was a Zambian civil rights activist who played a pivotal role in representing the Zambian people who had their rights violated by the State at the time. Born and raised in Zambia's second largest city, Kitwe, she became the first Zambian woman to receive a Rhodes Scholarship and also the first woman to have her portrait displayed on the walls of Oxford University's prestigious Rhodes House.

After attaining a BA in Politics, Philosophy and Economics at Somerville College, Oxford, Sichone returned to Zambia where she embarked upon a career as a lawyer focused on human rights issues. She represented several displaced villagers who had been accused of squatting, and represented them in court as pro bono clients. In 1993, Shichone formed the Zambia Civic Education Association (ZCEA).The aim of the association was to spread the gospel of human and democratic rights and to remind Zambians that it was not enough to have democracy on paper, but it had to be practiced. The association formed many civic education clubs within secondary schools around the country – her idea was to capture the imagination of the young whilst they could still dream.

Sichone was also engaged in politics. She joined the United National Independence Party (UNIP) shortly after it had lost to the Movement for Multiparty Democracy (MMD) in the 1991 presidential election. Although she held a number of positions in government, she was often its critic mainly because political office was never her goal. She left UNIP in 1994.

== Early life ==
Lucy Sichone was born on 15 May 1954. She grew up with a father who was very strict about her education. Having served as a butler for a British colonial family, he took a keen interest in getting his daughters educated. Lucy pursued her education at an all-girls convent secondary school. In 1978 she was accepted at the University of Zambia to study for a law degree. She obtained her degree in 1981 and won a Rhodes scholarship to study for a Philosophy and Economics degree at Oxford University in England.

Sichone married her first husband in 1979, after their daughter, Martha, turned five years old. After the death of her husband she experienced what is called "property grabbing," a practice which is still very common in Africa with household goods being taken by the late husband's relations. The “way I was left destitute,” Lucy wrote to the Principal of Somerville College at Oxford University after winning her Rhodes Scholarship, “has given me the idea of what I want to do…start a Legal Clinic for widows and orphans.”

Additionally, because she belonged to a patrilineal society her children belonged to her husband's side of the family. However, due to her legal knowledge and experience, she managed to win custody of her four children. Ten years after the death of her first husband, Sichone married her second husband.

== Social activism ==
Lucy Sichone represented many clients covering a wide range of issues including government land disputes and personal issues similar to those she had experienced as a widow. In 1993, she formed The Zambia Civic Education Association (ZCEA), a non-profit human rights organisation meant to empower Zambian citizens in coping with civic rights and responsibilities. ZCEA was established to promote the development of democratic process in Zambia as well as promote justice through increasing awareness among all citizens about their duties and responsibilities under the Constitution. Sichone believed that it is the execution of duties and responsibilities that bestow rights, privileges and equality for all before the law.

Sichone decided to go into politics. When many supported the Movement for Multi-Party Democracy (MMD), the party that had just won the momentous 1991 elections that removed Kenneth Kaunda from power, Sichone decided to join the United National Independence Party (UNIP). UNIP, having ruled Zambia for 27 years and lost the 1991 elections, was in decline. However, she when left the party in 1994, she started to experience problems with fellow members of the central committee.

In 1993 she began contributing to the independent daily newspaper The Post. As her columns challenged the MMD government and its manipulation of constitutional provisions, two memorable events happened which thrust her into the limelight and confirmed her position. In February 1996, Sichone wrote an article titled “Miyanda has forgotten about need for justice”. Godfrey Miyanda was then Vice President and leader of government business in parliament. An order to arrest Sichone along with the newspaper's managing editor and chief editor was issued. Sichone and two of her colleagues, managing editor and chief editor of the paper, were forced into hiding to avoid imprisonment on charges of contempt of Parliament after the Zambian National Assembly. After the order, there was a lot of international pressure from human rights groups, journalists and legal groups to absolve her because she had a three-month-old baby at that time.

The other two surrendered to the authorities, but Sichone did not and remained hiding. While at large, she continued to write columns for The Post, and declared she would not submit to National Assembly Speaker Robinson Nabulyato's unconstitutional decree. She wrote, “The freedoms enshrined in the Bill of Rights make it a sacred duty for me to defend them to the death.” She ended up becoming the first Zambian to win the International Women Media Foundation Courage in Journalism Award in 1996 for the same article. She eventually gave herself up and a form of truce existed between her and the authorities. In December 1998, after her death, the State appeal against the editors and the late Sichone was adjourned after the Supreme Court failed to form a quorum.

== Death and legacy ==
Lucy Sichone died at the age of 44 at the University Teaching Hospital (UTH) in Lusaka, on August 24, 1998. Editor-in-chief of The Post, Fred M'membe, who was also a close personal friend, said Zambia had lost one of its daughters.

In his tribute, journalist Bright Mwape said of her a year before his death in 1999, "Lucy made herself a spectacle for bemused lesser mortals who clapped and marveled at her courage without enough stamina to lend a hand. She fought battles to defend the lives of others even when her own was failing her. We are a rhetoric people and that is what Lucy was not. When will another Lucy live?”

Grieve Chelwa wrote in 2015, "I had the rare privilege of meeting Lucy Sichone in 1998, the year she died, during a prize giving ceremony for students who had done a lot to advance civic education at their schools. She gave me a certificate carrying her immortal signature and asked all the recipients that day to carry her dream even further."

In 2015, Lucy's friend and attorney Dr. Ann Olivarius commissioned a portrait of Lucy to hang in Rhodes House, the Oxford home of the scholarship. The Rhodes Project also published a recollection of Lucy by her daughter, Martha Sichone Cameron.
