= Mandela Rhodes Scholarship =

Scholarship for postgraduate study for African citizens

The Mandela Rhodes Scholarship is a scholarship which provides funding for up to two years of postgraduate study at a South African university. It is awarded by the Mandela Rhodes Foundation. Recipients of the scholarship are referred to as Mandela Rhodes Scholars and are designated similarly to Rhodes Scholars, e.g. "Pie-Pacifique Kabalira Uwase (Rwanda & University of KwaZulu-Natal, 2006)".

== History and aims ==
The Mandela Rhodes Foundation is one of Nelson Mandela’s three official legacy organisations, founded in 2003 in partnership with The Rhodes Trust. The Foundation was announced in February 2002 when The Rhodes Trust, as part of its centenary celebrations, partnered with Nelson Mandela and pledged funding for the scholarship for 10 years. Jakes Gerwel, chancellor of Rhodes University and Rhodes Trust CEO John Rowett hatched the idea. The Rhodes Trust wished to return some of Rhodes' wealth to South Africa and Africa "in a symbolic act of reconciliation and reparation". It was determined that funding of £1 million would be provided annually to the foundation for the scholarships.

The mission of the foundation, which was established in 2003, is to help build exceptional leadership capacity in Africa. Mandela's intention was to "close the circle of history" by utilising Cecil Rhodes' resources to address the inequalities that result from the legacies of colonialism and apartheid. The name of the foundation is intentionally provocative; "it is a call for the beneficiaries of colonialism to participate in and contribute to repairing the damage of colonial times and building a more just society".

The first eight Mandela Rhodes Scholarships were awarded in 2005. By 2025, 734 scholarships had been awarded to future leaders from 37 African countries.

== Eligibility and coverage ==
The award is open to all citizens of African countries. Applicants must be under the age of 30 years and recipients must study towards Honours or Master's degrees at recognised South African institutions. Recipients of the Mandela Rhodes Scholarship are students with outstanding academic achievements who also possess leadership ability, entrepreneurial skills, and a commitment to reconciliation.

The scholarships are comprehensive and cover tuition, accommodation, meals, book allowance, general allowance, and travel expenses. In addition to receiving funding for their studies, scholars also undertake a leadership development program while in residence.

== Notable Mandela Rhodes Scholars ==
- Ntokozo Qwabe, founder of the Rhodes Must Fall in Oxford campaign
- Mark John Burke, South African Member of Parliament for the Democratic Alliance
- Marius Redelinghuys, former South African Member of Parliament (MP)
