= Peter North (legal scholar) =

British academic lawyer

Sir Peter North CBE QC FBA

Vice-Chancellor of the University of Oxford
- In office 8 February 1993 – 10 January 1997
- Chancellor: Roy Jenkins
- Preceded by: Sir Richard Southwood
- Succeeded by: Sir Colin Lucas

Principal of Jesus College, Oxford
- In office 3 February 1984 – 5 January 2005
- Preceded by: Sir John Habakkuk
- Succeeded by: The Lord Krebs

Personal details
- Born: 30 August 1936 (age 90)
- Education: Keble College, Oxford
- Profession: Academic lawyer

Sir Peter Machin North CBE QC FBA (born 30 August 1936) is a British academic lawyer who served as Principal of Jesus College, Oxford, from 1984 to 2005 and Vice-Chancellor of the University of Oxford from 1993 to 1997.

== Early life and education ==
North was born on 30 August 1936 in Nottingham, England. He was educated at the Humberstone Foundation School, a state school in Cleethorpes, Lincolnshire, and at Oakham School, a private school in Oakham, Rutland. From 1954 to 1956, he undertook national service as a second lieutenant in the Royal Leicestershire Regiment of the British Army. He then studied at Keble College, Oxford, graduating with a Bachelor of Arts (BA) degree in 1959, a Bachelor of Civil Law (BCL) degree in 1960, and a Doctor of Civil Law (DCL) degree in 1976.

== Career ==
North began his academic career as a teaching fellow at Northwestern University in Chicago, United States, between 1960 and 1961. He then returned to the United Kingdom, and was an assistant lecturer (1961–1962) and then a lecturer (1962–1963) at the University College of Wales, Aberystwyth. He moved to the University of Nottingham, where he was a lecturer from 1963 to 1965.

Returning to his alma mater, he was tutor in law (1965–1976) and a fellow (1965–1984) of Keble College, Oxford. In 1984, he was elected Principal of Jesus College, Oxford. Additionally, he twice served as pro-vice-chancellor of the University of Oxford (1988–1993 and 1997–2005). From 1993 to 1997, he served as head of the university as its vice-chancellor. He retired in 2005, and was appointed an honorary fellow of Jesus College.

=== Reviews ===
North chaired the Review Body of the Independent Review on Parades and Marches in Northern Ireland, whose final report (published on 29 January 1997 and widely known as "The North Report") led to the establishment of the Parades Commission which regulates potentially controversial parades in Northern Ireland.

North was also chair of a University of Oxford inquiry, established to review the running of the university. The report, published on 29 January 1998 (precisely one year after the Parades and Marches report), was also known as "The North Report". He was knighted on 10 March 1998.

More recently, North's review of the legal alcohol limit for driving was submitted to Philip Hammond, the then Secretary of State for Transport at the end of May 2010.

Academic offices
Preceded by Sir John Habakkuk	Principal of Jesus College, Oxford; 1984–2005	Succeeded by Lord Krebs
Preceded by Sir Richard Southwood	Vice-Chancellor of Oxford University; 1993–1997	Succeeded by Sir Colin Lucas
