= Jakes Gerwel =

South African politician (1946–2012)

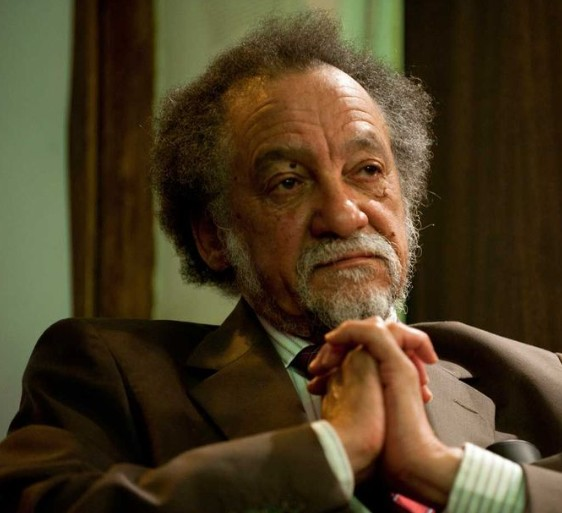

Director-general, Office of the President of South Africa
- In office 1994–1999
- President: Nelson Mandela

Secretary of the Cabinet, Government of National Unity
- In office 1994–1997
- President: Nelson Mandela

Chancellor, Rhodes University
- In office 1999–2012
- Preceded by: Gavin Relly
- Succeeded by: Lex Mpati

Vice-chancellor, University of the Western Cape
- In office 1987–1994

Personal details
- Born: Gert Johannes Gerwel; 18 January 1946 Somerset East, Union of South Africa
- Died: 28 November 2012 (aged 66) Cape Town, South Africa
- Citizenship: South African
- Party: African National Congress
- Spouse: Phoebe Gerwel (née Abrahams)
- Education: University of Brussels, University of the Western Cape
- Positions: Global Chairman, Aurecon (2009–2012); Chairman, Media24 (2007-2012); Chairman, South African Airways (2004); Chairperson of Policy Committee, Cricket World Cup (2003); Chair, Human Sciences Research Council (1999–2012)

Gert Johannes Gerwel (18 January 1946 – 28 November 2012) known mononymously as Jakes, was a South African academic and anti-apartheid activist. He served as director-general of the presidency when Nelson Mandela was in office. In 1999 Gerwel was instrumental in brokering the deal under which Lockerbie bombing suspects were extradited to Scotland. Following Mandela's presidency, Gerwel chaired the Nelson Mandela Foundation and the Mandela Rhodes Foundation, and also took up a number of academic and business positions until his death in November 2012.

== Early life and education ==
Gert Johannes Gerwel was born in 1946 to farmworkers on a sheep ranch in the town of Kommadagga, which is situated between Grahamstown and Somerset East on South Africa’s Eastern Cape. Gerwel matriculated from Paterson High School in Port Elizabeth, and from 1965 to 1967, Gerwel pursued a degree in Afrikaans-Nederlands at the University of the Western Cape. In 1971, Gerwel began studying at the University of Brussels and received his doctorate in literature and philosophy in 1979 for his thesis “Literature and Apartheid.”

== Career ==
Gerwel lectured at the Hewat Teachers' Training College in Crawford, Cape Town for eighteen months before continuing his education at the Vrije Universiteit Brussel (VUB). Gerwel returned to the University of the Western Cape in 1980 as a professor. He became UWC’s dean of the Arts faculty in 1982 and was later appointed vice-chancellor of UWC in June 1987. Gerwel would serve as vice-chancellor of the University of the Western Cape for the next seven years, until he was appointed director general of the president by Nelson Mandela in his post-Apartheid Cabinet. Following the end of Mandela’s term in office in 1999, Gerwel served as chancellor of Rhodes University in Grahamstown, South Africa, till his death in 2012.

== Educational philosophy and achievements ==
Gerwel worked to redress the issues Black South African students faced in gaining access to tertiary education. He was particularly critical of the university admissions process and the misuse of financial resources. In his 1992 article “Persistent Problems at the Tertiary Level: Some Possible Solutions Developing at the University of the Western Cape”, Gerwel insisted that the matric symbol a student received on their matric exam was an indication of their ability to work hard and overcome disadvantages and therefore should have been a larger factor in predicting a student’s future performance at university. Aware of the impact that one’s upbringing and discrepancies in education have on a person, Gerwel was not arguing the matric symbol should be an absolute measure, but rather a relative measure. Gerwel also posited solutions to deal with the financial hardships that UWC was facing. At the time the article was written in 1988, the University of the Western Cape’s state subsidy had been slashed by 52% and the Department of Education had paused its allocation of bursaries to incoming African students. 7,866 of the 10,592 students attending UWC received financial assistance from either the UWC Bursary Committee, the state, or the private sector, placing immense strain on the university’s finances. Gerwel suggested that the university move away from bursaries and embrace forms of financial assistance that involve the employment of students. He vouched for the creation of teaching assistantships that reduced a student’s tuition fees in exchange for their labor, as well as the creation of a Small Business Institute that allowed students to establish enterprises on a profit sharing business between the founders and the university.

During his time at the University of the Western Cape, Gerwel catalyzed its shift away from the apartheid educational paradigm. In his 1987 inaugural address as Vice-Chancellor of the UWC, Gerwel famously advocated for the university to declare, “the democratic movement as the dominant ideological orientation describing our operative context.” He argued that the UWC could represent the radical Left in an educational sphere that was dominated by Afrikaner nationalism and anglophone liberalism. Though Gerwel supported the idea of the UWC subscribing to a Leftist ideological orientation, he assured students that the university was committed to scholarly discourse and research.

== Legacy ==
In January 2015 Vanguard Drive (the M7 road), a major road running from Cape Town's northern suburbs to the Cape Flats, was renamed in Jakes Gerwel's honour.

Jakes Gerwel Technical School in Bonnievale, Western Cape is named in after him.
