= Marius Redelinghuys =

South African politician

The Honourable Marius Redelinghuys MP

Member of the National Assembly
- In office 8 May 2014 – 30 June 2017
- Leader: Helen Zille

National Spokesperson: Democratic Alliance
- In office 30 May 2014 – 10 July 2015
- Preceded by: Mmusi Maimane
- Succeeded by: Refiloe Ntsekhe

Personal details
- Born: Marius Helenis Redelinghuys; 15 September 1987 (age 39) Middelburg, Transvaal Province
- Party: COPE (2009 - 2011); DA (2011–2018)
- Education: University of Pretoria; University of the Free State

Marius "Manqoba" Redelinghuys (born 15 September 1987) is a South African politician and a former Member of Parliament for the Democratic Alliance (DA).

He was first elected to the National Assembly on 7 May following the 2014 national elections and resigned in 2017. For a year he had also been one of two DA National Spokespersons

He is also a former chairperson of the Mandela Rhodes Community, an alumni network for the Mandela Rhodes Scholarship.

== Early life and education ==
Redelinghuys was born in 1987 in Middelburg in what was then known as the Transvaal Province. He matriculated with distinction in 2005 at Hoërskool Brits in Brits, North West.

Redelinghuys obtained a BPolSci (Political Science) degree with distinction from the University of Pretoria in 2008. He was awarded a Mandela Rhodes Scholarship in 2009 to complete his BA (Hons) Political Studies degree, which obtained in the same year, also with distinction.

In 2022, Redelinghuys was conferred an LLB from the University of the Free State with distinction and was awarded the Dean's Medal.

== Early career ==
At first Redelinghuys pursued a career in academia, tutoring at the University of Pretoria and later lecturing at the Midrand Graduate Institute in Midrand, Johannesburg.

At this time, Redelinghuys was also actively involved in the Congress of the People in various roles, and was ultimately appointed as the National Spokesperson for its Youth Movement.

In October 2011, following his resignation from COPE, he took up the position of Parliamentary Research and Communications Officer for the Democratic Alliance in Cape Town, specifically working on the Security Cluster, which included the Ministries of Police, Justice and Constitutional Development, State Security, Defence and Military Veterans, and Correctional Services.

Eight months later, Redelinghuys was appointed the Director of Communications and Research for the DA in the Gauteng Provincial Legislature, a position that he held for approximately two years until his election to Parliament in May 2014.

== Political career ==
Redelinghuys first became involved in party politics during the 2006 local government elections and was actively involved in student politics while still at university, serving as a Member of the Student Parliament in 2009

In the 2011 local government elections he unsuccessfully stood as a Congress of the People candidate for City of Tshwane ward 65, which is located in Centurion and mainly covers Irene.

Redelinghuys stood as a DA parliamentary candidate from Gauteng in the 2014 national elections, and was subsequently elected to the National Assembly and sworn in on 21 May 2014.

On 30 May 2014, DA Federal Executive Chairperson James Selfe announced that he was appointed, along with fellow Member of Parliament Phumzile van Damme, as one of two National Spokespersons for the party following the election of National Spokesperson Mmusi Maimane as Parliamentary Leader. According to Selfe, "the appointment of two national spokespeople was deemed necessary in light of the growth of the DA in the 7 May general elections and the increased need to reach a broader spectrum of South African society".

On 8 December 2014, Redelinghuys posted an article on his Facebook page under the heading "Blacks are right to mistrust whites". On 28 June 2015, a politician of the Freedom Front Plus picked up on this and posted it on his own Facebook page. This he followed up on 3 July 2015 with a question via a tweet to the DA leadership regarding their position on Redelinghuys' views. After numerous retweets, the DA leader Mmusi Maimane appointed a new second national spokesperson in Refiloe Ntsekhe to take over from Redelinghuys.

== Personal life ==
In November 2014 Redelinghuys married Steven Hussey, a fellow Mandela Rhodes Scholar, and currently lives in Gauteng.

== Offices held ==
Political offices
Preceded by Mmusi Maimane	National Spokesperson for the Opposition; 30 May 2014 – 10 July 2015	Succeeded by Refiloe Ntsekhe
