= Rhodes House =

Building at the University of Oxford

Coordinates: 51°45′27″N 1°15′18″W

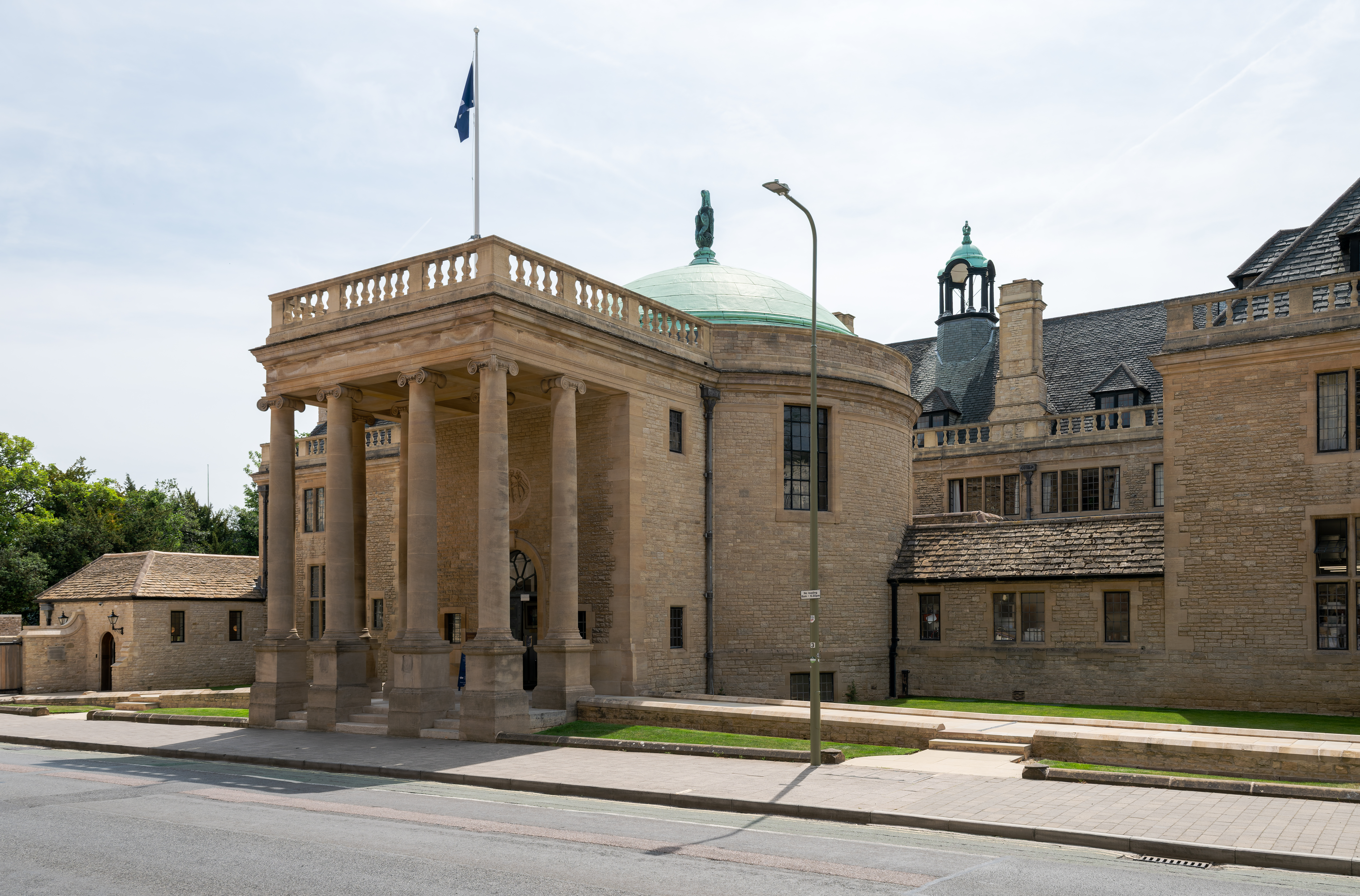
- Rhodes House from South Parks Road in 2025
- Interactive map of the Rhodes House area

General information
- Architectural style: Arts and Crafts
- Location: South Parks Road, Oxford OX1 3RG
- Year built: 1926—1928
- Owner: University of Oxford

Design and construction
- Architect: Sir Herbert Baker

Listed Building – Grade II*
- Official name: Rhodes House
- Designated: 12 January 1954
- Reference no.: 1076964

Rhodes House is a building of the University of Oxford in England. It is located on South Parks Road in central Oxford, and was built in memory of Cecil Rhodes, an alumnus of the university and a major benefactor. It is listed Grade II* on the National Heritage List for England.

== History ==
The will of Cecil Rhodes (1853–1902) created scholarships that became known as Rhodes Scholarships, administered by the Rhodes Trust.

Construction of Rhodes House began in 1926 after the Rhodes Trust purchased the two-acre plot from Wadham College the previous year. The mansion was designed by architect Sir Herbert Baker and modelled on the Cape Dutch farmhouse design and traditional English Country mansions. This is reflected in the large beams, trans-domed windows and its Tetra-style portico. The square rubble walls were designed to be consistent with the Western European 17th century architecture of the Oxford University campus. Other features include the open-well staircase constructed from oak, featuring shaped balusters and carved eagle finials. Construction was completed in 1928 and the building and its library were handed over to Oxford University.

Rhodes House was commissioned by the Rhodes Trust as a memorial to Cecil Rhodes, to act as a centre for research for the "British Empire and Commonwealth, of African and the United States of America", and to be the headquarters of the Rhodes Scholarship system and Rhodes Trust.

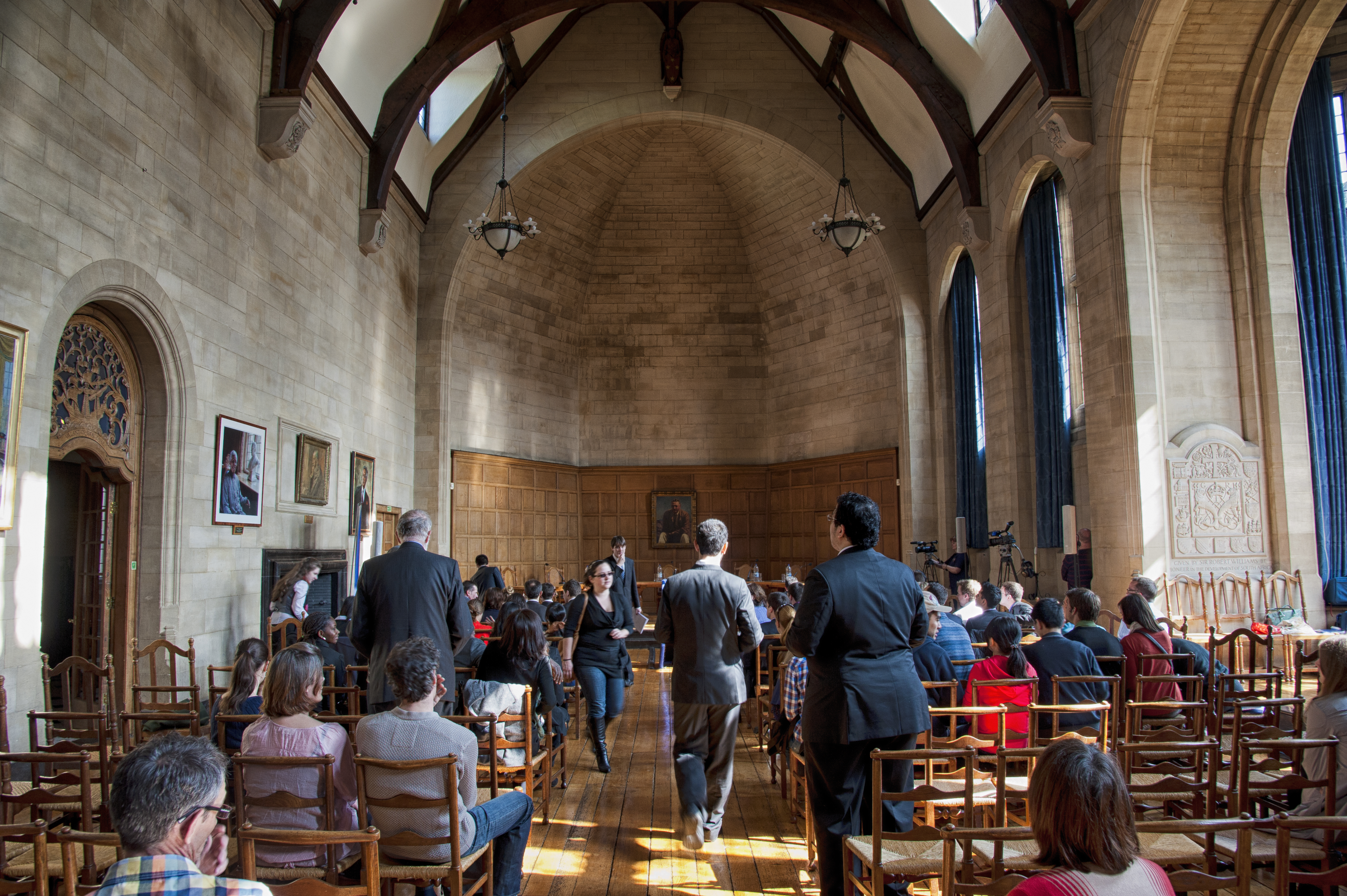
The great hall (Milner Hall) in Rhodes House, being used for the Price Moot Court competition

Sir Herbert Baker, described as "Cecil Rhodes' own architect", was the sole-architect of Rhodes House. Architectural sculpture was provided by Charles Wheeler, who also worked on other inter-war colonial buildings including: India House, South Africa House and the Neuve Chapelle Indian Memorial. Rhodes House features a series of public rooms included a library, reading room, lecture hall and seminar rooms, a hall in which the Rhodes Scholars hold their annual dinner and the residence for the Rhodes Trust Oxford Secretary or Warden.

During 1931, Albert Einstein delivered a series of three lectures at Rhodes House. Edmund Bowen, a chemistry don at the university, saved the blackboard used in the second lecture (on 16 May). Einstein's Blackboard, now an iconic object, can still be seen at the Museum of the History of Science in Oxford, formally presented by Sir Francis Wylie, the Warden of Rhodes House at the time.

=== Rhodes House Library ===
When Rhodes House was completed all the material relating to the British Empire and U.S. were transferred from the Bodleian Library. Also known as the Bodleian Library of Commonwealth & African Studies at Rhodes House. In 1990 the library held more than 330,000 books and the archives relating to US and other former colonies and dominions of the British Empire. The Library was a key research centre in the UK.

In 2014 the Library moved to the Weston Library. The Library is now known as the Commonwealth and African Studies Collections.

== Portraits at Rhodes House ==
Rhodes House houses a significant collection of paintings and photographic portraits and busts, including of:

- Queen Elizabeth II
- Cecil Rhodes, the Founder of the Rhodes Scholarships
- John McCall MacBain, philanthropist
- Zambian human rights activist Lucy Banda-Sichone; her portrait, unveiled in 2015, was the first of a woman Rhodes Scholar ever displayed in Rhodes House.
- Human rights activist and constitutional lawyer, Dr Menaka Guruswamy.
- Former US President Bill Clinton
- Former US President Ronald Reagan
- Philosopher and first African-American Rhodes Scholar Alain Locke
- Former Jamaican Prime Minister Norman Manley
- Jamaican cultural icon Rex Nettleford
- George Robert Parkin, the founding Organizing Secretary of the Rhodes Trust
- Busts of early Rhodes Trustees Viscount Milner and Otto Beit
- Canadian neuroscientist Wilder Penfield
- Former Australian Prime Minister Bob Hawke
- President Wasim Sajjad (Pakistan)
- Former Prime Minister John Turner (Canada)
- Former Prime Minister Dominic Mintoff (Malta)
- Neurophysiologist and Nobel Prize winner, Sir John Eccles
- Pharmacologist and Nobel Prize winner, Sir Howard Florey
- Former United States national security advisor, Susan Rice
- Anti-Apartheid activist, Bram Fischer
- Former United States health secretary, Sylvia Burwell
- Former Canadian Deputy Prime Minister, Chrystia Freeland
- Philanthropist, Chuck Feeney
- Economist and Nobel Prize winner, Professor Michael Spence
- Former Chairs of the Rhodes Trust, including Sir Kenneth Wheare, Robert Blake, Baron Blake, and Lord Waldegrave of North Hill
- Former Wardens of Rhodes House – Sir Francis Wylie, Sir Carleton Allen, Sir Edgar Williams, Dr Robin Fletcher, Sir Anthony Kenny, Dr John Rowett, Sir Colin Lucas, and Professor Donald Markwell.
- Former South African President Nelson Mandela, who joined his name with Cecil Rhodes in the Mandela Rhodes Foundation

== The Rhodes Trust ==
Rhodes Trust Act 1929
- Act of Parliament
- Parliament of the United Kingdom
- Long title: An Act to amend the provisions of the Will of the late Right Honourable Cecil John Rhodes and for other purposes.
- Citation: 19 & 20 Geo. 5. c. xc

Dates
- Royal assent: 10 May 1929

Text of statute as originally enacted

Rhodes Trust Act 1946
- Act of Parliament
- Parliament of the United Kingdom
- Long title: An Act to incorporate the trustees of the will of the late Right Honourable Cecil John Rhodes and for other purposes.
- Citation: 9 & 10 Geo. 6. c. 2 Pr.

Dates
- Royal assent: 26 July 1946

Text of statute as originally enacted

The Rhodes Trust is based at Rhodes House. The Rhodes Trust, established in 1902 under the terms and conditions of the will of Cecil Rhodes, and by subsequent acts of Parliament, is an educational charity whose principal activity is to support scholars selected from the citizens of 14 specified geographic constituencies to study at the University of Oxford. Rhodes Scholarships for up to three years have been awarded annually since 1903. The goals of Cecil Rhodes in creating the Scholarships were to promote civic-minded leadership among young people with (in the words of his 1899 Will) "moral force of character and instincts to lead", and (in the words of a 1901 codicil to his Will) to help "render war impossible" through promoting understanding between the great powers.

In 2002, in partnership with Nelson Mandela, the Rhodes Trust established the Mandela Rhodes Scholarship. The Rhodes Trust provides the Rhodes Scholarships in partnership with the Second Century Founders, John McCall MacBain O.C., the Atlantic Philanthropies, and other benefactors. In 2016 the Trust announced a partnership with Atlantic Philanthropies to create an Atlantic Institute, which has offices at Rhodes House. Funding for this project allowed the Trust to expand the total number of Rhodes Scholars and to offer scholarships to students from Syria, Jordan, Lebanon, Palestine, Israel, China, and West Africa.

In 2017, the Schmidt Science Fellows programme was launched as a partnership between Schmidt Futures and the Rhodes Trust. The programme was established to facilitate cross-discipline research that could lead to scientific breakthroughs.

The Rhodes Trust is governed by a Board of Trustees, and the Warden of Rhodes House acts as Secretary to the Trust.

=== Current trustees ===
The following are trustees:

- Dapo Akande (professor of public international law at the University of Oxford)
- Mr Andrew Banks (Florida & St Edmund Hall 1976) – Co-Founder, ABRY Partners
- Ms Neeti Bhalla (Kenya & Templeton 1998) – Executive Vice President and Chief Investment Officer for Liberty Mutual Insurance Group
- Mr Mike Fitzpatrick (Chairman of Pacific Current Group)
- Dame Helen Ghosh – Master of Balliol College, Oxford
- Mr Don Gogel (New Jersey & Balliol 1971) – Chairman and CEO of Clayton, Dubilier & Rice
- Mr Glen James former partner of Slaughter and May
- Dr Tariro Makadzange (Zimbabwe & Balliol 1999) – Director of Biology at Gilead Sciences
- Ms Swati Mylavarapu (Florida & Wolfson 2005) – Founder of Incite.org, a values-based investor and co-founder of Arena
- Professor Karen O'Brien (Head of Humanities Division and Professor of English Literature)
- Kate O'Regan (Director of the Bonavero Institute of Human Rights at the University of Oxford)
- Mr Chris Oechsli – President and CEO of The Atlantic Philanthropies
- Dilip Shanghvi – Co-founder of Sun Pharmaceuticals
- Judge Karen Stevenson (United States Magistrate and Judge)
- Dr Peter Stamos (California & Worcester 1981) – Founder, Chief Executive Officer of Stamos Capital Partners
- Mr Bob Sternfels (California & Worcester 1992) Senior Partner at McKinsey & Company
- Sir John Hood (New Zealand & Worcester College, 1976), Chairman (since 2011)
- Professor John Bell (Alberta & Magdalen College, 1975) (since 2002)
- Professor Ngaire Woods (New Zealand & Balliol College, 1987) (since 2009)
- Dominic Barton (British Columbia & Brasenose College, 1984) (since 2010)
- Don Gogel (New Jersey & Balliol College, 1971) (since 2010)
- Professor Margaret MacMillan (since 2010)
- John McCall MacBain (Quebec & Wadham College, 1980) (since 2010)
- Karen Stevenson (Maryland & Magdalen College, 1979) (since 2010)
- John Wylie (Queensland & Balliol College, 1983) (since 2010)
- Glen James (since 2014)
- Andrew Banks (Florida & St Edmund Hall, 1976) (since 2014)
- Professor Dame Carol Robinson (since 2015)
- Nicholas Oppenheimer (since 2015)
- Professor Elleke Boehmer (South Africa-at-Large and St John's College, 1985) (since 2016)
- Dilip Shanghvi (since 2017)
- Mike Fitzpatrick (Western Australia & St John's College, 1975) (since 2018)
- Peter Stamos (California & Worcester College, 1981) (since 2018)

==== Emeritus trustees ====
- Julian Thompson (Diocesan College, Rondebosch and Worcester College, 1953) (trustee since 2002, emeritus since 2015)
- Michael McCaffery (Pennsylvania & Merton College, 1975) (trustee since 2007, emeritus since 2018)

==== Notable former trustees ====
- Lord Butler of Brockwell
- Sir Rod Eddington
- Earl Grey
- Viscount Hailsham
- Rudyard Kipling

=== List of chairmen of the Trust ===
- Earl of Rosebery 1902–1917
- Viscount Milner 1917–1925
- Sir Otto Beit 1925–1930
- Lord Lovat 1930–1933
- Rt Hon. L. S. Amery 1933–1955
- Sir Edward Peacock 1955–1962
- Sir Kenneth Wheare 1962–1969
- Sir George Abell 1969–1974
- Viscount Harcourt 1974–1979
- Sir William Paton 1979–1982
- Lord Blake 1983–1987
- Sir John Baring, later Lord Ashburton 1987–1999
- Sir Richard Southwood 1999–2002
- Lord Waldegrave of North Hill 2002–2011
- Sir John Hood 2011–Present

=== List of wardens ===
Wardens also serve as the chief executive officer of Rhodes Trust and Rhodes Scholarships

- Sir Francis Wylie 1903–1931
- Professor Sir Carleton Allen 1931–1952
- Brigadier Sir Edgar Williams 1952–1980
- Dr Robin Fletcher 1980–1989
- Sir Anthony Kenny 1989–1999
- Dr John Rowett 1999–2004
- Sir Colin Lucas 2004–2009
- Professor Don Markwell 2009–2012
- Dr Andrew Graham (acting) 2012–2013
- Charles R. Conn 2013–2018
- Dr Elizabeth Kiss August 2018–31 December 2024
- Sir Richard Trainor (interim) 1 January 2025 – 1 July 2026
- The Honourable Chrystia Freeland 1 July 2026–
