= Francis Wylie =

British academic (1865–1952)

Sir Francis James Wylie (18 October 1865 – 29 October 1952) was a British university academic and administrator. He was the first Warden of Rhodes House at the University of Oxford, England.

Francis Wylie was educated at St Edward's School, Oxford, the University of Glasgow, and Balliol College, Oxford, where he received a first class degree in Literae Humaniores in 1888. He became a lecturer at Balliol College in 1891 and a Fellow of Brasenose College in 1892. His research was in the area of English literature. He was coauthor of the book, The Poetry of Matthew Arnold; A Commentary.

Wylie was supervisor of the Rhodes Trust scheme at the University of Oxford and became Warden of Rhodes House in Oxford from 1903 to 1931. He presented Einstein's Blackboard in the Museum of the History of Science in Oxford (saved by University dons on 16 May 1931) after Albert Einstein's series of three lectures at Rhodes House that year.

Wylie had the custom of writing a personal letter to every past Rhodes scholar timed to arrive on the date of the scholar's birthday. This meant writing by hand up to 2000 such letters a year, and after his death, his wife, Lady Wylie, continued this in his place. For one pre-Great War scholar from Germany who later emigrated to Africa this letter was a memorable feature of life for the whole family, and led the next generation of Popps to become good friends with later generations of Wylies.

He was knighted in 1929 and became an Honorary Fellow of Brasenose College in 1931. In 1933, Wylie received an honorary degree from Bowdoin College in the USA.

Wylie's fourth son, born in Oxford, was Shaun Wylie (1913–2009), a mathematician who worked at Bletchley Park during World War II.

A portrait of Sir Francis Wylie hangs in Rhodes House, Oxford, and there are images of him held by the National Portrait Gallery, London.

Academic offices
Preceded by New institution	Warden of Rhodes House, Oxford; 1903–1931	Succeeded by Sir Carleton Allen
