= Richard Southwood =

Zoologist, Vice-Chancellor of the University of Oxford

Sir Richard Southwood GOM DL FRS

Vice-Chancellor of the University of Oxford
- In office 10 June 1989 – 8 February 1993
- Chancellor: Roy Jenkins
- Preceded by: The Lord Neill of Bladen
- Succeeded by: Sir Peter North

Personal details
- Born: 20 June 1931
- Died: 26 October 2005 (aged 74)
- Awards: Linnean Medal (1988); Fellow of the Royal Society; Peter Scott Memorial Award
- Scientific career
- Institutions: University of Oxford; Imperial College London; Rothamsted Experimental Station

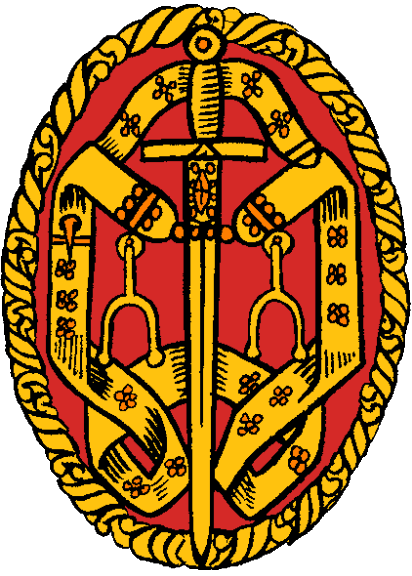
Insignia of a Knight Bachelor

Sir Thomas Richard Edmund Southwood GOM DL FRS (20 June 1931 – 26 October 2005) was a British biologist, professor of zoology and vice-chancellor of the University of Oxford. A specialist on entomology, he developed the field of insect ecology and the development of study techniques. He wrote a landmark textbook on Ecological Methods that went into numerous editions. He also was well known for developing the field of entomology through mentorship of a circle of researchers at Silwood Park.

== Biography ==
Southwood was born in Marlborough Cottage in Northfleet near Gravesend, where his father's family dealt in farm and dairy products. In 1935 the family moved to Parrock Manor. His parents encouraged his interest in natural history. Richard became interested in natural history at an early age, and developed his skills on the family dairy farm in Kent; he had his first research article on sunbathing in birds in British Birds when he was fifteen and about insects published in the Entomologist's Monthly Magazine when he was a year older. His father had received some education at the Wye College. Other early influences included Tom Longstaff. He was educated at Bronte School, Gravesend Grammar School and Imperial College London BSc in biology, MSc botany, then worked for his PhD degree in zoology studies at Rothamsted Experimental Station. He returned to Imperial as a research assistant and lecturer, and in 1967 became head of the department of zoology and applied entomology, and director of Imperial College's Field Station at Silwood Park. He later became dean of science and chair of the division of life sciences.

Southwood's research at Imperial concentrated on insect communities and population dynamics. His 1966 book Ecological Methods described techniques available for the study of populations and ecosystems, including population estimates with different sampling techniques.

In 1979, he took up the Linacre Chair of Zoology in the University of Oxford, and was elected a Fellow of Merton College. In 1989, he moved from being head of the department of zoology to take up the vice-chancellorship of the university, from which position he set up a working party that would recommend the reform of the university's governance. Having stepped down from that position in 1993, he continued to research, teach and write, and in 2003 published The Story of Life, a book based on the first-year undergraduate lectures he gave at Oxford.

Southwood served as chairman of the Royal Commission on Environmental Pollution from 1981 to 1985, having been first appointed to the commission in 1974. Under his chairmanship, the 1983 report Lead in the Environment aroused public concern about lead pollution. He was chairman of the National Radiological Protection Board from 1985 until 1994, and also chaired the Working Party on Bovine Spongiform Encephalopathy (BSE) set up by the British Government in 1988. In 1993–1994 he was the first head of the department of environmental sciences and policy at the Central European University in Budapest.

Southwood was also a contributing member of the Oxford Round Table, an interdisciplinary forum for the discussion of contemporary issues.

A portrait of Sir Richard Southwood hangs at Merton College, Oxford.

== Family ==
Sir Richard Southwood married, in 1955, Alison Langley (née Harden) whom he met at Rothamsted; Sir Richard and Lady Southwood had two sons and six grandchildren.

== Honours ==
- Knight Bachelor, United Kingdom (1984)
- Grand Officer of the Order of Merit, Portugal (April 27, 1993)
- British Naturalists' Association Peter Scott Memorial Award.

Academic offices
Preceded by Lord Neill of Bladen	Vice-Chancellor of Oxford University; 1989–1993	Succeeded by Sir Peter North
