= Rhodes Scholarship =

UK-based international postgraduate award

- Awarded for: Postgraduate study at the University of Oxford
- Sponsored by: Rhodes Trust
- Location: Oxford, England
- Established: 1902; 124 years ago
- Website: Official website

The Rhodes Scholarship is a British-based international postgraduate award for students to study at the University of Oxford in Oxford, United Kingdom. The scholarship is open to people from all backgrounds around the world.

Established in 1902, it is one of the oldest graduate scholarships in the world and one of the most prestigious international scholarship programmes. Its founder, Cecil John Rhodes, wanted to promote unity among English-speaking nations and instil a sense of civic-minded leadership and moral fortitude in future leaders, irrespective of their chosen career paths.

The scholarship committee selects candidates based on a combination of literary and academic achievements, athletic involvement, character traits like truth and courage, and leadership potential, originally assessed on a 200-point scale. In 2018, the criteria were revised to emphasize using one's talents and caring for others. The American Rhodes Scholarship is highly competitive, with an acceptance rate of around four percent in recent years, while other countries have varying rates. Scholars can study full-time postgraduate courses at Oxford for one to three years, receiving financial support for tuition and living expenses, along with access to Rhodes House facilities.

The Rhodes Scholarship has faced controversies since its inception, primarily concerning the exclusion of women and black Africans. Initially, the scholarship was limited to male students within the Commonwealth of Nations, Germany, and the United States, a restriction that only changed in 1977 following the passage of the Sex Discrimination Act. Protests for the inclusion of non-white scholars began in the 1970s, but it was not until 1991 that black South Africans were awarded the scholarship due to the political changes in the country. Additionally, criticism of Cecil Rhodes's colonialist legacy has spurred movements calling for a reevaluation of the scholarship and its ties to Rhodes's views. Critics have also highlighted the tendency of recipients to pursue careers in business rather than public service, diverging from the scholarship's original intent.

== History ==
=== Founding and motivation ===
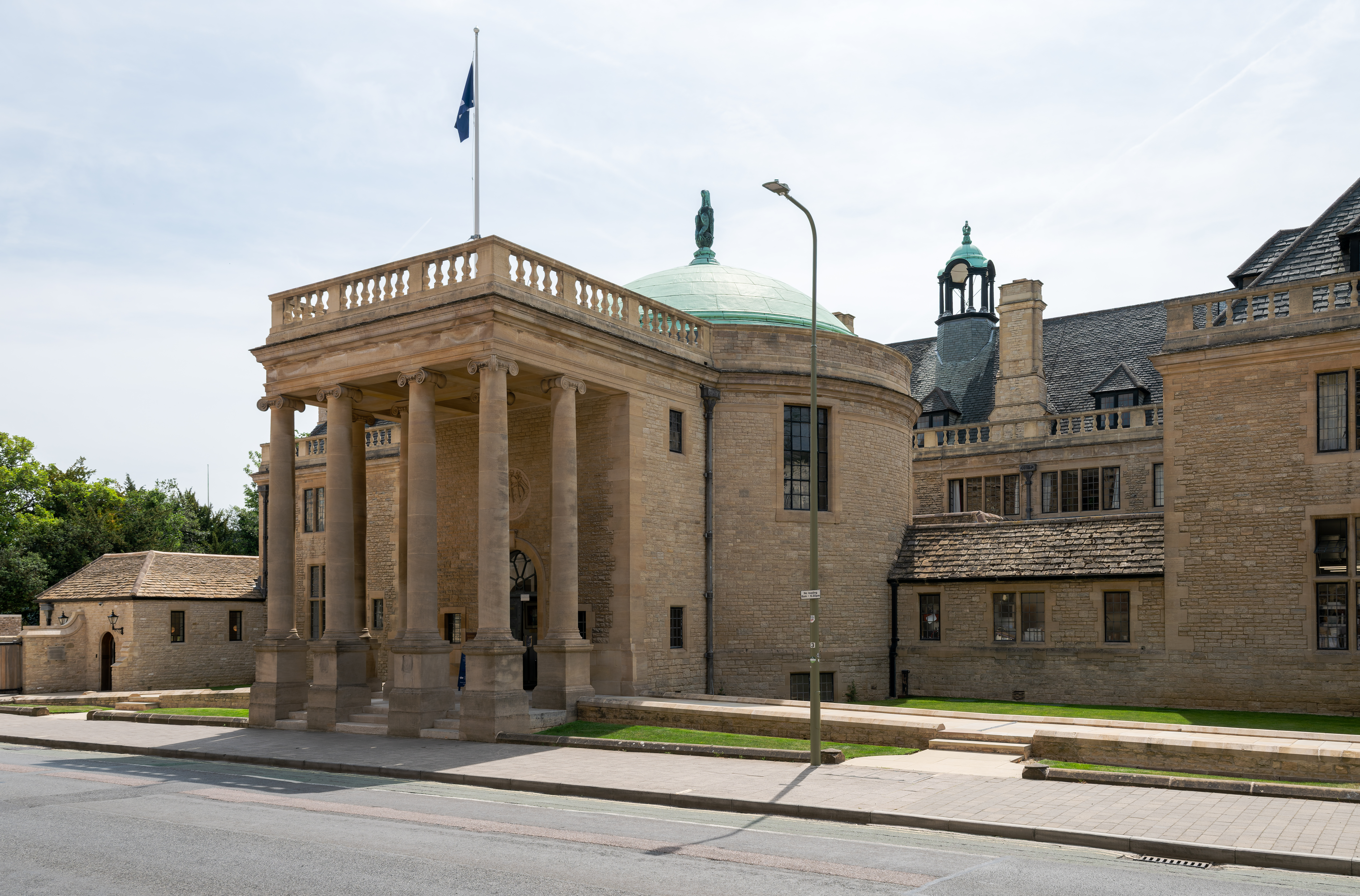
The Rhodes House at the University of Oxford in 2025.

Numerous international scholarship programmes were very much underway by 1900. Since the 1880s, governments, universities, and individuals in the settler colonies had been establishing travelling scholarships to home universities. By 1900, the travelling scholarship had become an important part of settler universities' educational visions. It served as a crucial mechanism by which they sought to claim their citizenship of what they saw as the expansive British academic world. The Rhodes programme was a copy of others that soon became the best-known version. The Rhodes Trust established the scholarships in 1902 under the terms laid out in the eighth and final will of Cecil John Rhodes, dated 1 July 1899 and appended by several codicils through March 1902.

The scholarships were founded for two reasons: to promote unity within the British empire, and to strengthen diplomatic ties between Britain and the United States of America. In Rhodes's own words, "I…desire to encourage and foster an appreciation of the advantages which I implicitly believe will result from the union of the English-speaking peoples throughout the world and to encourage in the students from North America who would benefit from the American Scholarships." Rhodes also bequeathed scholarships to German students in the hope that, "a good understanding between England, Germany and the United States of America will secure the peace of the world."

Rhodes, who attended Oriel College, Oxford, believed the university's residential colleges would be the best venue to nurture diplomatic ties between future world leaders.

To this day, controversies persist over Rhodes's Anglo-supremacist beliefs, most of which date back to his 1877 confession of faith. However, Rhodes's final will and testament states that "no student shall be qualified or disqualified for election…on account of his race or religious opinions".

The Rhodes Scholarships are administered and awarded by the Rhodes Trust, which is located at Rhodes House in Oxford. The trust has been modified by four acts of Parliament: the Rhodes Estate Act 1916, the Rhodes Trust Act 1929, the Rhodes Trust Act 1946; and most recently by the Rhodes Trust (Modification) Order 1976, a statutory instrument in accordance with Section 78 (4) of the Sex Discrimination Act 1975.

=== 20th century ===
In 1925, the Commonwealth Fund Fellowships (later renamed the Harkness Fellowships) were established to reciprocate the Rhodes Scholarships by enabling British graduates to study in the United States. The Kennedy Scholarship programme, created in 1966 as a memorial to John F. Kennedy, adopts a comparable selection process to the Rhodes Scholarships to allow ten British post-graduate students per year to study at either Harvard or the Massachusetts Institute of Technology (MIT). In 1953, the Parliament of the United Kingdom created the Marshall Scholarship as a coeducational alternative to the Rhodes Scholarship that would serve as a "living gift" to the United States.

Cecil Rhodes wished current scholars and Rhodes alumni (in the words of his will) to have "opportunities of meeting and discussing their experiences and prospects". This has been reflected, for example, in the initiation by the first warden (Sir Francis Wylie), of an annual warden's Christmas letter (now supplemented by Rhodes e-news and other communications); the creation of alumni associations in several countries, most prominently the Association of American Rhodes Scholars (which publishes The American Oxonian, founded in 1914, and oversees the Eastman Professorship); and the holding of reunions for Rhodes Scholars of all countries.

In recognition of the centenary of the foundation of the Rhodes Trust in 2003, four former Rhodes Scholars were awarded honorary degrees by the University of Oxford. These were John Brademas, Bob Hawke (Western Australia and University 1953), Rex Nettleford and David R. Woods. During the centenary celebrations, the foundation of the Mandela Rhodes Foundation was also marked.

=== 21st century ===
In 2013, during the 110th Rhodes anniversary celebrations, John McCall MacBain, Marcy McCall MacBain and the McCall MacBain Foundation donated £75 million towards the fundraising efforts of the Rhodes Trust.

In 2015, Rhodes Scholar R. W. Johnson published a critical account of the decline of the Rhodes Trust under its warden, John Rowett, and commended its recovery under wardens Donald Markwell and Charles R. Conn.

As of 2018, due to the introduction of the Global Rhodes Scholarships, the Rhodes Scholarship is open to postgraduate students from anywhere in the world. Many of its greatest scholars have carried out its founder's later ideal of "equal rights for all civilized men" becoming some of the foremost voices in human rights and social justice. Some have even engaged in criticism of Cecil Rhodes himself (see Rhodes must fall). Because access to further education, particularly post-graduate education, is linked with social mobility and racial wealth disparity, the scholarship (which is for post-graduate students) continues to attract criticism; however, the scholarship's recent partnership with the Atlantic Philanthropies is intended to help address those issues.

In 2019, University of Tennessee graduate Hera Jay Brown became the first transgender woman to be selected for a Rhodes Scholarship. Two non-binary scholars were also selected for the 2020 class.

== Selection and selectivity ==
=== Selection criteria ===
Since 2018, the same criteria Rhodes specified in his will underwent revision and has remained in place:

- literary and scholastic attainments
- energy to use one's talents to the full
- truth, courage, devotion to duty, sympathy for and protection of the weak, kindliness, unselfishness and fellowship
- moral force of character and instincts to lead, and to take an interest in one's fellow beings

Each country's scholarship varies in its selectivity. In the United States, applicants must first pass a university-internal endorsement process, then proceed to one of the 16 U.S. districts committees. In 2020, approximately 2,300 students sought their institution's endorsement for the American Rhodes scholarship, among those 953 from 288 institutions were university-endorsed, of whom 32 were ultimately elected. This represents a 1.4% award rate when considering both endorsed and non-endorsed applicants and a 3.4% award rate when considering endorsed applicants. As such, the American Rhodes Scholarship is more selective than the Churchill Scholarship, Truman Scholarship, Fulbright Scholarship, and Mitchell Scholarship. It is approximately as selective as the Gates Cambridge Scholarship, which has an award rate of 1.3%, and the Marshall Scholarship, which similarly receives around 1,000 university-endorsed applicants, of whom several dozen are ultimately elected. In Canada between 1997 and 2002, there were an average of 234 university-endorsed applicants annually for 11 scholarships, for an acceptance rate of 4.7%. In addition, Canadian provinces differ widely in the number of applications received, with Ontario receiving 58 applications on average for 2 spots (3.4%) and Newfoundland and Labrador receiving 18 applications for 1 spot (5.7%). According to the Rhodes Trust, the overall global acceptance rate stands at 0.7%, making it one of the most competitive scholarships in the world.

An early change was the elimination of the scholarships for Germany during the First and Second World Wars. No German scholars were chosen from 1914 to 1929, nor from 1940 to 1969. A change occurred in 1929, when an Act of Parliament established a fund separate from the original proceeds of Rhodes's will and made it possible to expand the number of scholarships. Between 1993 and 1995, scholarships were extended to other countries in the European Community.

=== Scholarship terms ===
Rhodes Scholars may study any full-time postgraduate course offered by the university, whether a taught master's programme, a research degree, or a second undergraduate degree (senior status). The scholarship's basic tenure is two years. However, it may also be held for one year or three years. Applications for a third year are considered during the course of the second year. University and college fees are paid by the Rhodes Trust. In addition, scholars receive a monthly maintenance stipend to cover accommodation and living expenses. Although all scholars become affiliated with a residential college while at Oxford, they also enjoy access to the publicly-accessible Rhodes House, an early 20th-century mansion with numerous public rooms, gardens, a library, study areas, and other facilities.

== Allocation of scholarships ==
Geographic constituency	2022 allocation	1902 allocation
Australia	9	6
Bermuda	1	1
Canada	11	2
Mainland China	4	—
East Africa	1	—
Germany	2	5
Hong Kong	2	—
India	5	—
Israel	2	—
Jamaica & the Commonwealth Caribbean	2	1
Kenya	2	—
Malaysia	1	—
Newfoundland	—	1
New Zealand	3	1
Pakistan	1	—
Singapore	1	—
Southern Africa	10	5
Syria, Jordan, Lebanon & Palestine	2	—
United Arab Emirates	2	—
United States	32	32
West Africa	2	—
Zambia & Zimbabwe (formerly Rhodesia)	2; 2 —	— — 3
Global scholarships	2	—
Total	101	57

There were originally 60 scholarships.

Four South African boys' schools were mentioned in Rhodes's will, each to receive an annual scholarship: the Boys High School in Stellenbosch (today known as Paul Roos Gymnasium); the Diocesan College (Bishops) in Rondebosch; the South African College Schools (SACS) in Newlands; and St Andrew's College in Grahamstown. These have subsequently been opened also to former students of their partner schools (girls' or co-educational schools).

During the ensuing 100 years, the trustees have added about another 40 scholarships at one time or another, though not all have continued. Some of these extended the scheme to Commonwealth countries not mentioned in the will. Very brief summaries of some of the terms and conditions can be found on the trust's website. Complete details can be obtained from the nominating countries.

As of 2018, scholars are selected from over 20 Rhodes constituencies (64 countries) worldwide. In 2015, the Rhodes Scholarship extended into new territories, first with the announcement of a number of scholarships for China, later with the announcement of one to two scholarships per year for the United Arab Emirates. The organization administering the scholarships is preparing to begin naming scholars from China. The move into China is the biggest expansion since women became eligible in the 1970s.

== Controversies ==
=== Exclusion of women ===
The Rhodes Scholarship was originally, as per the language used in Rhodes's will, open only to "male students." That stipulation did not change until 1977. Rhodes developed his scholarships partly through conversation with William Thomas Stead, editor of The Pall Mall Gazette and confidant of Rhodes, and at one time an executor of the will, who was stricken from the role when he objected to Rhodes's ill-fated effort to seize the Transvaal. Shortly after Rhodes's death, Stead implied in a published article about the will that he suggested that Rhodes open the scholarships to women, but Rhodes refused. Nothing more is said on the matter.

After his death, the will was under the control of the Board of Trustees of the Rhodes Trust. In 1916, however, the trustees introduced a bill into the House of Commons that, catering to popular British sentiment during the War, "revoked and annulled" the scholarships for Germans. Since then, legal control over the will has resided with Parliament.

In 1970, the trustees established the Rhodes Visiting Fellowships. Unlike the regular scholarship, a Visiting Fellow was expected to have a doctorate or comparable degree, and to use the two-year funded study to engage in independent research. Only 33 Visiting Fellowships were awarded.

In 1975, Parliament passed the Sex Discrimination Act of 1975 that banned discrimination based on sex, including in education. The trustees then applied to the Secretary of State for Education to admit women into the scholarship, and in 1976 the request was granted. In 1977, women were finally admitted to the full scholarship.

Before Parliament passed the 1975 Act, some universities protested against the exclusion of women by nominating female candidates, who were later disqualified at the state level of the American competition. In 1977, the first year women were eligible, 24 women (out of 72 total scholars) were selected worldwide, with 13 women and 19 men selected from the United States. Since then, the average female share of the scholarship in the United States has been around 35 percent.

In 2007, the Association of American Rhodes Scholars published a retrospective on the first 30 years of female recipients, many of whom individually recounted personal experiences as well as professional accomplishments.

In his 2008 book Legacy: Cecil Rhodes, the Rhodes Trust and Rhodes Scholarship published by Yale University Press, biographer and historian Philip Ziegler writes that "The advent of women does not seem notably to have affected the balance of Scholars among the various professions, though it has reduced the incidence of worldly success." Although it is true that female recipients have not become heads of state yet, they have succeeded in many other ways as described in the Rhodes Project.

In South Africa, the will of Cecil Rhodes expressly allocated scholarships to four all-male private schools. In 1992, one of the four schools partnered with an all-girls school in order to allow female applicants. In 2012, the three remaining schools followed suit to allow women to apply. Four of the nine scholarships allocated to South Africa are presently open only to students and alumni of these schools and partner schools.

=== Exclusion of black Africans ===
Beginning in 1970, scholars began protesting against the fact that all Rhodes Scholars from southern Africa were white, with 120 Oxford dons and 80 of the 145 Rhodes Scholars in residence at the time signing a petition calling for non-white scholars to be elected in 1971. The case of South Africa was especially difficult to resolve, because in his will establishing the scholarships, unlike for other constituencies, Rhodes specifically allocated four scholarships to alumni of four (formerly) white-only secondary schools. The other obstruction is that Rhodes's final will and testament explicitly states that "no student shall be qualified or disqualified for election…on account of his race or religious opinions".[6] According to Schaeper and Schaeper, the issue became "explosive" in the 1970s and 1980s as scholars argued that the scholarship be changed while the trustees argued they were powerless to change the will. Despite such protests, only in 1991 with the rise of the African National Congress did black South Africans begin to win the scholarships.

Out of five thousand Rhodes Scholarships awarded between 1903 and 1990, about nine hundred went to students from Africa.

=== Criticism of Rhodes as colonialist ===
Public criticism of the scholarship has also focused on Cecil Rhodes's white supremacist views. For example, in 1966, regional committees in interviews asked a white American candidate to assure them he would not publicly belittle the scholarship after he referred to its founding on "blood money". In 2015, a South African Rhodes Scholar, Ntokozo Qwabe, began a campaign to address Rhodes's controversial historical and political legacy, with a focus on Qwabe's own views which included such statements as "dismantling the open glorification of colonial genocide in educational and other public spaces – which makes it easy for British people to believe that these genocides were 'not that bad' – and props up the continuing structural legacies of British colonialism, neocolonialism, and ongoing imperialism".

Among other things, the campaign called for the removal of a statue of Rhodes from Oriel College and changes to Oxford's curriculum. While the college agreed to review the placement of the statue, the Chancellor of the university, Lord Patten, was critical of the accuracy of Qwabe's statements and warned against "pandering to contemporary views."

A group of Rhodes Scholars also created the group Redress Rhodes whose mission was to "attain a more critical, honest, and inclusive reflection of the legacy of Cecil John Rhodes" and to "make reparative justice a more central theme for Rhodes Scholars." Their demands include, among other things, shifting the Rhodes Scholarships awarded exclusively to previously all-white South African schools (rather than the at-large national pool), dedicating a "space at Rhodes House for the critical engagement with Cecil Rhodes's legacy, as well as imperial history", and ending a ceremonial toast Rhodes Scholars make to the founder. While the group does not have a position on the removal of the statue, its co-founder has called for the scholarship to be renamed as it is "the ultimate form of veneration and colonial apologism; it's a large part of why many continue to understand Rhodes as a benevolent founder and benefactor."

Public criticism has also focused on the alleged hypocrisy of applying for and accepting the Rhodes Scholarship while criticizing it, with University of Cambridge academic Mary Beard, writing in The Times Literary Supplement, arguing that Scholars "[could not] have your cake and eat it here: I mean you can't whitewash Rhodes out of history, but go on using his cash." Reacting to this criticism, Qwabe replied that "all that [Rhodes] looted must absolutely be returned immediately. I'm no beneficiary of Rhodes. I'm a beneficiary of the resources and labour of my people which Rhodes pillaged and slaved."

A group of 198 Rhodes Scholars of various years later signed a statement supporting Qwabe and arguing that there was "no hypocrisy in being a recipient of a Rhodes scholarship and being publicly critical of Cecil Rhodes and his legacy—a legacy that continues to alienate, silence, exclude and dehumanize in unacceptable ways. There is no clause that binds us to find 'the good' in Rhodes's character, nor to sanitize the imperialist, colonial agenda he propagated."

=== Criticism over recipients not entering public service ===
The tendency of a growing number of Rhodes Scholars to enter business or private law, as opposed to public service for which the scholarship was intended, has been a source of frequent criticism and "occasional embarrassment." Writing in 2009, the Secretary of the Rhodes Trust criticised the trend of Rhodes Scholars to pursue careers in finance and business, noting that "more than twice as many [now] went into business in just one year than did in the entire 1970s", attributing it to "grotesque" remuneration offered by such occupations. At least a half dozen 1990s Rhodes Scholars became partners at Goldman Sachs and, since the 1980s, McKinsey has had numerous Rhodes Scholars as partners. Similarly, of Rhodes Scholars who became attorneys, about one-third serve as staff attorneys for private corporations, while another third remain in private practice or academic posts.

According to Schaeper and Schaeper, "From 1904 to the present, the program's critics have had two main themes: first, that too many scholars were content with comfortable, safe jobs in academe, in law, and in business; second, that too few had careers in government or other fields where public service was the number-one goal." Andrew Sullivan wrote in 1988 that "of the 1,900 or so living American scholars…about 250 fill middle-rank administrative and professorial positions in middle-rank state colleges and universities…[while] another 260...have ended up as lawyers."

== Notable scholars and career trajectories ==
Surveying the history of the Rhodes Scholarship, Schaeper and Schaeper conclude that while "few of them have 'changed the world'…most of them have been a credit to their professions…and communities," finding that "the great majority of Rhodes Scholars have had solid, respectable careers." Eight former Rhodes scholars subsequently became heads of government or heads of state, including Bill Clinton (President of the United States), Norman Manley (Premier of Jamaica), Dom Mintoff (Prime Minister of Malta), John Turner (Prime Minister of Canada), Wasim Sajjad (President of Pakistan), and three Prime Ministers of Australia: Bob Hawke, Tony Abbott and Malcolm Turnbull.

From 1951 to 1997, 32% of American Rhodes Scholars pursued careers in education and academia, 20% in law, 15% in business, and 10% in medicine and science. Although Cecil Rhodes imagined that scholars would "pursue a full-time career in government…the number of scholars in local, state and federal government has remained at a steady 7 per cent" over the past century. Of the 200 or so scholars who have spent their careers in government, "most of them have had solid, but undistinguished careers," while "perhaps forty or more can be said to have had a significant, national impact in their particular areas."

The most popular career choice for Rhodes Scholars is education and academia, with many becoming deans of law and medical schools and others becoming professors and lecturers. Many of the most distinguished Rhodes Scholars, such as Zambian activist Lucy Banda, have become prominent members of the civil rights movement. In 1990, third-wave feminist author Naomi Wolf put forward ideas about beauty and power with her book The Beauty Myth, ushering in a new type of feminism that has risen to prominence in the digital age.

Rhodes Scholars have had a notable impact in the fields of medicine and science. Howard Florey was awarded a Rhodes Scholarship in 1922 after studying medicine at the University of Adelaide Medical School. In 1939 Florey, along with fellow scientist Ernst Boris Chain, led the team that successfully isolated and purified penicillin. Robert Q. Marston, an American Rhodes Scholar who studied with Florey, was Director of the National Institutes of Health (USA) from 1968 to 1973. He was credited with maintaining the high quality of basic science research in the Institutes.

=== Human rights, social justice and advocacy ===
==== Law ====
Challenging some of the convictions of the scholarship's founder is not a recent occurrence. As early as 1931, Afrikaner-born anti-apartheid lawyer and Rhodes Scholar Bram Fischer campaigned for equal rights for all South Africans. This led him to join the Communist Party of South Africa. Fischer was struck off the roll by the Johannesburg Bar Council in 1965 after he skipped bail on charges under the Suppression of Communism Act. He was later arrested and sentenced to life in prison. Other Rhodes Scholars have taken on difficult social causes with more success. Fred Paterson defended workers and unions at a reduced price, before he sat in the Queensland state parliament as the first and only Communist party member in Australian history. In 1978, former Rhodes Scholar Ann Olivarius sued Yale University over their mis-handling of on-campus sexual harassment complaints.

==== Education and child welfare ====
After leaving Oxford to write his first novel, former Rhodes Scholar Jonathan Kozol worked as a teacher in the Roxbury neighbourhood of Boston, Massachusetts. He would go on to write Death at an Early Age: The Destruction of the Hearts and Minds of Negro Children in the Boston Public Schools, after witnessing first-hand the devastating effect educational inequality was having on America. Rhodes Scholars Marc Kielburger and Roxanne Joyal conduct similar work with their organization Free the Children. Together they build schools and educate children in developing countries across Africa.

==== Civil and human rights ====
Much of the Rhodes alumni civil and human rights work has been focused in Africa, particularly South Africa. South African Justice Edwin Cameron initially focused his attention on law and employment law, but later worked in the field of LGBT rights as well as co-founding the Aids Consortium. Two-time Pulitzer Prize winning journalist Nick Kristof was pivotal in shedding light on atrocities such as Tiananmen Square and the Darfur genocide. Professor Sandra Fredman has also written extensively on anti-discrimination law, human rights law and labour law. Rhiana Gunn-Wright was the creator of the Green New Deal.

=== Medical innovation ===
==== Genetics ====
In 2014, Iranian Rhodes Scholar Pardis Sabeti used genome sequencing and computational genetics to identify the source of the Ebola outbreak in West Africa. She is also the front-person for indie-rock band Thousand Days.

Another Rhodes Scholar working in genome research is the mathematician and geneticist Eric Lander. His ideas in human genetics, particularly mapping and sequencing, led to the creation of The Cancer Genome Atlas.

==== Disease and epidemiology ====
Salim Yusuf, an Indian scholar, conducted significant research into heart health and its relationship to developing economies. He observed that shifts in the developing world, particularly dietary changes and increased urbanization, lead to higher incidences of heart attacks and strokes.

In Zimbabwe, A. Tariro Makadzange has researched perinatally infected children with HIV and HIV-positive adults with cryptococcal disease. Since graduating from Oxford, she has set up a new infectious disease laboratory at the University of Zimbabwe in Harare.

Sir Alimuddin Zumla, a British-Zambian, infectious diseases scholar declined an offer to take up the scholarship. Decades later, Zumla was recognized by Clarivate Analytics, Web of Science as one of the world's top 1% most cited researchers.

==== Surgery ====
After studying at Oxford, surgeon and author Atul Gawande became an advisor to Bill Clinton and the U.S. Department of Health and Human Services. In recent years he has devised an innovative checklist for a successful surgery. Other surgical innovations brought about by Rhodes Scholars include the GliaSite technique, a device that lowers the risks associated with radiation therapy in brain tumours.

A number of Rhodes scholars have gone on to careers in neurosurgery. One of the most influential neurosurgeons of all time, Wilder Penfield, was a Canadian Rhodes Scholar in 1915. Neurosurgeon Sir Hugh Cairns was a Rhodes Scholar for South Australia in 1917, whose treatment of Lawrence of Arabia led to research that informed the introduction of motorcycle helmets. Neurosurgeon Griffith Harsh was a Rhodes Scholar and created the GliaSite device.

=== Arts ===
==== Literature ====
One of the first recipients of the Rhodes Scholarship was the American poet, educator and critic John Crowe Ransom. He became a founding member of the influential Fugitive literary group. A contemporary of Ransom's who also became a Rhodes Scholar was Robert Penn Warren. Warren was lambasted by his peers who told him that the study of English literature was a soft option; seeking to rebut such attacks, he introduced new critical ideas into the study of poetry and fiction, and these ideas went on to change how literature was taught at undergraduate and postgraduate levels, not only in America itself. Tasmanian Rhodes Scholar Richard Flanagan (Tasmania and Worcester, 1984) is a celebrated author, having been awarded the Man Booker Prize in 2014 for his novel The Narrow Road to the Deep North.

==== Hip-hop ====
In 2006, lawyer and current Lieutenant Governor of New York Antonio Delgado critiqued capitalism and racial injustice under the name "AD the Voice."

Roughly 90 years previously, the phrase "keeping it real" was used by Rhodes scholar Alain Locke in his book The New Negro to describe the pursuit of in the face of mainstream media's portrayal of African American culture. Locke's work inspired the Harlem Renaissance movement, and "keeping it real" has since become a universally recognized hip-hop ethos.

=== Science and technology ===
==== Space exploration ====
After studying ion propulsion at Oxford, Jennifer Gruber embarked on a career as a space engineer. She is currently coordinating missions between the Johnson Space Center and the International Space Station as an employee of NASA.

==== Cosmology ====
Rhodes Scholar Brian Greene co-founded ISCAP, Columbia's Institute for Strings, Cosmology, and Astroparticle Physics. As well as winning a Pulitzer Prize for non-fiction, Greene made some ground-breaking discoveries in the field of superstring theory and was one of the cosmologists to co-develop superstring theory.

== Comparison to other post-graduate scholarships ==
The Rhodes Scholarship model has inspired successor scholarships in many countries. These include:

- The Kennedy Scholarship for British nationals to study at Harvard University or the Massachusetts Institute of Technology (1964)
- The international Yenching Scholarship for study at Peking University (2015)
- The international Schwarzman Scholarship for study at Tsinghua University (2016)
- The international Knight-Hennessy Scholars to study at Stanford University (2018)
- The international McCall MacBain Scholars to study at McGill University (2019)

In structure and selection criteria, the scholarship is similar to the John Monash Scholarship, Schwarzman Scholarship, Knight-Hennessy Scholarship, Weidenfeld-Hoffmann Scholarship and Leadership Program, Gates Cambridge Scholarship, Marshall Scholarship, Yenching Scholarship, Fulbright Program, Erasmus Mundus Scholarship, and Chevening Scholarship. As with the Rhodes, the Gates Cambridge, Yenching, Knight-Hennessy, and Schwarzman scholarships are tenable at only one university. The Knight-Hennessy and Schwarzman Scholarships similarly award scholarships to students from all nations, with a focus on public service and leadership.

The Rhodes Scholarship is most closely associated with the Marshall Scholarship, with university fellowship offices often preparing applicants for both concurrently. The founders of the Marshall in 1953 initially considered partnering with the Rhodes and even considered using the same selection committees, but this idea was disregarded because the Marshall proponents believed the scholarships should be available to women, and to married men under the age of 28; at the time, the Rhodes Scholarship was limited to single men under the age of 25. Some highlight a longstanding rivalry between the two since the Marshall was established, with the Rhodes historically perceived as more "athletic" and the Marshall "more intellectual", though the distinctions between them today are negligible. When he applied for the Rhodes and Marshall Scholarships, 1959 Marshall Scholar Stephen Breyer "made a frustrating and ultimately unsuccessful attempt to crew at Stanford in order to fulfil the Rhodes scholarship's athletic requirement."

== See also ==
- Clarendon Scholarship
- John Behan
- Commonwealth Scholarship and Fellowship Plan
- Marshall Scholarship
- Fulbright Program
- Gates Cambridge Scholarship
- Knight-Hennessy Scholars
- Jardine Scholarship
- List of Rhodes Scholars
- Rise (education program)
- Thouron Award
- McCloy Academic Scholarship Program
