= Nadia Schadlow =

American government official (born 1965)

2nd United States Deputy National Security Advisor for Strategy
- In office January 21, 2018 – April 27, 2018
- President: Donald Trump
- Preceded by: Dina Powell
- Succeeded by: Vacant

Personal details
- Born: 1965 (age 60–61)
- Party: Republican
- Education: Cornell University (BA); Johns Hopkins University (MA, PhD)

Nadia Catherine Schadlow (born c. 1965) is an American academic and defense-related government officer who briefly served in 2018 as Assistant to the President and Deputy National Security Advisor for Strategy in the first Trump Administration. She is the primary author of the 2017 National Security Strategy (NSS).

== Early life, education and family ==
Schadlow grew up in Bedford Hills, New York. She holds a B.A. degree in government and Soviet studies from Cornell University and M.A. and Ph.D. degrees from the Paul H. Nitze School of Advanced International Studies (SAIS) at Johns Hopkins University, supervised by Eliot A. Cohen. She has three children.

== Political positions ==
Schadlow has been described as a neoconservative.

== Early government career ==
Schadlow started as a civil servant at the Department of Defense focusing on the Soviet Union and the newly independent Ukraine within the Office of the Secretary of Defense. Later, she served on the Defense Policy Board from September 2006 to June 2009.

== Academic career ==
Schadlow is a full member of the Council on Foreign Relations. Her articles have appeared in Parameters, The American Interest, the Wall Street Journal, The Atlantic, and Philanthropy, and she has written chapters for several edited volumes. She is author of the book, War and the Art of Governance: Consolidating Combat Success Into Political Victory, which looks at cases in which militaries are involved in non-military governance activities.

At the Smith Richardson Foundation, she was a senior program officer for the International Security and Foreign Policy Program before joining the National Security Council.

== National Security Council ==
Schadlow was appointed to the National Security Council staff by long-time colleague H.R. McMaster in March 2017. Upon her appointment, journalist Thomas E. Ricks described both her and Fiona Hill, who joined the NSC at the same time, as "well-educated, skeptical, and informed..." During this time, Schadlow became the primary author of the 2017 National Security Strategy (NSS). Her work on the document and the inter-agency process that preceded it were well received by foreign policy experts across the political spectrum. About a year later, Schadlow would comment that the NSS had "achieved the state of mattering".

Schadlow was chosen to replace Dina Powell as deputy national security advisor in January 2018, although her tenure was brief. After John R. Bolton replaced McMaster as National Security Advisor on April 9, 2018, it was announced that Schadlow would resign effective April 27. Her departure was seen as part of a larger "cleaning house" that Bolton undertook upon appointment.

== Post-NSC career ==
Following her resignation from the NSC, she joined the Hudson Institute as a Senior Fellow and became a Fellow at Schmidt Futures. She is also a visiting fellow at Mitre Corporation and the Hoover Institution. Schadlow is also an Advisory Board Member of Spirit of America. She serves on the Special Competitive Studies Project's (SCSP) board of advisors. The SCSP was formed in October 2021 by Eric Schmidt to continue the work of the National Security Commission on Artificial Intelligence after its final report was filed. She is also co-chair of the Hudson Institute's Hamilton Commission on Securing America's National Security Innovation Base. Schadlow serves on the board of the National Endowment for Democracy as well as the Reagan Institute's Task Force on 21st Century National Security Technology and Workforce. She is also a member of the Krach Institute for Tech Diplomacy at Purdue.
