= Climate change in Rhode Island =

Climate change in the US state of Rhode Island

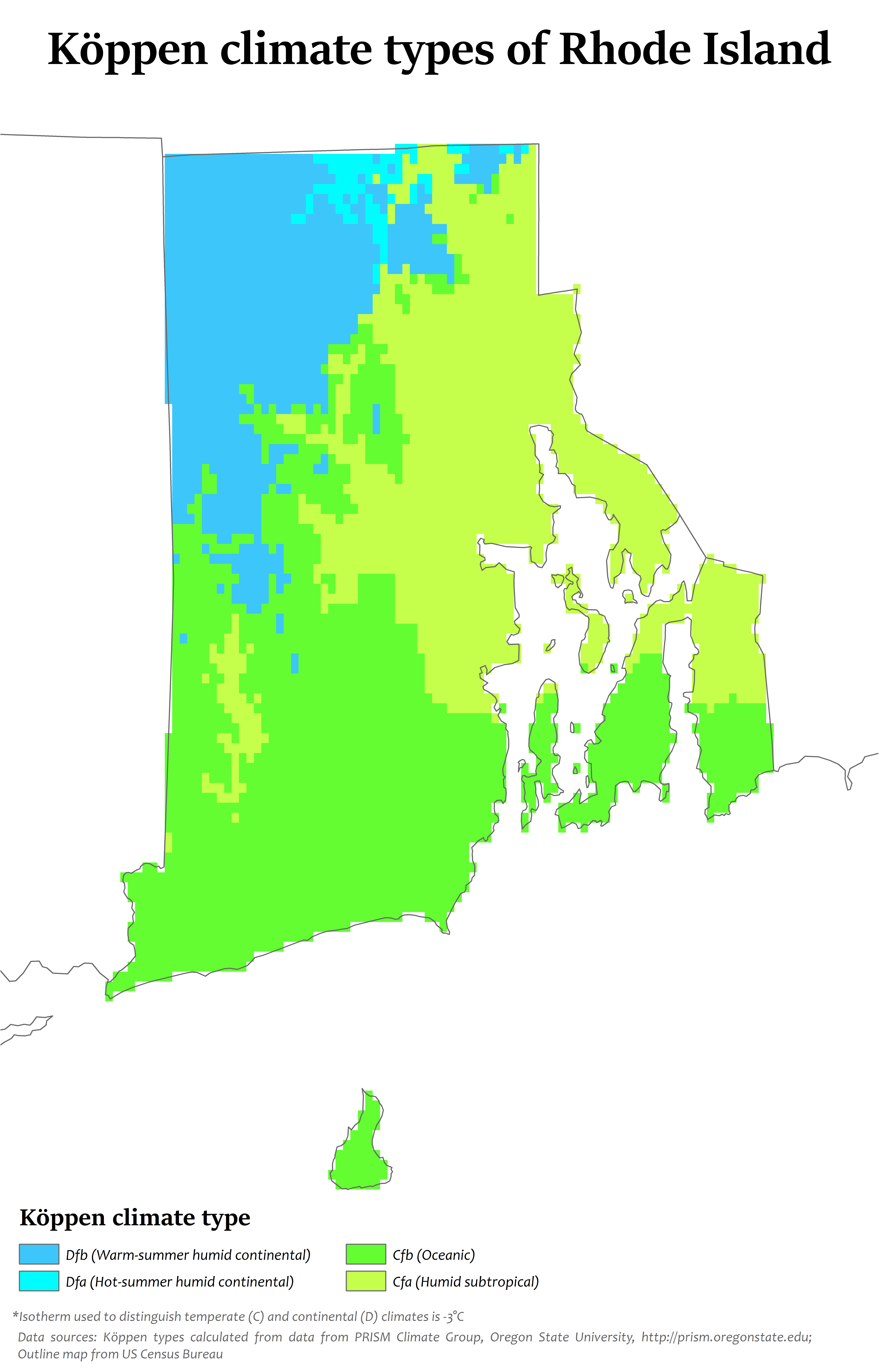
Köppen climate types in Rhode Island, showing that the state is now divided between oceanic, humid subtropical, and warm-summer humid continental climate types.

Climate change in Rhode Island encompasses the effects of climate change, attributed to man-made increases in atmospheric carbon dioxide, in the U.S. state of Rhode Island.

Climate change in Rhode Island affects several systems, including fishing, agriculture and wetland loss. Rhode Island has joined some multistate programs to address climate change.

The United States Environmental Protection Agency reports that Rhode Island's climate has warmed about three degrees Fahrenheit since 1900.

== Temperature and precipitation impacts ==
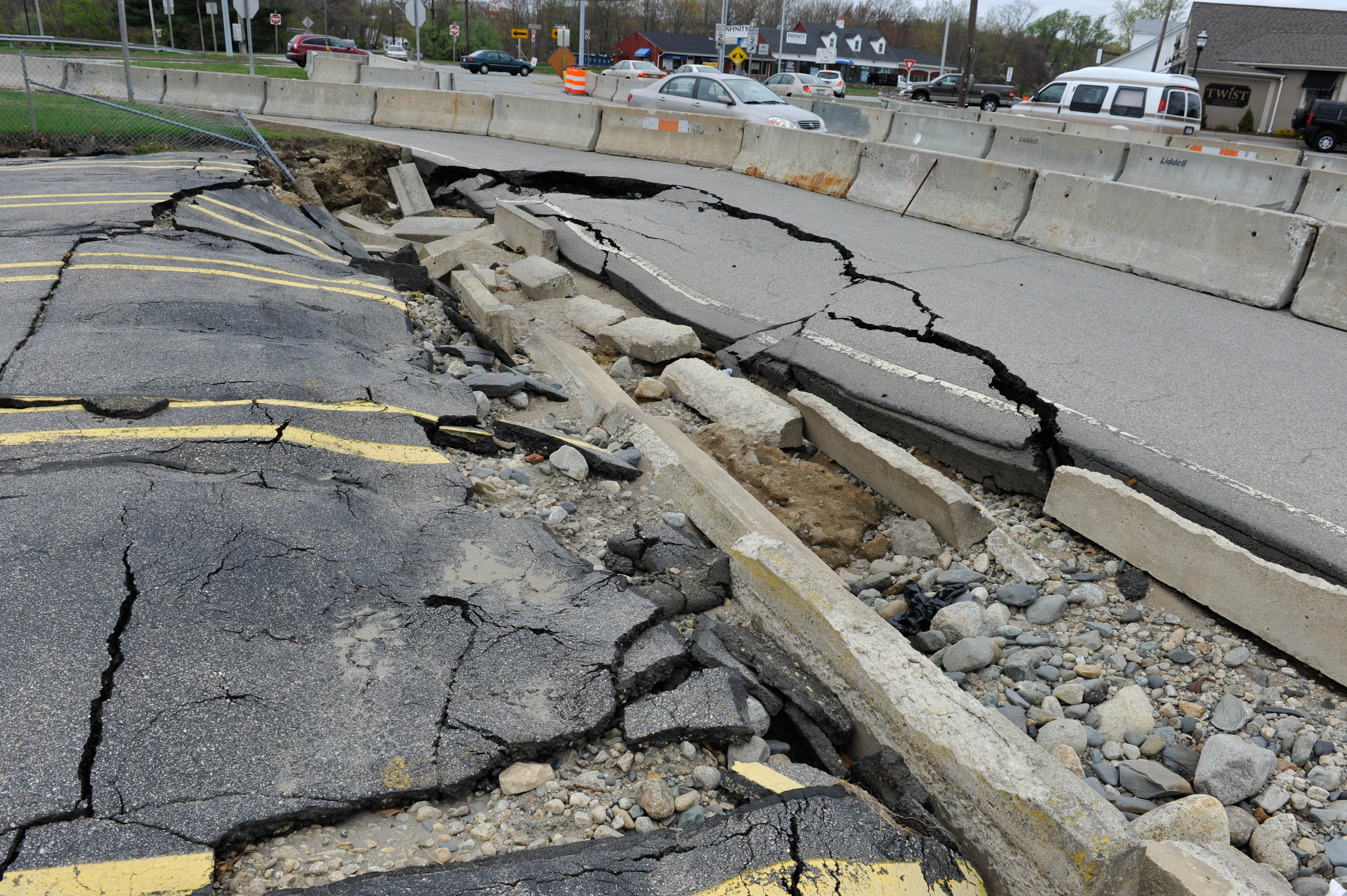
Flood damage, Warwick, 2010

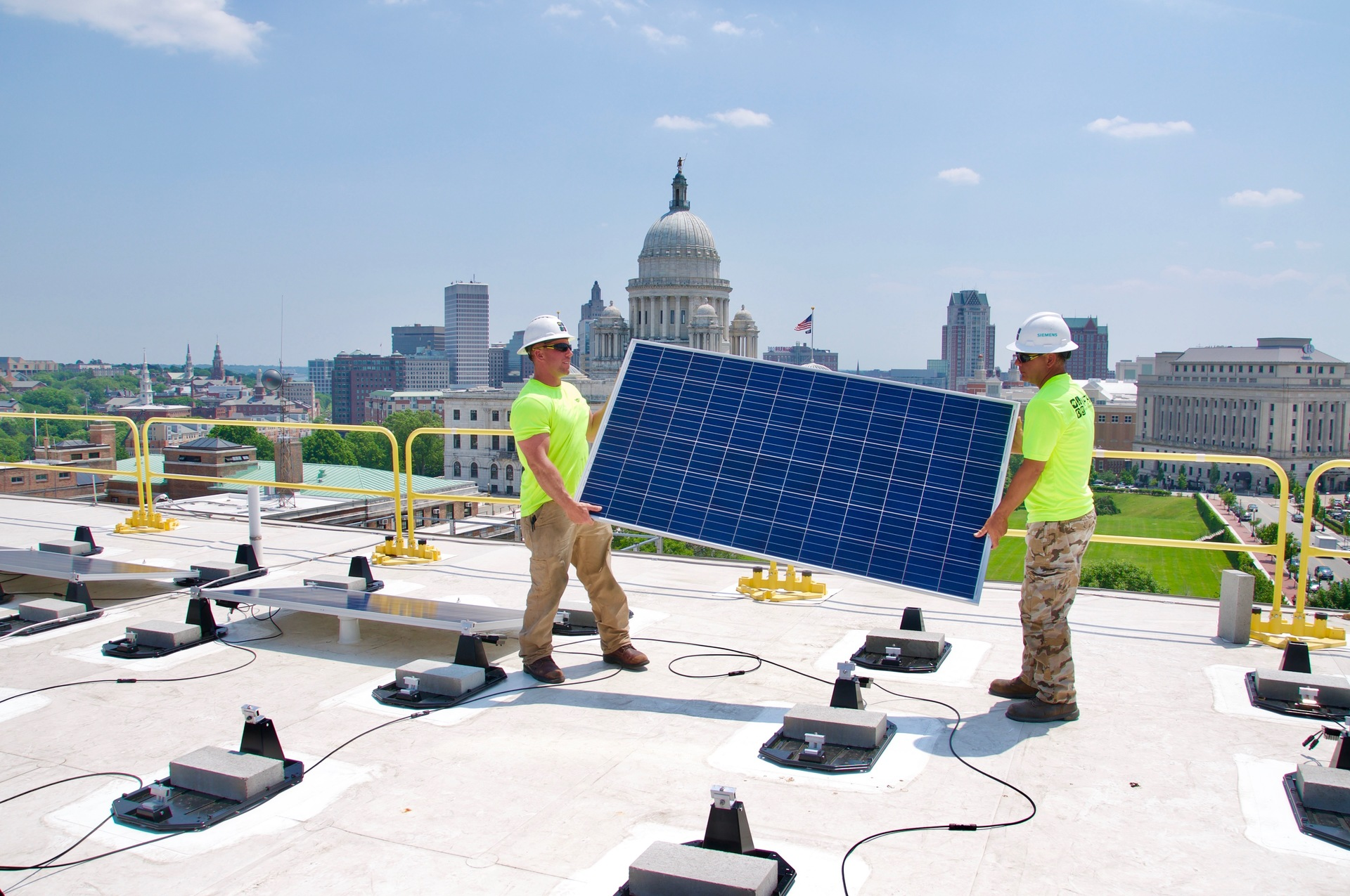
Solar panel installation, Providence

"Rising temperatures and shifting rainfall patterns are likely to increase the intensity of both floods and droughts. Average annual precipitation in the Northeast increased 10 percent from 1895 to 2011, and precipitation from extremely heavy storms has increased 70 percent since 1958. During the next century, average annual precipitation and the frequency of heavy downpours are likely to keep rising. Average precipitation is likely to increase during winter and spring, but not change significantly during summer and fall. Rising temperatures will melt snow earlier in spring and increase evaporation, and thereby dry the soil during summer and fall. So flooding is likely to be worse during winter and spring, and droughts worse during summer and fall".

Due to increases in temperatures, Rhode Island experienced "uncomfortably warm" weather in 2015 to 2016, three weeks longer than in the 1950s. This may lead to hundreds of additional heat-related ER visits per year in Rhode Island (an increase between 6.8 and 25%, depending on emissions levels).

== Ecosystems ==
"Changing climate threatens ecosystems by disrupting relationships between species. Wildflowers and woody perennials are blooming—and migratory birds are arriving—sooner in spring. Not all species adjust in the same way, however, so the food that one species needs may no longer be available when that species arrives on its migration. Warmer temperatures allow deer populations to increase, leading to a loss of forest underbrush, which makes some animals more vulnerable to predators. Rising temperatures also enable invasive species to move into areas that were previously too cold".

== Sea level rise, wetland loss, and coastal flooding ==
"Rising sea level erodes wetlands and beaches and increases damage from coastal storms. Tidal wetlands are inherently vulnerable because of their low elevations, and shoreline development prevents them from migrating inland onto higher ground. Human activities such as filling wetlands have destroyed about one third of New England’s coastal wetlands since the early 1800s. Wetlands provide habitat for many bird species, such as osprey and heron, as well as several fish species. Losing coastal wetlands would harm coastal ecosystems and remove an important line of defense against coastal flooding. Coastal cities and towns will become more vulnerable to storms in the coming century as sea level rises, shorelines erode, and storm surges become higher. Storms can destroy coastal homes, wash out highways and rail lines, and damage essential communication, energy, and wastewater management infrastructure".

Based on projections by Climate Central, a New Jersey–based research group, sea level rise and flooding is particularly concerning in Rhode Island due to the pattern of development in the state. Housing is built in flood zones at a higher rate than in other areas. Further, many historic districts are at low elevations.

== Fishing and agriculture ==
"Parts of Rhode Island's fishing and farming sectors may suffer as climate changes. Rising water temperatures can lower oxygen levels and otherwise alter freshwater and marine ecosystems. Some fish such as bass may flourish in the Northeast's warming waters, but key ocean fisheries, such as cod and lobster south of Cape Cod, are expected to decline. The loss of coastal wetlands could harm commercially important fish and shellfish, such as bass and clams. Climate change may also pose challenges for agriculture: Some farms may be harmed if more hot days and droughts reduce crop yields, or if more flooding and wetter springs delay their planting dates. Other farms may benefit from a longer growing season and the fertilizing effect of carbon dioxide".

== State policy ==
Rhode Island participates in the Northeastern Regional Greenhouse Gas Initiative, an effort to reduce carbon dioxide emissions in the power sector through a market-based program.

In December 2019, Rhode Island joined consideration for a multi-state gasoline cap-and-trade program. The plan aims to reduce transportation-related tailpipe emissions, and would levy a tax on fuel companies based on carbon dioxide emissions. The most ambitious version of the plan is projected to reduce the area's tailpipe emissions by 25% between 2022 and 2032. The program is in the public comment phase, with individual states determining whether to participate. The program could begin as early as 2022. In July 2024, a state agency co-received a $450 million federal grant for "community-driven solutions to cut climate pollution across New England," the US EPA announced. The Rhode Island Office of Energy Resources was in a coalition selected by EPA to receive the Climate Pollution Reduction Grant to address the climate crisis, upgrade air quality, and bolster environmental justice efforts.

== Business action ==
Providence Water, Rhode Island's largest water utility, started an exploratory venture to evaluate whether assisted migration of southern species to Rhode Island could stave off the forest loss, erosion, and subsequent disruption of water sources caused by climate change. The utility manages a 20 square mile woodland, in which nonlocal species are being brought in.

== See also ==
- Plug-in electric vehicles in Rhode Island
