= Schmidt Science Fellows =

Postdoctoral fellowship

- Key people: Eric Schmidt; Wendy Schmidt
- Website: schmidtsciencefellows.org

Schmidt Science Fellows is a STEM postdoctoral fellowship awarded annually since 2018 by Schmidt Futures, in partnership with the Rhodes Trust. Former Google chairman and chief executive officer Eric Schmidt, and his wife Wendy Schmidt, fund the fellowship award.

== Structure ==
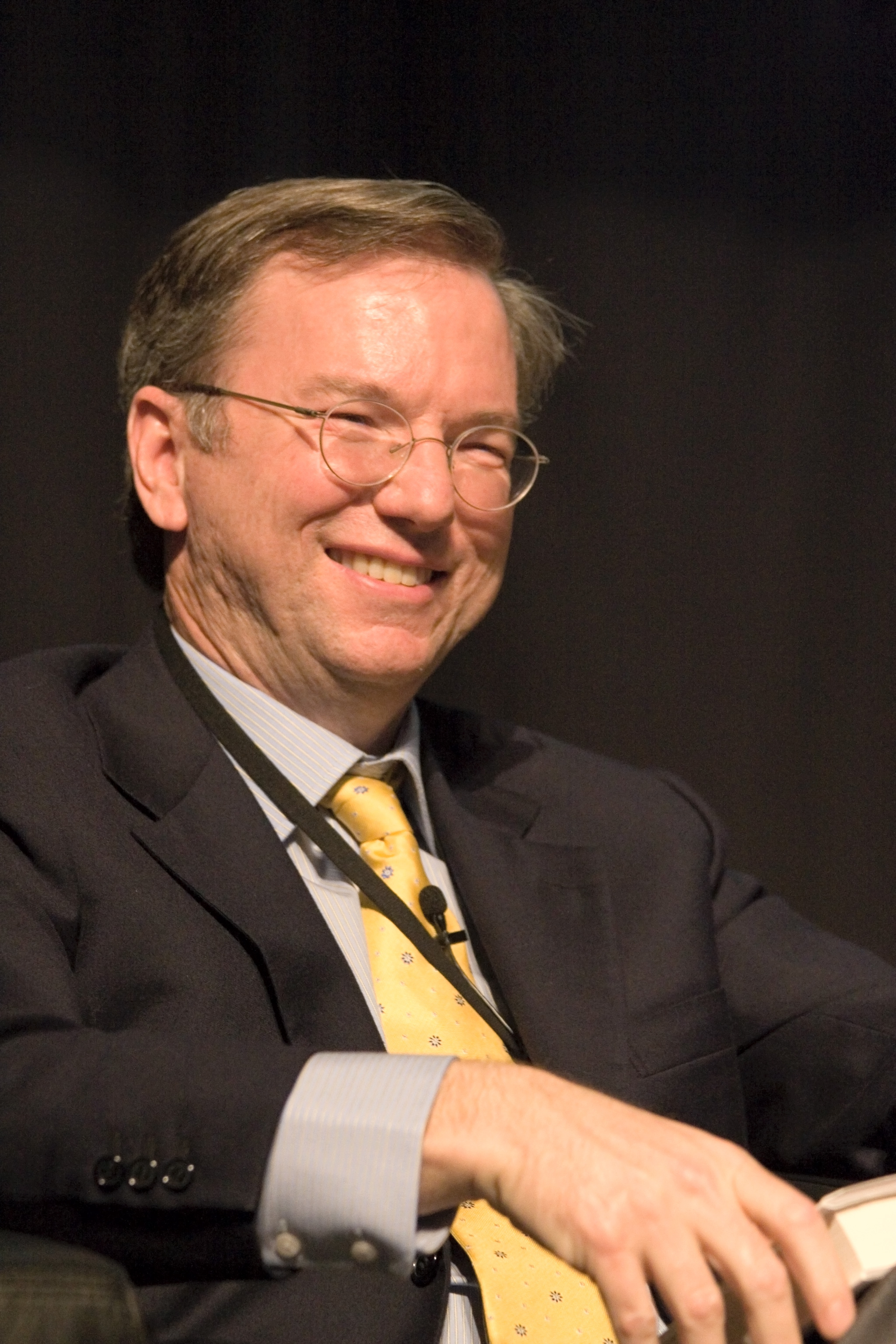
Former Google chief executive office and chairman Eric Schmidt sponsors the program along with his wife Wendy Schmidt

The fellowship is supported by Schmidt Futures, the philanthropic initiative of Eric Schmidt and Wendy Schmidt, who pledged $25 million for the first three years as part of a broader $100 million drive to fund scientific research. The program has Dr. Megan Kenna as the executive director and Professor Sir Keith Burnett as the chair of the academic council.

== Selection and placements ==
The program invites a select group of the world's leading science and engineering institutions to nominate their "most exceptional" PhD students. Nominees then submit an application, consisting of a research proposal, a personal statement, current CV, and 4-7 recommendation letters. The stated selection criteria are extraordinary achievement, extraordinary degree of intelligence, scientific curiosity and innovation, collaborative spirit, leadership, and an ambition for social good.

== See also ==
- Schmidt Family Foundation
