= Rise (education program) =

Rise is a training, funding and mentorship network created by Eric and Wendy Schmidt’s Schmidt Futures initiative and the Rhodes Trust. Its founders created the programme to identify talented students aged 15-17 who come from any geography around the world and are interested in service and leadership. The scheme aims to develop these young people through scholarships, mentoring, funding and a residential programme.

== Background ==
The Schmidts' relationship with the Rhodes Trust came about in 2017, and initially, the couple committed $25 million over three years to establish the post-doctoral Schmidt Science Fellows program. In 2019, the couple pledged a further $1 billion to talent causes on an international level.

== Program ==
In recent years, talent has become a primary theme of the Schmidts’ philanthropy, and the couple began financing projects which develop talented people, and networks to support those people.

Upon launching the Rise program, Dr Elizabeth Kiss, the current CEO of the Rhodes Trust, stated, “All the research indicates 15 to 17 is… a pivotal time for self-understanding, brain plasticity, and a moment when you can make all the difference in a person’s trajectory.”

The website for Schmidt Futures states that before their final year of high school participants will be invited to attend a residential fellowship. Participants will also receive other opportunities, including scholarship funding, mentorship and career services.

== See also ==
- Schmidt Science Fellows
- Rhodes Scholarship
