= Rest of World =

Non-profit news organization and website

- Website type: Technology News
- Available in: English
- Country of origin: United States
- Area served: Worldwide
- Owner: Rest of World Media Inc.
- Founder: Sophie Schmidt
- Editor: Anup Kaphle (Editor in Chief)
- Key people: Sophie Schmidt; Anup Kaphle; Raju Narisetti
- Employees: 30
- Website: restofworld.org
- Advertising: No
- Commercial: No
- Registration: Optional
- Launched: 2020 (6 years ago)
- Current status: Active

Rest of World (stylized rëşt ộf wŏrld) is an American nonprofit publication covering technology stories outside western countries. Launched in 2020 by Sophie Schmidt, Rest of World focuses on the impact of technology in "glossed over" emerging consumer markets outside the developed West. The publication is primarily funded by the Schmidt Family Foundation.

On October 26, 2026, the outlet announced it would cease publishing as a standalone entity at the end of January 2027.

== History ==
Rest of World was first announced in May 2019 by Sophie Schmidt, daughter of former Google CEO, Eric Schmidt, and Wendy Schmidt, as a publication about the impact of technology on the non-Western world, particularly in Africa, Asia, and Latin America. The news website is operated by Rest of World Media Inc., an American private operating foundation established in April 2019. The organization's operations are funded through multiple sources, including grants from foundations such as the Schmidt Family Foundation, donations and sponsorships.

Rest of World was launched in May 2020. That year, Anup Kaphle, a journalist who previously worked for The Washington Post, BuzzFeed News and The Kathmandu Post, joined Rest of World as its founding executive editor. As of September 2020, Rest of World had 30 employees, with about 20 being full-time staffers.

In January 2025, Maryam Saleh, previously an editor for The Intercept, joined Rest of World as its first Investigations Editor.

== Awards and recognition ==
Rest of World has received awards and recognition for its reporting, design, and visual journalism from organizations including the American Society of Magazine Editors, the Online News Association, the Edward R. Murrow Awards, the Society of Publishers in Asia, and the Society for News Design.

In 2024, the publication won a National Magazine Award for design from the American Society of Magazine Editors.

Rest of World was also the winner for the 2024 Online Journalism Awards in the category for Topical Reporting: Race, Ethnicity, Gender and Identity, Small Newsroom.

== Operation ==
=== News operation ===
Rest of World's office is located in New York City, while most of its reporters are in Berlin, Hong Kong, Bangalore and other international locations. They also rely on a network of freelance journalists from around the globe.

=== Rest of World Media, Inc. ===
Rest of World Media, Inc. is a 501(c)(3) private operating foundation established in April 2019 and incorporated in the state of Delaware as a nonprofit, charitable corporation. The foundation has one subsidiary, Rest of World Media International, LLC, formed in January 2020 and registered in Kenya as a foreign company. Its purpose is to employ editorial staff.

Rest of World has received numerous grants from notable organizations such as the Schmidt Family Foundation, Ford Foundation, Henry Luce Foundation, and Luminate – an entity operated by the Omidyar Group.

Sophie Schmidt said in September 2020 that she would be spending $60 million on Rest of World over the next decade, with no plans to sell advertising or to use a subscription model. She said she might bring in another investor.

=== Announced closure ===
On October 26, 2026, Semafor reported that founder Sophie Schmitt had emailed Rest of World's donors to explain that it has “begun the search for a new institutional home.” Rest of World's Deputy Editor Rina Chandran posted on LinkedIn the same day that the outlet was "shutting down" as leadership "search[ed] for a new home for the publication," and that it would continue publishing through the end of January 2027.

== Coverage ==
Schmidt said in September 2020, "There are three or four billion people who live in markets that are deemed not important enough to address, so there is just a huge gap in understanding what is going on in the rest of the world." Kaphle said in November 2021, "We believe there's a significant gap in how the story of technology is told today — how many thousands of tech companies, apps and experiences with tech go unreported in Western press — so our goal is to fill that gap with compelling, immersive, and high-quality journalism."

Rest of World maintains partnerships with international news outlets such as India's The Caravan and Mexico's Animal Político. It has extensively covered the electric vehicle revolution, the gig economy, Chinese technology companies, and artificial intelligence in global markets.

The publication won a 2024 National Magazine Award in the design category, for articles on innovative non-western companies, Chinese shopping platforms, and how AI stereotypes different nationalities. That year, Rest of World launched an AI Elections Tracker to examine the role AI plays in elections worldwide.

== See also ==
- Institute for Nonprofit News (member)
- Sophie Schmidt (founder)
