= Anup Kaphle =

Nepalese journalist

- Education: Tusculum University; Columbia University
- Occupation: Journalist
- Title: Editor-in-chief at Rest of World
- Board member of: Rest of World

Anup Kaphle is a Nepali journalist who is currently the editor-in-chief of Rest of World, an online publication that focuses on technology. Kaphle has previously worked for The Atlantic, The Washington Post, BuzzFeed News and has led The Kathmandu Post as editor-in-chief.

== Early life and education ==
Kaphle grew up in the Nepali city of Pokhara. He moved to the capital city of Kathmandu, where he interned at The Himalayan Times in 2003. Later that year, Kaphle moved to the United States to pursue an undergraduate degree at Tusculum University in Tennessee. After graduating in 2007 with a degree in English, Kaphle went on to attend the Columbia University Graduate School of Journalism in New York City. He is also a graduate of the Bard Globalization and International Affairs Program in New York City.

== Career ==
During his time at Tusculum, Kaphle interned for Newsweek and Forbes.com. After graduating from Columbia University, Kaphle worked for News21 in Arizona before going to work as a digital media fellow at The Atlantic in 2008. As a correspondent for The Atlantic, Kaphle reported from Afghanistan and Nepal.

In 2009, Kaphle left The Atlantic for The Washington Post, where he initially worked as an online producer. After three years, in 2011, Kaphle was promoted digital foreign editor at the Post. He remained in the position until April 2015. Kaphle then moved to London as deputy foreign editor at Buzzfeed News.

In March 2018, Kaphle was named executive editor of the digital food and travel publication Roads & Kingdoms. Kaphle left the publication in 2018 to move back to his home country of Nepal to lead The Kathmandu Post.

Kaphle resigned in February 2020 to move back to the United States. He is currently executive editor of Rest of World, a non-profit digital publication founded by Sophie Schmidt, an entrepreneur and daughter of Eric Schmidt, former executive chairman of Google.

== Awards ==
- Henry N. Taylor Award, Columbia University Graduate School of Journalism, 2008
- The Eugene Meyer Award, The Washington Post, 2012
