= Ylli Bajraktari =

President and CEO of the Special Competitive Studies Project

- Born: Kosovo
- Education: B.A. in International Relations (George Washington University); MPP (Harvard University)
- Known for: President and CEO of Special Competitive Studies Project

Ylli Bajraktari is an American national security policy expert who serves as President and CEO of the Special Competitive Studies Project (SCSP).

== Early life ==
Bajraktari was born in Kosovo and emigrated to the United States after the war. He holds a B.A. degree in International Relations from the George Washington University and an MPP from Harvard University.

== Career ==
Originally joining the Department of Defense in 2010, Bajraktari served in the Office of the Undersecretary for Policy as a country director for Afghanistan and later as a country director for India. Bakraktari served as Chief of Staff to the National Security Advisor LTG H.R. McMaster during the first Trump administration. He departed the National Security Council when McMaster did. From 2019 to 2021, he served as the executive director of the U.S. National Security Commission on Artificial Intelligence (NSCAI), chaired by Eric Schmidt. He subsequently joined the Special Competitive Studies Project (SCSP). Bajraktari was a distinguished visiting research fellow at the National Defence University's Institute for National Strategic Studies.

In 2023, Bajraktari delivered a keynote address at the RIT Kosovo commencement ceremony.

He is a contributor to several DC-based and national security publications, including Foreign Policy.

== Awards ==
- Department of Defense Distinguished Civilian Service Award
