= Schmidt Family Foundation =

American private foundation

The Schmidt Family Foundation
- Now discontinued logo of Schmidt Family Foundation's operation
- Formation: 2006 (20 years ago)
- Founder: Eric Schmidt; Wendy Schmidt
- Type: 501(c)(3) tax exempt private foundation
- Tax ID no.: 20-4170342
- Location: Palo Alto, California, United States
- President: Wendy Schmidt
- Affiliations: Schmidt Sciences; Schmidt Ocean Institute; 11th Hour Racing; Remain
- Revenue: $105,150,835 (2021)
- Expenses: $124,965,500 (2021)
- Website: theschmidtfamilyfoundation.org

The Schmidt Family Foundation is a private foundation created in 2006 by Eric Schmidt, the executive chairman of Google, and his wife Wendy Schmidt, to address issues pertaining to sustainability and the responsible use of natural resources.

== History and assets ==
The foundation was established in 2006 by Eric and Wendy Schmidt, with assets valued at over $1 billion, which included $307 million in Google Class A stock.

== Focus area ==
The foundation is focused on the application of new knowledge and innovation and advancement original research in science, energy, and biosphere sustainability, often in collaboration with other organizations. Its initial specific focus areas are environmental preservation and education.

== Programs and grants ==
Since 2006, the Foundation has made grants to organizations, including the Energy Foundation, the California Academy of Sciences, the Regeneration Project, the Columbia Center for Children’s Environmental Health, Green for All, Grist magazine, the Center for Investigative Reporting, the Environmental Media Association, and the Precourt Institute for Energy at Stanford University.

Between 2006 and 2011, it made a five-year grant of $1 million per year to the Natural Resources Defense Council.

It has supported several Schmidt family projects. In 2010, it made a $1 million grant to the Marine Science and Technology Foundation, a private operating foundation founded in 2010 by Eric Schmidt.

The 11th Hour Project was founded by Wendy Schmidt in 2005, and operates as part of the foundation. It works to raise awareness about climate change and renewable energy sources, and operates as part of the foundation. The project awards various grants and helped distribute the documentary film An Inconvenient Truth. It also provided initial operating budget for the nonprofit news organization Climate Central.

ReMain Nantucket, formed in 2007, is a wholly owned subsidiary of the foundation, dedicated to the economic, social, and environmental vitality of downtown Nantucket, Massachusetts.

The Schmidt Ocean Institute founded in 2009, is a separate private foundation established by Eric and Wendy Schmidt, that has received grants from the Schmidt Family Foundation for acquiring and operating the Institute’s oceanographic research vessels, including the Falkor.

The Foundation has provided support for the Wendy Schmidt Oil Cleanup X Challenge. a challenge award offered by the X Prize Foundation for efficient capturing of crude oil from ocean water, inspired by the Deepwater Horizon oil spill. It was announced in July 2010, and $1.3 million in prizes, were awarded in October 2011. It also supports the $1.5 million Wendy Schmidt Ocean Health X Prize for work on ocean acidification.

In March 2013, the Foundation and the Ellen MacArthur Foundation launched the Schmidt-MacArthur Fellowship, a global fellowship program for developing the skills and innovative mindset needed for the circular economy.

In 2020, Sophie Schmidt, daughter of Eric Schmidt and Wendy Schmidt, stated that Rest of World, a nonprofit news organization, has received 6 million dollars from her family trust. She also indicated that she would spend $60 million on Rest of World over the next decade to fund its operations. Rest of World is an American nonprofit publication that covers technology stories from outside Western countries. It was launched in 2020 by Sophie Schmidt.

In 2024, the Foundation provided a founding investment to its former chief innovation officer Tom Kalil for the founding of Renaissance Philanthropy, a new organization dedicated to increasing philanthropic funding for science and technology.
