= Special Competitive Studies Project =

American think tank

- Abbreviation: SCSP
- Formation: October 2021
- Founder: Eric Schmidt
- Purpose: AI & national security
- Headquarters: 1550 Crystal Dr, Arlington, VA 22202
- Location: Arlington, VA, US
- Chairman: Eric Schmidt
- CEO: Ylli Bajraktari
- Board of directors: Michèle Flournoy, Nadia Schadlow, Robert O. Work, Mac Thornberry
- Staff: 52
- Website: https://www.scsp.ai

The Special Competitive Studies Project (SCSP) is a non-partisan U.S. think tank and private foundation focused on technology and security. Founded by former Google CEO Eric Schmidt in October 2021, SCSP's stated mission is to "make recommendations to strengthen America’s long-term competitiveness as artificial intelligence (AI) and other emerging technologies are reshaping our national security, economy, and society." It seeks to ensure that "America is positioned and organized to win the techno-economic competition between now and 2030."

SCSP is also a subsidiary of The Eric & Wendy Schmidt Fund for Strategic Innovation, the Schmidt family's private foundation.

== History ==
Inspired by the Rockefeller Special Studies Project launched in the 1950s and led by Henry Kissinger, SCSP seeks to expand on the work of the National Security Commission on Artificial Intelligence (NSCAI) by including other emerging technologies and issues of concern in its analyses. The NSCAI was dissolved on 1 October 2021, and Eric Schmidt announced the SCSP initiative four days later. Much of the NSCAI staff became members of the SCSP.

== Leadership ==
As of December 2023, SCSP's president and CEO is Ylli Bajraktari, former executive director of the National Security Commission on Artificial Intelligence (NSCAI). Former NSCAI Chief of Staff Michael Gable serves as executive vice president, and former NSCAI Director of Operations and Designated Federal Officer Angela Ponmakha serves as vice president and Chief of Staff. There are 30 full-time staff members.

== Activities ==
SCSP's core work is divided into six panels, including: foreign policy, intelligence, defense, economy, society, and future tech platforms.

Recent notable events include the 2022 Global Emerging Technology Summit, at which Jake Sullivan, Kathleen H. Hicks, Wendy Sherman, Nancy Pelosi, among other former senior U.S. and foreign government officials, delivered remarks.

In 2023, SCSP hosted NatSecTech workshops at several universities that examined the global competition between the U.S. and China and how it will affect future society, economy, and defense. SCSP and the RAND Corporation collaborated on a series of wargames in 2023 that simulated a potential Chinese invasion of Taiwan to explore new technological options for Taiwan's defense, focusing on the integration of commercial technologies into military strategies. In May 2023, SCSP hosted the Ash Carter Exchange on Innovation and National Security attended by senior U.S. defense officials. In September 2023, SCSP hosted the 2023 Global Emerging Technology Summit, for which US Secretary of State Antony Blinken delivered video remarks.

SCSP awarded a grant to the Australian Strategic Policy Institute (ASPI) to help with its Critical Technology Tracker project (published in March 2023). It also supports the Kissinger Center Papers project at Johns Hopkins University SAIS.

In late-November 2023, SCSP launched a joint project on "Artificial Intelligence, Human-Machine Teaming, and the Future of Intelligence Analysis” with ASPI in Canberra.

In 2024, SCSP launched a series of "AI+" events focusing on AI's convergence with other technologies or systems. In 2024, SCSP hosted an AI+Robotics Summit. In April 2025, SCSP co-hosted the AI+Biotechnology Summit with the National Security Commission on Emerging Biotechnology.

== Board of advisors ==
As of December 2024, SCSP's board of advisors includes Michèle Flournoy, Nadia Schadlow, Robert O. Work, and William “Mac” Thornberry III.

== Publications ==
=== Reports and Briefs ===
- Framework for Identifying Highly Consequential AI Use Cases, November 2023 (in collaboration with Johns Hopkins University Applied Physics Laboratory)
- Generative AI: The Future of Innovation Power, September 2023
- AI Governance Authority Options Memo, June 2023
- DEFENSE Interim Panel Report, October 2022
- Mid-Decade Challenges to National Competitiveness, September 2022 In its coverage of the report, Axios wrote: "From SCSP's perspective, the geopolitical, technological, and ideological futures are all deeply interrelated: "By the end of this decade, we will know if we will live in a world shaped by free expression, tolerance, and self-determination or dictated by censorship and coercion."

== See also ==
- List of think tanks in the United States
