= How Google Works =

2014 book by Eric Schmidt and Jonathan Rosenberg

- Authors: Eric Schmidt, Jonathan Rosenberg
- Language: English
- Subject: Business
- Genre: Non-fiction
- Publisher: Grand Central Publishing
- Publication date: September 2014; 12 years ago
- Publication place: United States
- Media type: Hardcover, Ebook
- Pages: 304 (hardcover)
- ISBN: 9781455582341

How Google Works is a book co-written by Google's Executive Chairman and ex-CEO Eric Schmidt and former SVP of Products Jonathan Rosenberg. The authors explain how technology has shifted the balance of power from companies to consumers and make the argument that the only way to succeed in this ever-changing landscape is to create superior products and attract a new breed of multifaceted employees, dubbed "smart creatives". The book is in English and was published on 23 September 2014 by Grand Central Publishing, a division of Hachette Book Group. The hardcover version is 304 pages in length. Covering various topics such as corporate culture, strategy, talent, decision-making, communication, innovation, and dealing with disruption, the authors illustrate management maxims with numerous insider anecdotes from Google's history. It became a New York Times bestseller.

== Contents ==
The book is divided into several main sections:

- Introduction—Lessons Learned from the Front Row
- Culture—Believe Your Own Slogans
- Strategy—Your Plan Is Wrong
- Talent—Hiring Is the Most Important Thing You Do
- Decisions—The True Meaning of Consensus
- Communications—Be a Damn Good Router
- Innovation—Create the Primordial Ooze
- Conclusion—Imagine the Unimaginable
