= Jonathan Rosenberg (technologist) =

American technologist

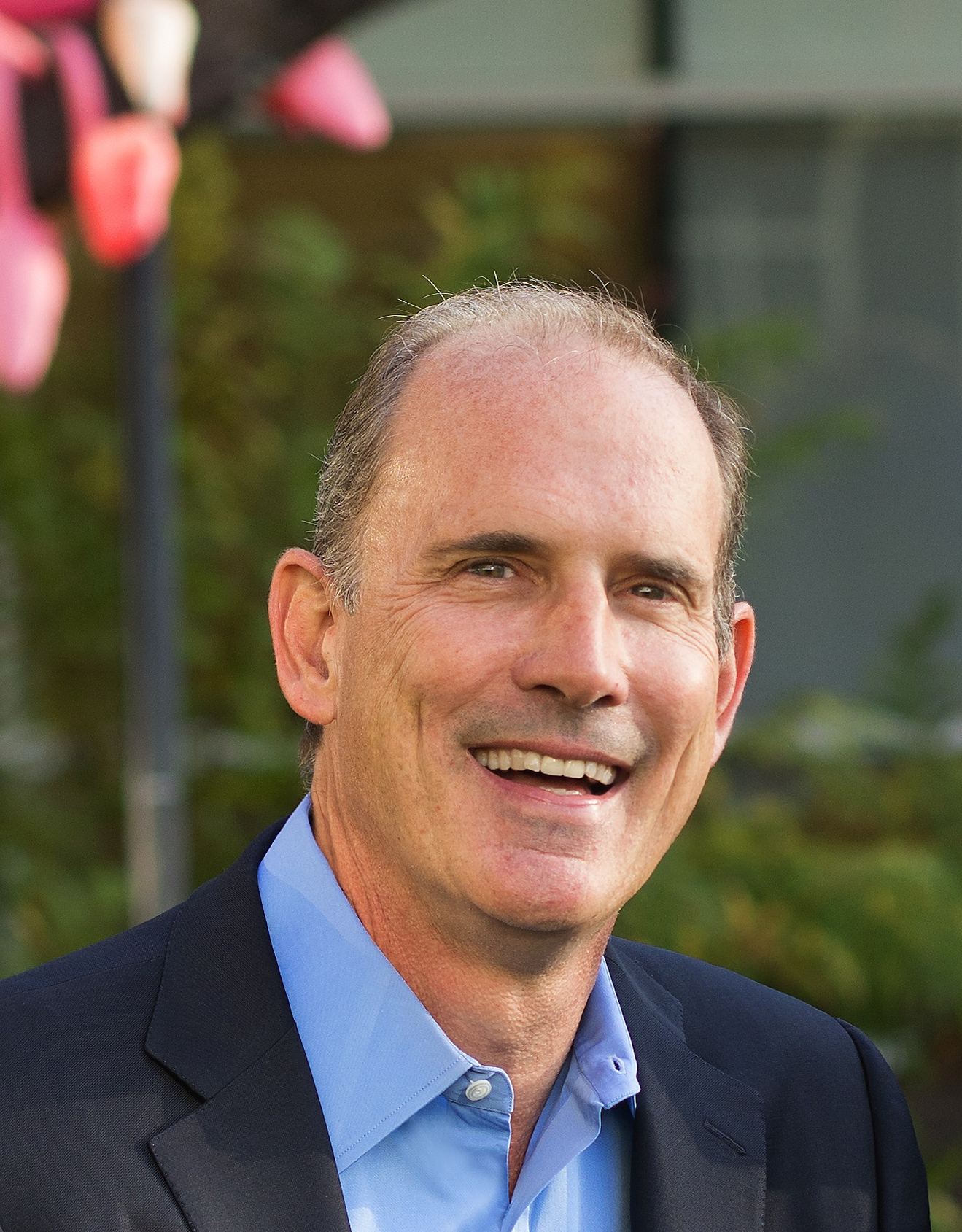
- Born: July 20, 1961 (age 65)
- Education: University of Chicago; Claremont McKenna College

Jonathan Rosenberg is the former Senior Vice President of Products at Google and current advisor to Alphabet Inc. management team and board.

== Biography ==
Jonathan Rosenberg was born on July 20, 1961. Rosenberg received a Masters of Business Administration degree from the University of Chicago as well as a Bachelor of Arts degree with honors in economics from Claremont McKenna College.

== Career ==
Previous to joining Google, Rosenberg was Vice President of Software for palmOne, a provider of handheld computer and communications solutions. He joined Google in 2002 and oversaw the design and development of the company’s consumer, advertiser, and partner products, including Search, Ads, Gmail, Android, Apps, and Chrome. While at Google, Rosenberg managed many noteworthy employees, including Marissa Mayer. He resigned from his position as SVP in 2011. Prior to joining at Google, Rosenberg worked at @Home, where he was a founding member of the product group and senior vice president of online products and services after @Home merged with Excite. Rosenberg was appointed as the COO of Motorola Mobility, replacing former COO Dennis Woodside, on February 12, 2014.

He is the coauthor, along with Google Executive Chairman Eric Schmidt and Director of Executive Communications Alan Eagle, of a New York Times best-selling book titled How Google Works, which was published in September, 2014. He also published a book called Trillion Dollar Coach that reached number 1 on Wall Street journal bestseller list and was also New York Times Best Seller.
