= Zico Kolter =

AI safety researcher

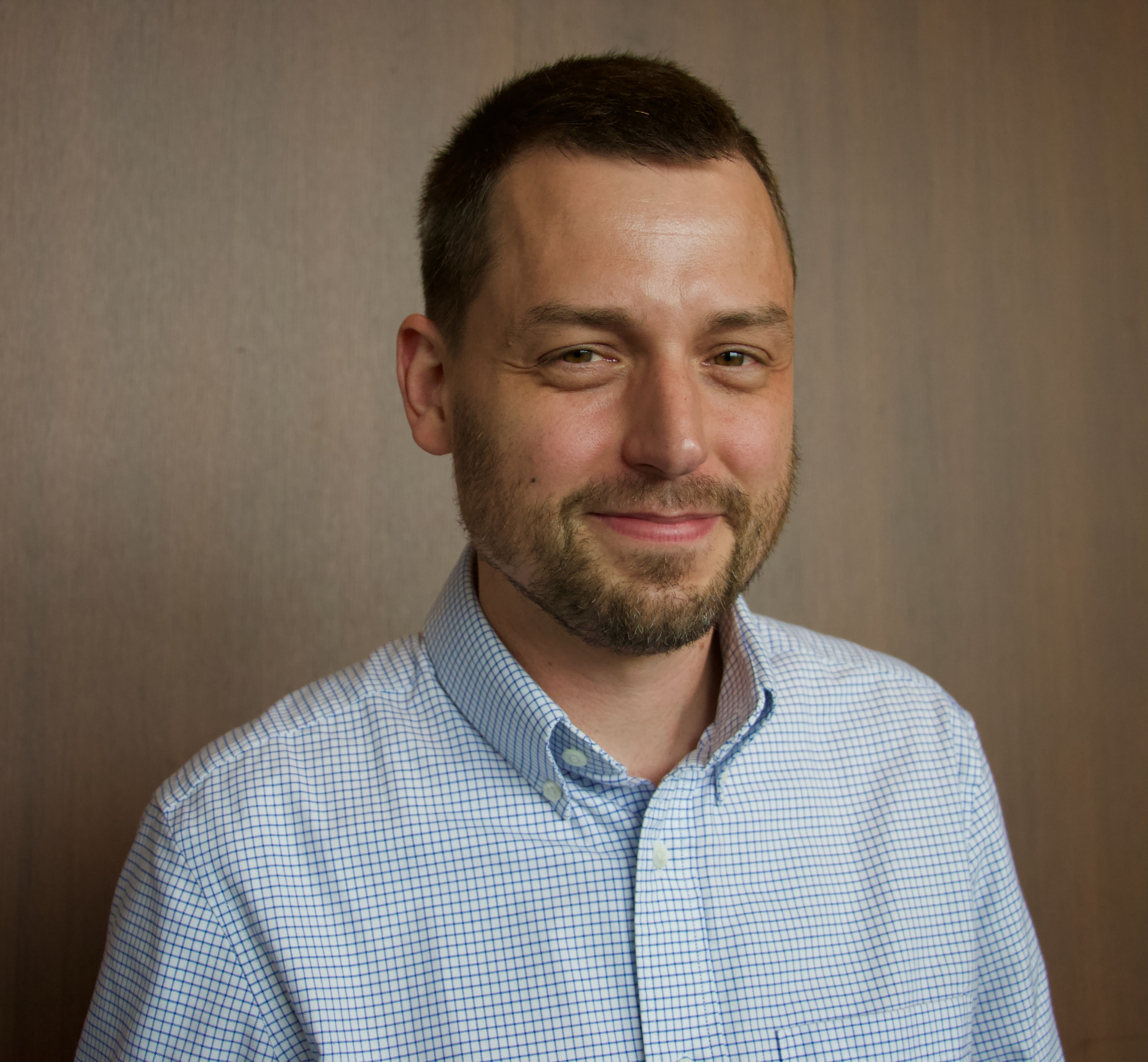
- Kolter at ICLR 2025
- Education: Massachusetts Institute of Technology; Stanford University
- Occupations: Professor & Director of Machine Learning Department
- Organization: Carnegie Mellon University
- Website: zicokolter.com

Jeremy Zico Kolter is a professor at Carnegie Mellon University and director of its machine learning department. He focuses primarily on AI safety research. He is a co-founder and senior advisor of Gray Swan AI, an AI safety and security company. In 2024, he was appointed to the board of directors for OpenAI, and became chair of its safety and security committee. In 2025, he was named as a recipient of funding from Schmidt Sciences AI safety science program.

Kolter earned his PhD in computer science at Stanford University and completed a postdoctoral fellowship at Massachusetts Institute of Technology. He joined the CMU faculty in 2012. His other corporate positions have included chief data scientist at C3.ai and chief expert at Bosch Center for AI. At CMU, he has worked on projects such as finding ways to automate assessment of large language model safety.
