= Alexander Titus =

American biotechnology professional

Alexander J. Titus
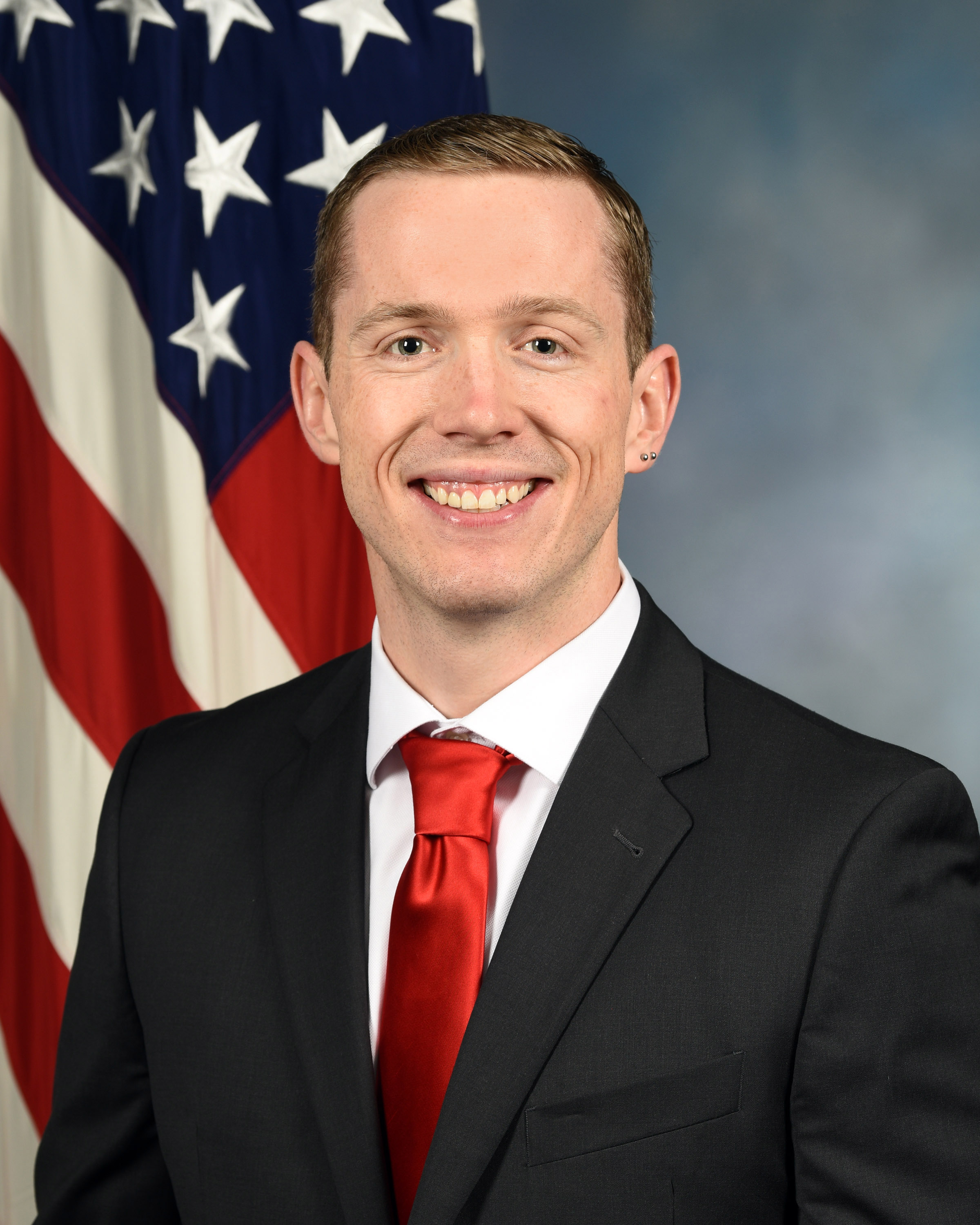
- Titus in 2019
- Education: University of Puget Sound (BS, BA); Dartmouth College (PhD)
- Occupations: Biotechnology professional, strategist, entrepreneur

Alexander J. Titus is an American expert in AI, biotechnology, and national security, known for his contributions in these fields.

== Early life and education ==
Titus earned a BS in biochemistry and a B.A. in biology from the University of Puget Sound and a Ph.D. in machine learning and bioinformatics from Dartmouth College.

== Career ==
Titus’s career spans academia, government, and the private sector, starting with roles in data science and bioinformatics at Dartmouth College.

Titus served as the first assistant director of biotechnology at the U.S. Department of Defense, leading modernization efforts and helping establish BioMADE. Later, as ARMI’s chief strategy officer, he oversaw pandemic response programs and DoD initiatives.

Titus has worked at Google as a strategic business executive, leading cloud healthcare & life sciences strategy and pandemic response for the public sector, and as VP of Artificial Intelligence and Machine Learning at Avidity Biosciences.

Titus's previous academic appointments have included roles as principal scientist at the USC Information Sciences Institute, Research Faculty at the USC Iovine and Young Academy, External Fellow at the International Computer Science Institute in Berkeley, CA, and Affiliate Faculty at the University of New Hampshire.

In 2022, Titus became a U.S. Senate-appointed Commissioner on the National Security Commission on Emerging Biotechnology, focusing on enhancing the U.S. defense and national security use of biotechnology. The Commission released its interim report in December 2023, and its final report on April 8, 2025 recommending the U.S. government invest $15 billion into the biotechnology industry across six strategic pillars.

== Writing ==
Titus writes broadly across peer-reviewed science, policy, and science fiction. His non-fiction work focuses on the co-evolution of technology, public policy, and society at The Connected Ideas Project, and he published his debut science fiction series in quick succession between September to December 2025, including titles Synthetic Eden, Hubris Rising, Divine Blueprint, and Genesis Undone, rounding out the full Echoes of Tomorrow series.
