= National Security Commission on Emerging Biotechnology =

US legislative commission

National Security Commission on Emerging Biotechnology (NSCEB)
Commission overview
- Formed: 2022; 4 years ago
- Commission executives: Todd Young, Chairman; Dr. Michelle Rozo, Vice Chair
- Parent department: United States Congress
- Website: Official website

The National Security Commission on Emerging Biotechnology (NSCEB) is a bipartisan U.S. legislative commission established in March 2022 by section 1091 of the National Defense Authorization Act for Fiscal Year 2022. The Commission was directed to examine the national security implications of emerging biotechnologies, including their relevance to the Department of Defense, and to provide recommendations to Congress and the executive branch.

The law required an interim report within one year of establishment and a final unclassified report within two years.

The Commission issued its final report and recommendations to Congress in April 2025.

== Commissioners ==
As of 2025, the Commission's membership includes:

- Senator Todd Young (R-IN), Chair since September 2024
- Dr. Michelle Rozo, Vice Chair
- Senator Alex Padilla (D-CA)
- Representative Stephanie Bice (R-OK)
- Representative Ro Khanna (D-CA)
- Dov S. Zakheim - former Under Secretary of Defense (Comptroller)
- Paul Arcangeli, former staff director, House Committee on Armed Services
- Dr. Alexander Titus - former Assistant Director for Biotechnology in the Office of the Under Secretary of Defense for Research and Engineering
- Dr. Eric Schmidt - former CEO of Google
- Dr. Angela Belcher, Massachusetts Institute of Technology
- Dawn Meyerriecks, former Deputy Director of the Central Intelligence Agency for Science and Technology

== Reports and policy recommendations ==
The Commission submitted its first report to Congress in December 2023 which included recommendations related to agriculture policy for potential inclusion in the Farm Bill.

In December 2023, NSCEB published its interim report, which discusses the potential applications of biotechnology in fields such as human health, food security, energy production, and economic development. The report stresses the need for the U.S. to stay ahead in biotechnology as international competition increases.

In January 2024, the Commission published white papers on the integration of artificial intelligence and biotechnology ("AIxBio"). The Commission noted that AIxBio research would transform the speed and scope of emerging biotechnology innovation.

In May 2024, members of Congress introduced several pieces of legislation recommended by the Commission focused on food security and agricultural security.

In December 2024, several NSCEB policy ideas were passed into law as part of the FY25 NDAA.

In February 2025, the Special Competitive Studies Project announced a joint event to be held in April 2025 with the NSCEB to mark the publication of the Commission's final policy report.

In April 2025, the Commission published its final report to Congress. The report called for a minimum of $15 billion in federal spending over five years to secure American leadership in biotechnology, spanning policy areas including defense spending, product regulation, and infrastructure. The report indicated that the United States needs to both innovate faster and slow down the People's Republic of China. The policy recommendations include elevating biotechnology as a strategic national priority, getting more U.S. biotechnology products to market, maximizing biotechnology for defense, being the global innovation leader, building a biotechnology workforce, and working more on biotechnology with allies and partners.

On April 9, 2025, the NSCEB's Congressional Commissioners introduced the National Biotechnology Initiative Act, legislation based on report recommendations to create a National Biotechnology Coordination Office at the White House.

As of September 2025, about half of the NSCEB's recommendations from the April 2025 report had been introduced as bills in Congress.

In December 2025, more than a dozen NSCEB recommendations were passed into law as part of the National Defense Authorization Act for Fiscal Year 2026.
