= Raju Narisetti =

Indian digital media content executive

- Born: 26 June 1966 (age 60); Hyderabad, India
- Education: Indiana University Bloomington
- Notable credit(s): News Corporation, Mint, The Economic Times, The Washington Post, The Wall Street Journal
- Board member of: Wikimedia Foundation; Rest of World

Raju Narisetti (born 1966) is a journalist and former newspaper editor who has been the global publishing director at McKinsey & Company since 2020. From July 2018 to December 2019, he was a professor of professional practice and director of the Knight-Bagehot Fellowship Program at the Columbia University Graduate School of Journalism. In October 2017, Narisetti was appointed to the board of trustees of the Wikimedia Foundation. He is one of the Young Global Leaders of the World Economic Forum and a board member of an American nonprofit publishing entity, Rest of World.

== Career ==
Narisetti holds a B.A. in economics from Osmania University, an M.B.A. from the Institute of Rural Management Anand and an M.A. in journalism from Indiana University Bloomington. He started as a journalist at The Economic Times in India before commencing his U.S. career at the Dayton Daily News, where he was a staff reporter from 1991 to 1994.

He first joined The Wall Street Journal as a reporter specializing in global media, technology and consumer products trends in 1994; over the next twelve years, he was promoted to deputy national editor of the American edition; managing editor (2003–2004) and editor (2004–2006) of The Wall Street Journal Europe; and deputy managing editor (2005–2006) in charge of Europe, the Middle East and Africa for the newspaper's global brand. As the founding editor of Mint from 2006 to 2009, Narisetti facilitated the publication's emergence as India's second-largest business newspaper. It is owned by HT Media, which also publishes the Hindustan Times.

Narisetti was managing editor, digital of The Washington Post from 2009 to 2012 before briefly rejoining The Wall Street Journal (as head of The Wall Street Journal Digital Network) in 2012. As senior vice president of growth and strategy for News Corporation from 2013 to 2016, he helped the media group cultivate new revenue opportunities, particularly in Asia.

He was named president and chief executive officer of Gizmodo Media Group following its acquisition by Univision in September 2016. He remained in the role until April 2018. According to The Daily Beast, Narisetti was forced out by Univision amid staff cuts.
