= William Mark (academic) =

American academic

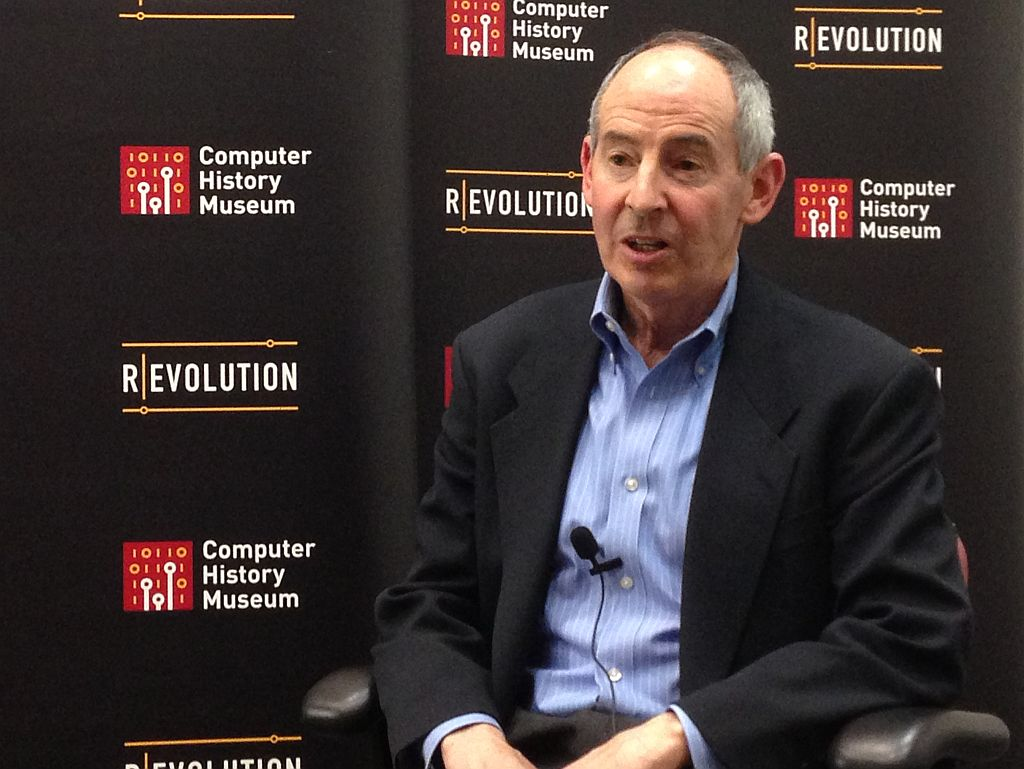
- Scientific career
- Workplaces: SRI International

William S. "Bill" Mark is a vice president at SRI International, where he has been in charge of their Information and Computing Sciences Division since 1998.

== Early life and education ==
Mark received a B.S. and an M.S. in electrical engineering and computer science in 1973, and a Ph.D. in computer science in 1976, all from the Massachusetts Institute of Technology.

== Career ==
Mark was a co-founder of the company Savoir, which developed software tools for flexible manufacturing. Prior to his roles in industry, he held research positions at the General Motors Research Laboratories as well as the University of Southern California Information Sciences Institute. Mark then worked at Lockheed Martin's Palo Alto Research Labs. He later headed the System Technology Group at National Semiconductor, which focused on design and implementation of silicon-based systems, until 1998.

Mark joined SRI International in 1998. He was a principal investigator of the CALO project that eventually led to the development of Siri and related technologies.

In 2018, he was nominated by former US Department of Defense Secretary James Mattis to be a member of the National Security Commission on Artificial Intelligence (NSCAI). The commission filed its final report in October 2021.

== Awards and memberships ==
Mark has served on DARPA's Information, Science and Technology Committee and the editorial board of IEEE Computer.

Mark is a member of the Association for the Advancement of Artificial Intelligence, the Association for Computing Machinery, the Association for Computational Linguistics and the American Institute of Aeronautics and Astronautics. He was a member of the Industrial Advisory Board of the University of California, Berkeley's Electrical Engineering and Computer Sciences Department; and is currently a member of the Industrial Advisory Board of the Team for Research in Ubiquitous Secure Technology.

Mark was a member of the National Security Commission on Artificial Intelligence (NSCAI) that was established in 2018 and issued its final report in March 2021.

He has been a member of the Board at Kasisto since 2014, which is a spin off of SRI International.
