= National Biotechnology Initiative Act =

The National Biotechnology Initiative Act is a bill introduced during the 119th Congress in the U.S. Senate and the U.S. House of Representatives. The bill is one of the major recommendations put forth by the National Security Commission on Emerging Biotechnology.

== Bill summary ==
The National Biotechnology Initiative Act (NBIA) aims to improve federal coordination on emerging biotechnology and streamline outdated and ineffective regulatory structures that inhibit biotechnology innovation.

Specifically, according to lawmakers, the legislation promotes federal coordination on biotechnology by establishing:

- A National Biotechnology Coordination Office (NBCO) within the Executive Office of the President to lead and coordinate federal biotechnology efforts by streamlining biotechnology regulation. The office would make these improvements by easing regulatory burdens for well-understood products, negotiating interagency agreements to create clear regulatory pathways, and working with the Office of Management and Budget in cases of disagreement among agencies. The NBCO would also publish a national biotechnology strategy every five years.
- A Principal Advisor to the President for Biotechnology, who would also serve as Director of the Coordination Office.
- An Interagency Committee to coordinate across federal departments and agencies.
- Clear roles and responsibilities for all federal departments and agencies engaged in biotechnology, including USDA, FDA, and EPA.

== Legislative support and activity ==
In April 2025, the Congressional Commissioners of the National Security Commission on Emerging Biotechnology introduced the NBIA in both the House and the Senate. Senators Todd Young and Alex Padilla introduced S.1387 and Representatives Stephanie Bice and Ro Khanna introduced H.R.2756.

The bill has been endorsed by several biotechnology trade associations, companies, and industry leaders, including:

- Ag Bioeconomy Coalition
- American Society for Microbiology
- Corn Refiners Association
- Federation of American Scientists
- Plant Based Products Council
