= National Security Commission on Artificial Intelligence =

US independent commission

- Formation: 2018; 8 years ago
- Dissolved: October 1, 2021; 5 years ago
- Purpose: Reporting relationship between AI and US national security
- Headquarters: Washington, DC., United States of America
- Chairman: Dr. Eric Schmidt
- Website: cybercemetery.unt.edu/nscai/20211005220330/http://nscai.gov/

The National Security Commission on Artificial Intelligence (NSCAI) was a federal independent commission of the United States from 2018 to 2021. Its mission was to make recommendations to the President and Congress to "advance the development of artificial intelligence, machine learning, and associated technologies to comprehensively address the national security and defense needs of the United States". The commission's 15 members were nominated by the United States Congress.

The NSCAI was dissolved on 1 October 2021.

== History and reporting ==
The NSCAI began working in March 2019 and by November 2019 it had received more than 200 classified and unclassified briefings to help with the creation of its final report due in 2021.On 4 November 2019, the NSCAI shared its interim report with Congress, where it explained the 27 initial judgements to base its ongoing work.

In the interim report the commission also agreed on seven principles:

- Global leadership in AI technology is a national security priority
- AI adoption is an urgent imperative for national security
- A shared sense of responsibility for the American peoples security must be created from government officials and private sector leaders.
- It needs to find local AI talent and use it to attract the world’s best minds
- Actions used for the protection of America’s AI leadership against foreign threats needs to follow the principles of free enterprise, free inquiry and free flow of ideas.
- The technical limitations of AI are universally known, however, a strong desire remains for powerful, dependable, and secure AI systems.
- United States used AI must follow American values including the rule of law

Fundamental areas of effort for the preservation of U.S. advantages were also agreed upon in the interim report of 2019.

The NSCAI released its first report of recommendations in March 2020, most of which were included in the 2021 National Defense Authorization Act. In July 2020, the commission published the second report to Congress. It identified 35 actions for both Executive and Legislative branches, which were focused on six fundamental areas. This report was available to the public. In January 2021, a draft of the final report was presented at a panel led by Schmidt. The report recommended the US to use AI technology for military use and development.

It issued its final report in March 2021, saying that the U.S. is not sufficiently prepared to defend or compete against China in the AI era. It was broken up into two parts, the first titled “Defending America in the AI Era”, and the second “Winning the Technology Competition”. The report spoke about China’s efforts and investments into integration and that it could very well take the lead in AI in the next few years. Additional suggestions were made to concentrate on AI in everything we do and to implement it into US national security on multiple levels, as well as focus on bringing in new talent to develop AI and to introduce it to the working force on both civilian and military levels. Another recommendation of the NSCAI report was to develop and provide China and Russia with alternative models that are based on norms and democratic values. The final report also included a proposed $40 billion budget for government spending. On 14 April 2021, NSCAI executive director Ylli Bajraktari and director of Research and Analysis Justin Lynch participated in an event held by the Center for Security and Emerging Technology (CSET) to discuss the final report findings.

In October 2021, NSCAI chair Eric Schmidt founded the bipartisan, non-profit Special Competitive Studies Project (SCSP) through his family led non-profit Eric & Wendy Schmidt Fund for Strategic Innovation in order to carry on the NSCAI’s efforts and expand beyond national security.

The Foundation for Defense of Democracies held an event in June 2023, called “Thinking Forward After the NSCAI and CSC: A Discussion on AI and Cyber Policy”, with former members of NSCAI on the moderation panel, including Eric Schmidt and Ylli Bajraktari.

== Members ==
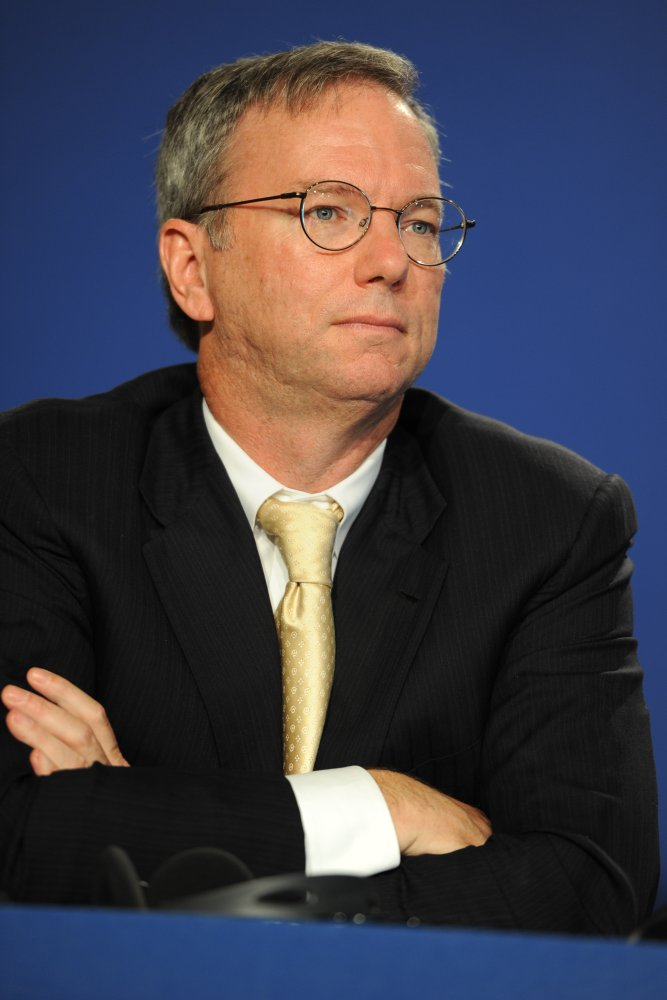
Eric Schmidt, chairman of the commission

Members of the National Security Commission on Artificial Intelligence:

- Eric Schmidt (chair), former CEO of Google
- Robert Work (Vice Chair), former Deputy Secretary of Defense
- Mignon Clyburn, former Commissioner of the Federal Communications Commission
- Chris Darby, CEO of In-Q-Tel
- Kenneth M. Ford, CEO of the Florida Institute for Human and Machine Cognition
- Jose-Marie Griffiths, President of Dakota State University
- Eric Horvitz, Technical Fellow at Microsoft
- Katrina G. McFarland, former Assistant Secretary of Defense for Acquisition
- Jason Matheny, Director of the Center for Security and Emerging Technology at Georgetown University
- Gilman Louie, partner at Alsop Louie Partners
- William Mark, vice president at SRI International
- Andy Jassy, CEO of Amazon Web Services (AWS)
- Safra Catz, CEO of Oracle
- Steve Chien, Technical Fellow at Jet Propulsion Laboratory (JPL)
- Andrew Moore, Google/Alphabet

== Recommendations ==
The report's recommendations include:

- Dramatically increasing non-defense federal spending on AI research and development, doubling every year from $2 billion in 2022, to $32 billion in 2026. That would bring it up to a level similar to spending on biomedical research
- A dramatic increase in undergraduate scholarship and graduate studies fellowships in AI
- Creation of a Digital Corps to bring skilled tech workers into government
- Founding of a Digital Service Academy: an accredited university providing subsidized education in exchange for a commitment to work for a time in government
- Include civil rights and civil liberty reports for new AI systems or major updates to existing systems
- Expanding allocations of employment-based green cards, and giving them to every AI PhD graduate from an accredited U.S. university
- Reforming the acquisition management system Department of Defense to make it faster and easier to introduce new technologies

As of December 2024, approximately 20% of the NSCAI's recommendations had been implemented through Congressional or Executive Action.

== Transparency ==
In December 2019, a ruling was made under the Freedom of Information Act (FOIA) that the NSCAI must also provide historical documents upon request. The Electronic Privacy Information Center (EPIC) filed the lawsuit against the NSCAI in September 2019 after being refused information about the upcoming meetings and prepared records of the commission under FOIA and the Federal Advisory Committee Act (FACA). The U.S. District Court for the District of Columbia ruled in June 2020 that the NSCAI must comply with FACA and therefore hold open meetings and provide records to the public. The lawsuit was also filed by EPIC.

== See also ==
- Regulation of artificial intelligence in the United States
- Use of artificial intelligence by the United States Department of Defense
