= 70/20/10 model (learning and development) =

Learning and development model

The 70:20:10 model for learning and development (also written as 70-20-10 or 70/20/10) is a learning and development model that suggests a proportional breakdown of how people learn effectively. It is based on a survey conducted in 1996 asking nearly 200 executives to self-report how they believed they learned.

In this survey respondents reported the following influences on learning:

- 70% from challenging assignments
- 20% from developmental relationships
- 10% from coursework and training

This Model was created by Morgan McCall, Michael M. Lombardo, and Robert A. Eichinger by expressing their rationale behind the 70:20:10 model in the following way in The Career Architect Development Planner:

Development generally begins with a realization of current or future need and the motivation to do something about it. This might come from feedback, a mistake, watching other people’s reactions, failing or not being up to a task – in other words, from experience. The odds are that development will be about 70% from on-the-job experiences - working on tasks and problems; about 20% from feedback and working around good and bad examples of the need; and 10% from courses and reading.

== Criticisms ==
Criticisms of the hypothesis include:

- A lack of supporting empirical evidence.
- The use of perfectly even numbers.
- The nature of the survey (i.e. Asking already successful managers to reflect on their experiences.)
- The model may not reflect the changes in the market instigated by online technologies. For example, it does not reflect the recent focus on informal learning.
- The 70:20:10 model is not prescriptive. Author and learning and development professional Andy Jefferson asserts it "is neither a scientific fact nor a recipe for how best to develop people".
- Every business has its own optimisation levers, and it will be imprudent to apply the 70:20:10 model to all businesses.
- The method being too old and deprecated.

== See also ==
- 20% Project
