= Sophie Schmidt (publisher) =

American media executive

- Education: Princeton University (B.A.); Stanford University (MBA); Harvard University (MPA)
- Known for: Founder of Rest of World
- Family: Eric Schmidt (father); Wendy Schmidt (mother)

Sophie Schmidt (born 1986 or 1987) is an American media executive and publisher. She is the founder and publisher of Rest of World, a nonprofit journalism organization focused on global technology news. She is also a director at the Schmidt Family Foundation.

== Early life and education ==
Sophie Schmidt is the daughter of former Google CEO and executive chairman Eric Schmidt and his wife, Wendy Schmidt.

She attended Princeton University, graduating in 2009 with a bachelor's degree in Islamic studies. She wrote her undergraduate thesis on the impact of Internet technology in the Muslim world. Schmidt holds a Master of Business Administration degree from Stanford University and a Master of Public Administration degree from Harvard University.

== Career ==
In 2013, Schmidt interned at SCL Group, the parent company of Cambridge Analytica. She subsequently worked in Dubai at the Afghan media company Moby Group, and held positions at Google-funded incubator Umbono and Xiaomi in Beijing.

Schmidt later worked as a public policy and communications manager at Uber for three years. Schmidt also serves as a director of the Schmidt Family Foundation.

In January 2013, Schmidt accompanied her father on a visit to North Korea as part of a delegation led by former New Mexico Governor and U.S. Ambassador to the United Nations Bill Richardson. Sophie documented her impressions in a widely cited blog post, describing highly controlled and staged interactions, including a visit to Kim Il Sung University's e-library, which she characterized as feeling artificial, comparing the unresponsive students to figurines. Her candid, detailed account of her time in the country garnered widespread media attention.

=== Rest of World ===
In May 2020, Schmidt officially launched Rest of World, a nonprofit media publication covering technology stories outside western countries. In September 2020, Schmidt told The Wall Street Journal that she had already invested $6 million out of a family trust into the nonprofit and planned to spend "as much as $60 million over the next decade to sustain and expand the site and shine a light on technology's impact beyond developed Western countries."

== Personal life and recognition ==
In April 2024, Schmidt was named a 2024 Young Global Leader by the World Economic Forum.

Sophie is Eric and Wendy Schmidt's only surviving child. Her sister, Alison, died in 2017 after a long illness.

She is based in New York.
