= Plug-in electric vehicles in Rhode Island =

As of March 2022, there were about 4,900 electric vehicles (including plug-in hybrid vehicles) in Rhode Island, equivalent to 0.7% of all vehicles in the state.

== Government policy ==
In March 2022, the state government introduced a $2,500 tax rebate for purchases of electric vehicles, and $1,500 for plug-in hybrid vehicles.

== Charging stations ==
As of October 2021, there were about 210 public AC level 2 charging stations and 25 public DC charging stations in Rhode Island.

The Infrastructure Investment and Jobs Act, signed into law in November 2021, allocates US$22 million to charging stations in Rhode Island.

As of 2022, the state government recognizes I-95 as a potential "alternative fuel corridor" with plans for charging stations every 50 miles (80 km).
