= Climate Central =

Nonprofit news organization

- Website type: News website
- Available in: English
- Headquarters: Princeton, New Jersey
- Owners: Climate Central, Inc.
- Website: www.climatecentral.org
- Commercial: No
- Launched: 2008; 18 years ago
- 2018 NCSE Friend of the Planet Award

Climate Central is a nonprofit news organization that analyzes and reports on climate science. Composed of scientists and science journalists, the organization conducts scientific research on climate change and energy issues, and produces multimedia content that is distributed via their website and media partners.

Climate Central also sponsors classes for meteorologists and provides climate graphics to television stations. This has been credited in part for the increase in acceptance of climate change science among local forecasters and their willingness to share it in their broadcasts.

Climate Central was founded in 2008 with seed money from The Flora Family Foundation and development funds from 11th Hour Project. The founding board included Jane Lubchenco, Steven Pacala and Wendy Schmidt. As of 2025, its current CEO and chief scientist is Benjamin Strauss.

== See also ==
- Scientific opinion on climate change
- Public opinion on climate change
- Climate change denial
