= Wendy Schmidt Oil Cleanup X Challenge =

- Awarded for: "develop innovative, rapidly deployable, and highly efficient methods of capturing crude oil from the ocean surface"
- Country: Worldwide
- Presented by: X Prize Foundation (sponsored by The Schmidt Family Foundation)
- Reward: US$1.4 million (US$1 million for the winner)
- Website: iprizecleanoceans.org

The Wendy Schmidt Oil Cleanup X CHALLENGE was a challenge award offered by the X PRIZE Foundation for efficient capturing of crude oil from ocean water. Inspired by the ongoing Deepwater Horizon oil spill disaster, the award was announced on July 29, 2010, and the official one-year competition began on August 1, 2010. The first three teams were to be awarded US$1 million, US$300,000 and US$100,000 respectively.

Of the over 350 teams that preregistered to participate in the challenge by January 2011, 37 officially registered the following month. By the time of the official testing in May 2011, the field of challengers had been narrowed to ten teams.

The winners for the challenge were announced on October 11, 2011. The first-place finisher and winner of the $1 million prize was the team of Elastec/American Marine using a forward advancing grooved disc skimmer. The second-place finisher and winner of $300,000 was the team NOFI. No other team met all of the challenge's goals, so the planned third place prize was not awarded.

The US$1.4 million prize purse was offered by Wendy Schmidt from The Schmidt Family Foundation.
