= Wendy Schmidt =

American businesswoman and philanthropist

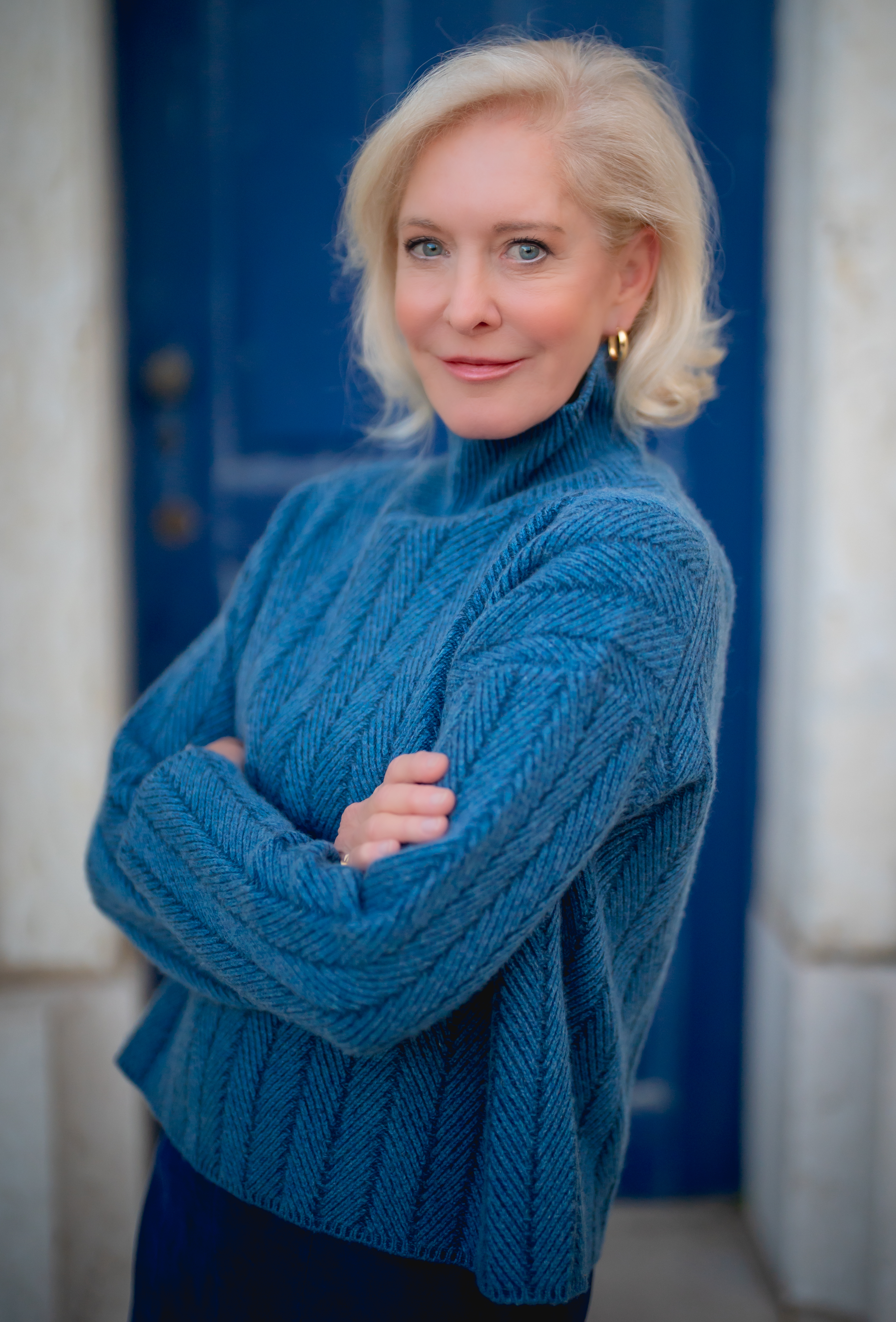
- Born: Wendy Susan Boyle; 26 July 1955 (age 71); Orange, New Jersey, U.S.
- Education: Smith College (BA); University of California, Berkeley (MA)
- Occupations: Philanthropist and investor
- Title: President and co-founder Schmidt Family Foundation; President and co-founder Schmidt Ocean Institute; Cofounder Schmidt Sciences; Cofounder 11th Hour Racing; Cofounder Agog
- Spouse: Eric Schmidt (m. 1980)
- Children: Sophie Schmidt
- Website: wendyschmidt.com

Wendy Susan Schmidt (née Boyle) is an American philanthropist and investor. She is the president and co-founder of the Schmidt Family Foundation, holding over $2 billion in philanthropic assets, and Schmidt Ocean Institute. She is married to Eric Schmidt, the former CEO of Google.

== Early life and education ==
Wendy Susan Boyle was born on July 26, 1955, in Orange, New Jersey, the second of five children and the only girl.

She graduated from Smith College in 1977 with a dual bachelor's degree in anthropology and sociology, before earning a master's degree in journalism from University of California, Berkeley.

== Career ==
After graduate school, Schmidt worked in marketing at Plexus Computers. In 1982, she was recruited to join the marketing department of Sun Microsystems, where she was employee #42. Schmidt left Sun Microsystems in 1986 after the company went public.

Schmidt studied interior design at Cañada College; she later founded and ran an interior design firm for 16 years.

In 2025, Schmidt acquired a controlling interest in Jigsaw Productions from its founder and president, Alex Gibney.

== Philanthropy ==
Schmidt is known for her philanthropic work related to clean energy, regenerative agriculture, ocean health, human rights and scientific research. She has created multiple philanthropic organizations with the support of her husband, Eric Schmidt. Wendy has led the Schmidt Family Foundation and Schmidt Ocean Institute since their founding.

=== Climate and sustainability ===
In 2006, Schmidt and her husband co-founded the Schmidt Family Foundation to support climate change initiatives. She serves as president of the foundation and directs its grantmaking and impact investing. The foundation's main grantmaking program, the 11th Hour Project, supports renewable energy, regenerative agriculture and food systems, ocean health and human rights. Another grantmaking program, Schmidt Marine Technology Partners, invests in early marine technologies that restore and protect ocean health. The foundation also supports program-aligned organizations including Ecovative Design, Navajo Power and Virunga National Park.

In 2010, through the Schmidt Family Foundation, she offered the prize purse of the Wendy Schmidt Oil Cleanup X Challenge, a challenge award for the efficient capturing of crude oil from seawater motivated by the Deepwater Horizon oil spill.

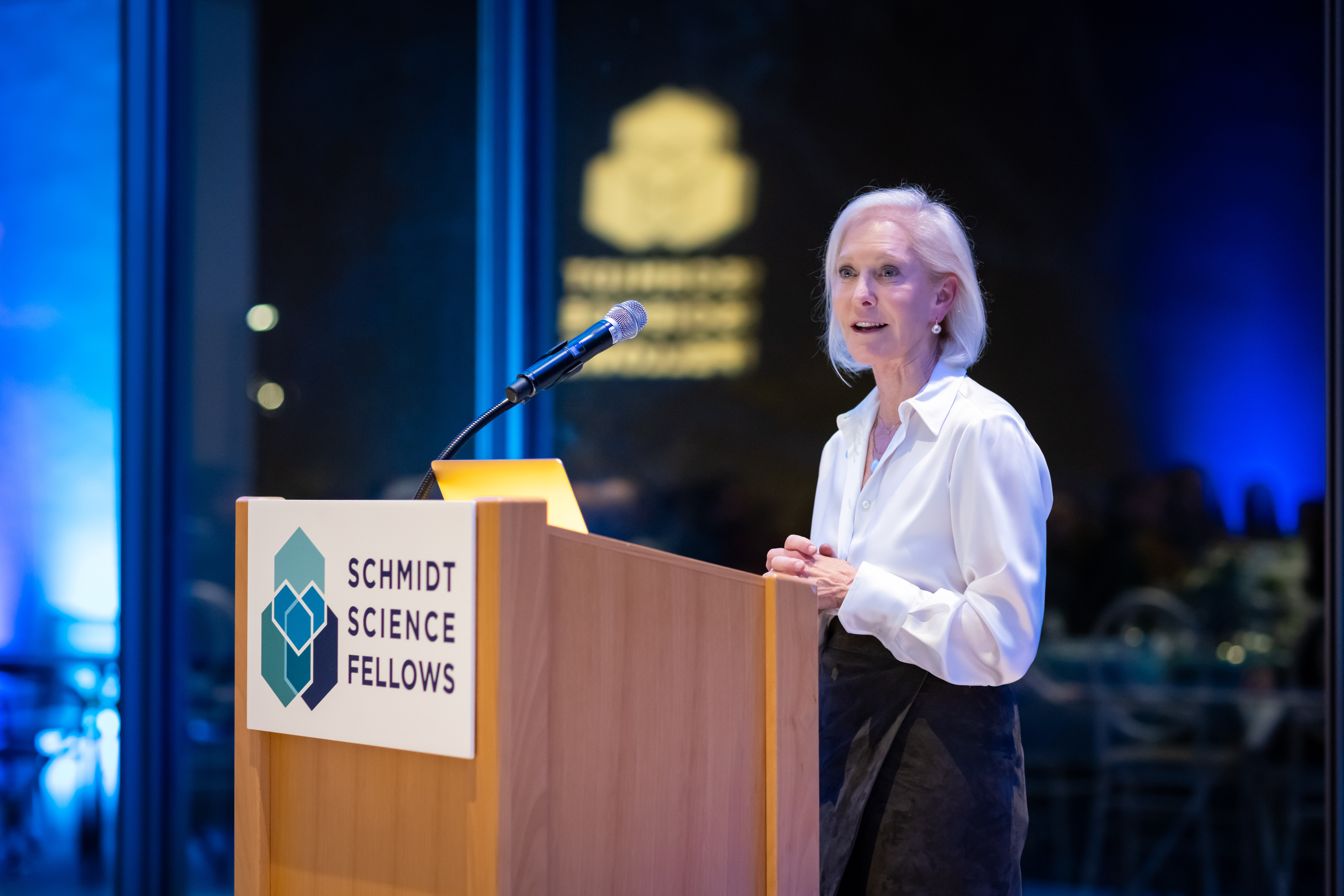
Schmidt at the Schmidt Science Fellows Global Meeting in 2022.

In 2015, Schmidt initiated the 'Wendy Schmidt Ocean Health XPRIZE': a global competition that awarded $2 million to scientists and engineers who demonstrated excellence in the creation of new accurate and affordable ocean acidification technology. The Schmidt Family Foundation announced a $10 million grant to the Monterey Bay Aquarium in February 2015. The grant enabled the aquarium to collaborate with industry leaders and address growing challenges in global fisheries.

Through the foundation, Wendy Schmidt has supported Indigenous causes, contributing a $5 million professorship endowment to Princeton University in December 2020, and an endowed gift to Stanford University to expand its Native American Studies program.

In 2008, Schmidt founded Remain to support the social and environmental sustainability of Nantucket, Massachusetts, including the year-round viability of its downtown. Schmidt, who is a competitive sailor, also founded 11th Hour Racing to improve sustainability in sailing and the maritime industry.

In 2009, Schmidt and her husband founded Schmidt Ocean Institute. The virtual institute operates R/V Falkor (too), and makes it available at no cost to scientists worldwide in exchange for making their science and discoveries publicly available in real-time.

=== Science, technology, and education ===
In 2009, Wendy and Eric Schmidt created the $25 million Schmidt Transformative Technology Fund at Princeton University to support research and technology in the natural sciences and engineering.

In partnership with the Rhodes Trust, Wendy and Eric Schmidt created Schmidt Science Fellows in 2018: a post-doctoral program that advances interdisciplinary scientific research. The Fellowship equips participants with tools and expertise to drive new discoveries to benefit human and planetary health.

In 2019, Wendy and Eric Schmidt funded the rebuilding and expansion of historic Guyot Hall at Princeton University’s Department of Computer Science. The new building will be renamed ‘Eric and Wendy Schmidt Hall’, with construction scheduled to be complete in 2026.

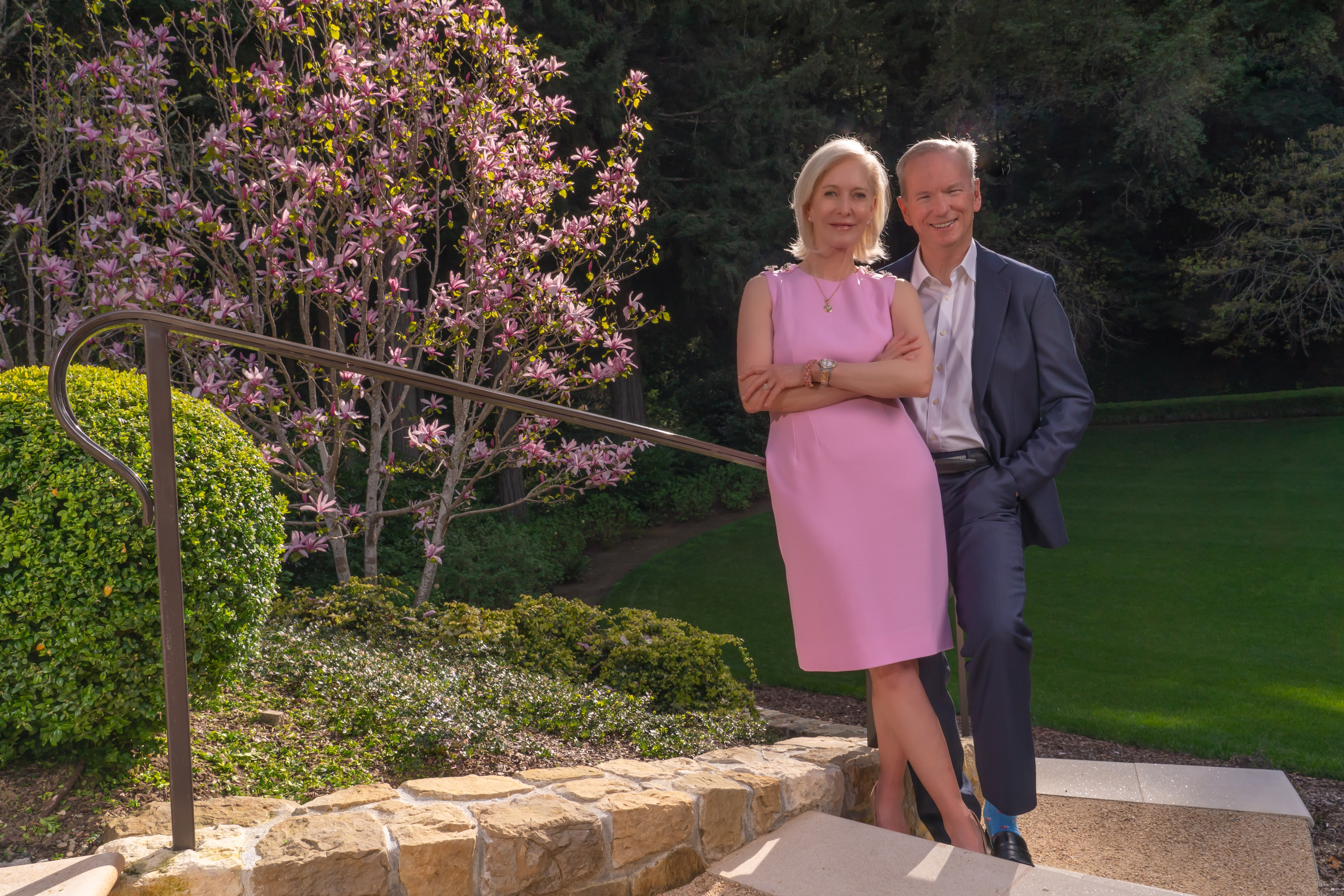
Wendy and Eric Schmidt in 2024.

In 2021, the Schmidts gave $150 million to establish the Eric and Wendy Schmidt Center at the Broad Institute. The center combines machine learning and biology research on human health.

In 2022, the Schmidts donated $12.6 million to establish the Eric and Wendy Schmidt Center for Data Science and the Environment at UC Berkeley.

In 2024, Schmidt and her husband co-founded Schmidt Sciences.

=== Arts and communications ===
Schmidt and journalist Chip Giller co-founded Agog: The Immersive Media Institute, a nonprofit organization, in 2024.

In 2025, the Schmidt Family Foundation joined a philanthropic effort to provide emergency funding to support the Public Media Company after the loss of federal funding. As part of these efforts, the foundation helped to establish the Public Media Bridge Fund, beginning with a planning grant made to the Public Media Company before the federal funding cuts. That fund provides emergency grants to help build sustainability for public media.

In 2024, the Museum of Contemporary Art, Los Angeles announced the Eric and Wendy Schmidt Environment and Art Prize, an unrestricted $100,000 honorarium supporting artists who contribute to the dialogue surrounding climate, conservation and sustainability.

She is a co-founder and board member of Climate Central.

== Personal life ==
Schmidt met her future husband, Eric, in 1977 while both were attending graduate school at Berkeley. He is the former CEO of Google. They were married in June 1980 and together they have two children, including Sophie Schmidt.

Schmidt has been a competitive sailor since 2007, and is skipper of Deep Blue. In 2022, she won the 54th Barcolana regatta, becoming the first American and first woman to win the world's largest sailing race.

Schmidt has supported political causes in California. She funded a campaign to save a California law banning new oil and gas wells within 3,200 feet of schools, parks and other neighborhood locations.
