= Schmidt Sciences =

Philanthropic organization

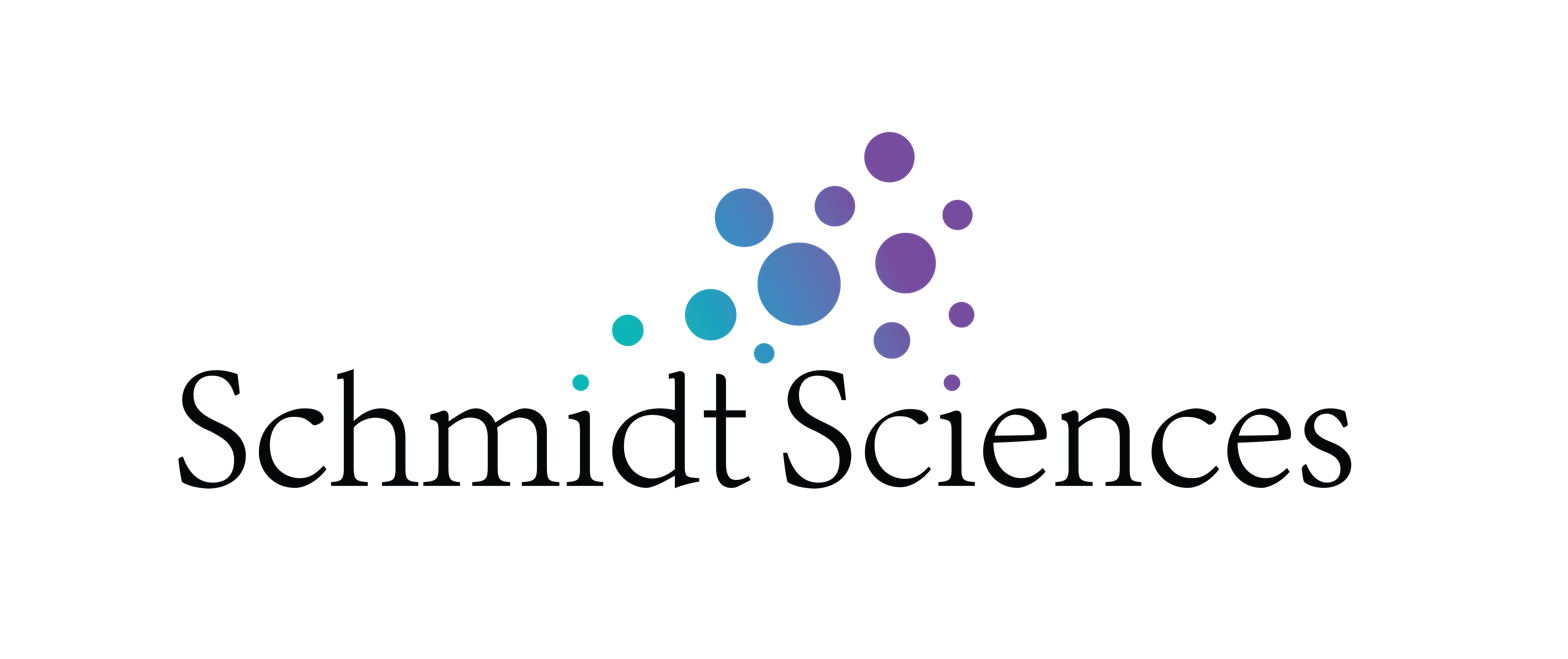
- Formation: 2024
- Founders: Eric Schmidt, Wendy Schmidt
- Type: Nonprofit organization
- Region served: Worldwide
- Parent organization: Schmidt Futures
- Affiliations: Schmidt Ocean Institute
- Remarks: Supports AI2050 fellowship, Ocean Biogeochemistry Virtual Institute (OBVI), and AI science safety research

Schmidt Sciences is a philanthropic organization established in 2024 to fund unconventional research in science and technology. Founded by Eric Schmidt and Wendy Schmidt, the nonprofit is a spin-off of the philanthropic organization Schmidt Futures.

Schmidt Sciences awards the AI2050 academic fellowship which asks scholars to imagine a future in which AI has benefited society. The Schmidts have committed $125 million to the AI2050 program over five years. The organization also partners with Schmidt Ocean Institute to support the Ocean Biogeochemistry Virtual Institute (OBVI).

In 2025, Schmidt Sciences announced a new $10 million venture to fund scientific research into safety problems in AI. The AI science safety program includes 27 projects. Awardees announced in February 2025 included computer scientist Yoshua Bengio, who is developing AI risk mitigation technology, and Zico Kolter, an OpenAI board member, exploring AI attacks.

In January 2026, Schmidt Sciences announced four astronomical projects: a private space telescope, Lazuli, with a proposed launch date in 2028; the Argus Array, an array of 1,200 telescopes that can "mimic the effect of an 8 meter optical telescope" (likely in Texas); Deep Synoptic Array radio telescope of 1,600 dishes in Nevada; and LFAST, an instrument for large aperture spectroscopy intended for biosignature search (likely in Arizona).
