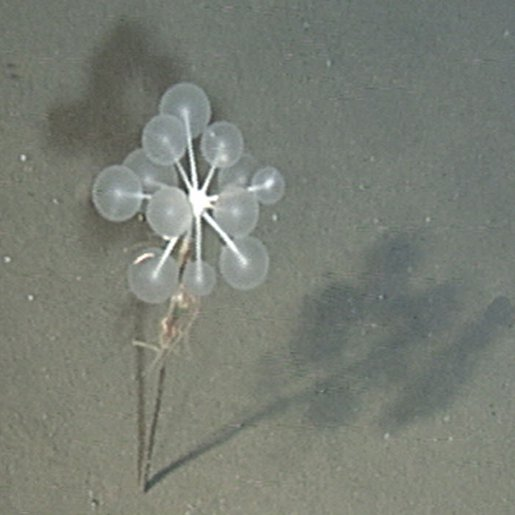
- The ping-pong tree sponge, Chondrocladia lampadiglobus

Scientific classification
- Kingdom: Animalia
- Phylum: Porifera
- Class: Demospongiae
- Order: Poecilosclerida
- Family: Cladorhizidae
- Genus: Chondrocladia; Thomson, 1873

Species
- 33; see text

Synonyms
- Crinorhiza Schmidt, 1880; Meliiderma Ridley & Dendy, 1887

= Chondrocladia =

Ping pong ball sponges Temporal range: Pleistocene(?) to Present day

Genus of sponges

Chondrocladia, the ping pong ball sponges, is a genus of carnivorous tree sponges of the family Cladorhizidae. Neocladia was long considered a junior synonym, but has recently become accepted as a distinct genus.

Thirty-three named species are placed in this genus at present, but at least two additional undescribed ones are known to exist, while some of the described ones are known only from a few specimens or (e.g. the enigmatic Chondrocladia occulta) just a single one, and their validity and/or placement in Chondrocladia is doubtful. Chondrocladia sponges are stipitate, with a stalk frequently anchored in the substrate by rhizoids and an egg-shaped body, sometimes with branches that end in inflatable spheres.

Fossils assignable to this genus are known since the Pleistocene, less than two million years ago. However, given its deep sea habitat, Chondrocladia may well have been around for much longer – it existed perhaps as early as the Mesozoic Era, as characteristic spicules (termed "microcricorhabds" or "trochirhabds"), almost identical to those of some living Chondrocladia, are known from Early Jurassic rocks almost two hundred million years old.

== Carnivory ==
These sponges gained media attention when a new species, a gourd-shaped carnivorous sponge, was featured in reports of finds off the coast of Antarctica. The new Chondrocladia was one of seventy-six sponge species identified in the seas off Antarctica by the Antarctic Benthic Deep-Sea Biodiversity Project (ANDEEP) between 2002 and 2005, conducted aboard the German research vessel Polarstern.

Carnivorous sponges, which use hooked spicules to capture small crustaceans, have been known only since 1995, when Asbestopluma hypogea, another genus of the family Cladorhizidae, was identified in Mediterranean sea caves offshore La Ciotat (France) by Jean Vacelet and Nicole Boury-Esnault. Carnivory has since turned out to be common and typical for this sponge family. Unlike their relatives, Chondrocladia still possesses the water flow system and choanocytes typical of sponges, albeit highly modified to inflate balloon-like structures that are used for capturing prey.

== Species ==
The known species of Chondrocladia are:

- Chondrocladia albatrossi Tendal, 1973
- Chondrocladia amphactis (Schmidt, 1880)
- Chondrocladia antarctica Hentschel, 1914
- Chondrocladia arenifera Brøndsted, 1929
- Chondrocladia asigmata Lévi, 1964
- Chondrocladia burtoni Tendal, 1973
- Chondrocladia clavata Ridley & Dendy, 1886
- Chondrocladia concrescens (Schmidt, 1880)
- Chondrocladia crinita Ridley & Dendy, 1886
- Chondrocladia dichotoma Lévi, 1964
- Chondrocladia fatimae Boury-Esnault & Van Beveren, 1982
- Chondrocladia gigantea (Hansen, 1885)
- Chondrocladia gracilis Lévi, 1964
- Chondrocladia grandis (Verrill, 1879)
- Chondrocladia guiteli Topsent, 1904
- Chondrocladia koltuni Vacelet, 2006
- Chondrocladia lampadiglobus Vacelet, 2006 – Ping-pong tree Sponge
- Chondrocladia latrunculioides Lopes, Bravo & Hajdu, 2011
- Chondrocladia levii Cristobo, Urgorri & Ríos, 2005
- Chondrocladia lyra Lee et al., 2012
- Chondrocladia magna Tanita, 1965
- Chondrocladia latrunculioides Lopes, Bravo & Hajdu, 2011
- Chondrocladia multichela Lévi, 1964
- Chondrocladia nani Boury-Esnault & Van Beveren, 1982
- Chondrocladia nicolae Cristobo, Urgorri & Ríos, 2005
- Chondrocladia occulta (Lehnert, Stone & Heimler, 2006)
- Chondrocladia pulvinata Lévi, 1964
- Chondrocladia rogersi Hestetun, Rapp & Xavier, 2017
- Chondrocladia robertballardi Cristobo, Rios, Pomponi & Xavier, 2015
- Chondrocladia saffronae Goodwin, Berman, Downey & Hendry, 2017
- Chondrocladia schlatteri Lopes, Bravo & Hajdu, 2011
- Chondrocladia scolionema Lévi, 1993
- Chondrocladia stipitata Ridley & Dendy, 1886
- Chondrocladia tasmaniensis Vacelet, Kelly & Schlacher-Hoenlinger, 2009
- Chondrocladia turbiformis Vacelet, Kelly & Schlacher-Hoenlinger, 2009
- Chondrocladia vaceleti Cristobo, Urgorri & Ríos, 2005
- Chondrocladia verticillata Topsent, 1920
- Chondrocladia virgata Thomson, 1873 (type species)
- Chondrocladia yatsui Topsent, 1930

An undescribed species of Chondrocladia was observed off Montagu Island in the Southern Ocean; it has been dubbed the "death-ball sponge" by the media.

C. alaskensis and C. pulchra are better placed in Crambe or Monanchora.

C. dura, C. ramosa and C. sessilis are junior synonyms of Iotrochota purpurea.

C. flabelliformis is now in Neocladia.
