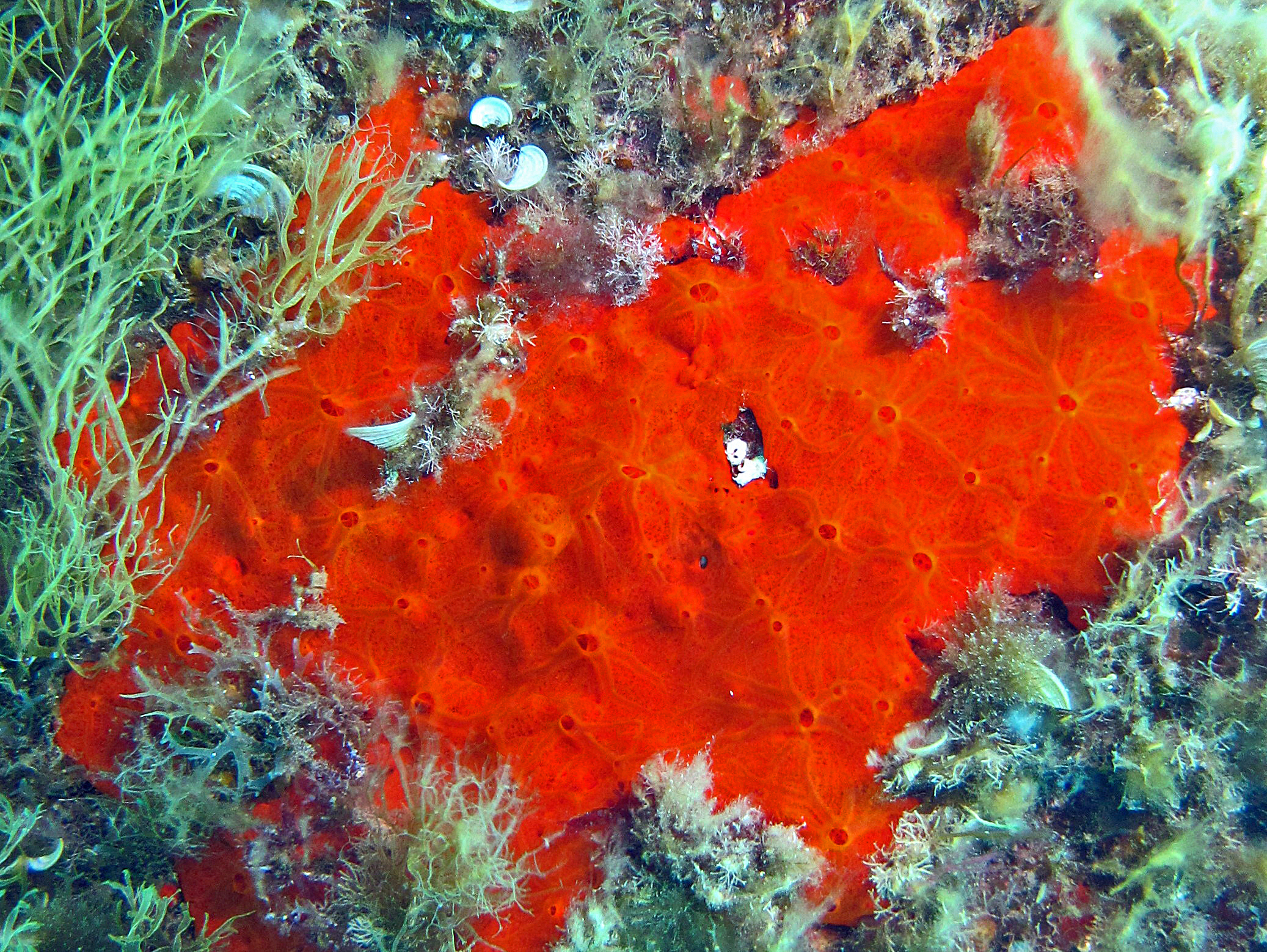
- Crambe crambe from Elba

Scientific classification
- Domain: Eukaryota
- Kingdom: Animalia
- Phylum: Porifera
- Class: Demospongiae
- Order: Poecilosclerida
- Family: Crambeidae
- Genus: Crambe
- Species: C. crambe

Binomial name
- Crambe crambe (Schmidt, 1862)

Synonyms
- List: Clathria labyrinthica (Schmidt, 1864); Crambe ambigua (Sarà, 1960); Desmacidon harpago Vosmaer, 1880; Dictyonella labyrinthica (Schmidt, 1864); Haliclona labyrinthica (Schmidt, 1864); Hemimycale ambigua Sarà, 1960; Hemimycale brevicuspis (Topsent, 1892); Plicatella labyrinthica (Schmidt, 1864); Reniera labyrinthica Schmidt, 1864; Stylinos brevicuspis Topsent, 1892; Suberites arcicola Schmidt, 1862; Suberites crambe Schmidt, 1862; Suberites fruticosus Schmidt, 1862; Tetranthella fruticosa (Schmidt, 1862)

= Crambe crambe =

Species of sponge

Crambe crambe, commonly known as the oyster sponge or orange-red encrusting sponge, is a species of demosponges belonging to the family Crambeidae.

== Description ==
The colonies of Crambe crambe form thin orange to orange-red plates, rarely lobed, with a very rough surface perforated by raised oscula found along the exhaling channels. These colonies can cover a surface of 1 m^{2}.

== Biology ==
Crambe crambe feeds by filtering bacteria, microorganisms and single-celled algae. This species is hermaphrodite. Larvae are planktonic. These demosponges often cover the shell of live shellfish (Arca noae, Spondylus and various sedentary bivalves). Eupolymnia nebulosa sometimes hides itself on these sponges.

== Distribution ==
This species is endemic to the Mediterranean, but it is also present in the North Atlantic Ocean, in the English Channel and in the North Sea.

== Habitat ==
Crambe crambe commonly occurs in well-lit waters on hard substrate at depths of 5 to 30 m.

== Gallery ==
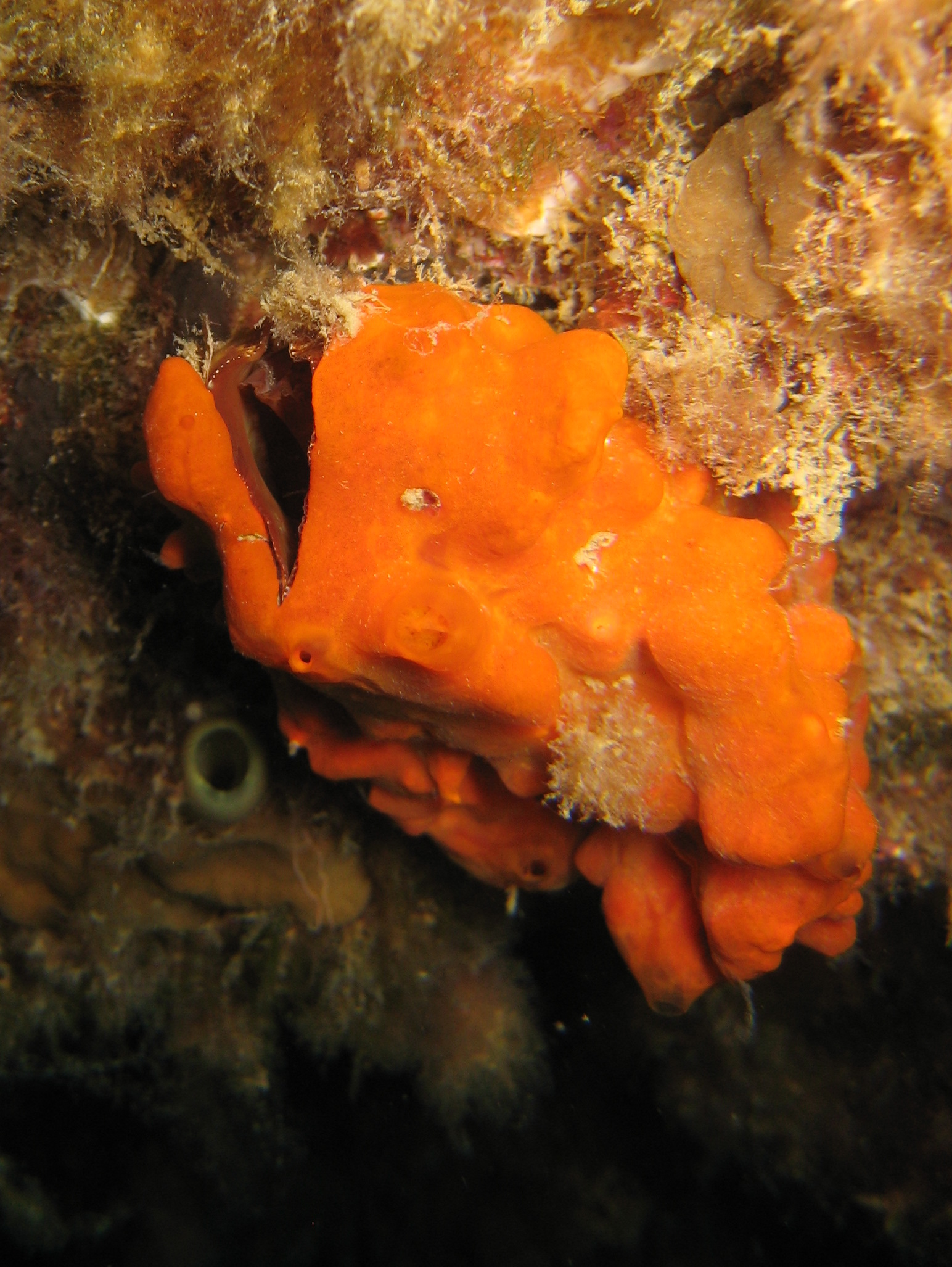
Arca noae coveded by Crambe crambe

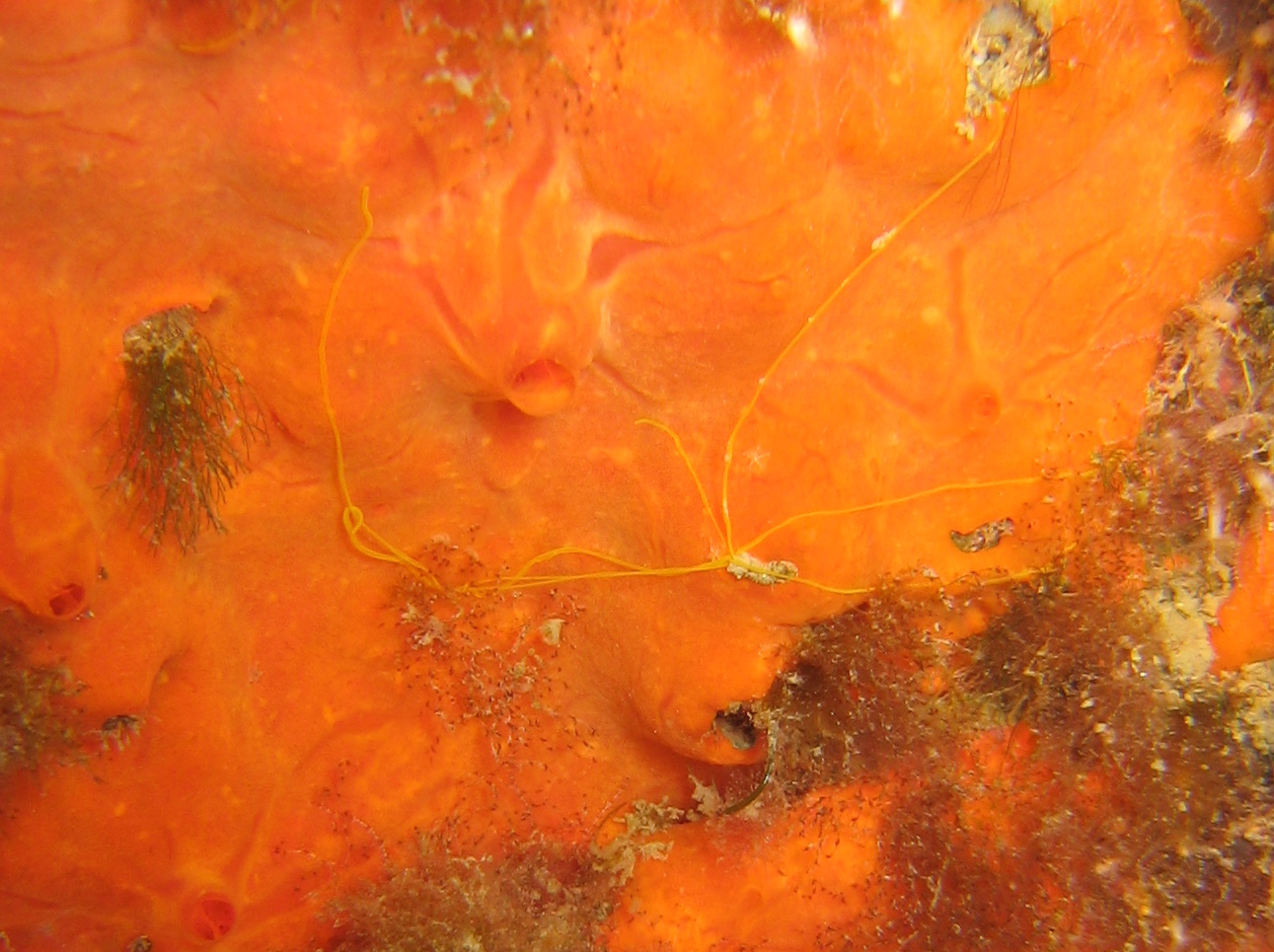
Eupolymnia nebulosa on Crambe crambe

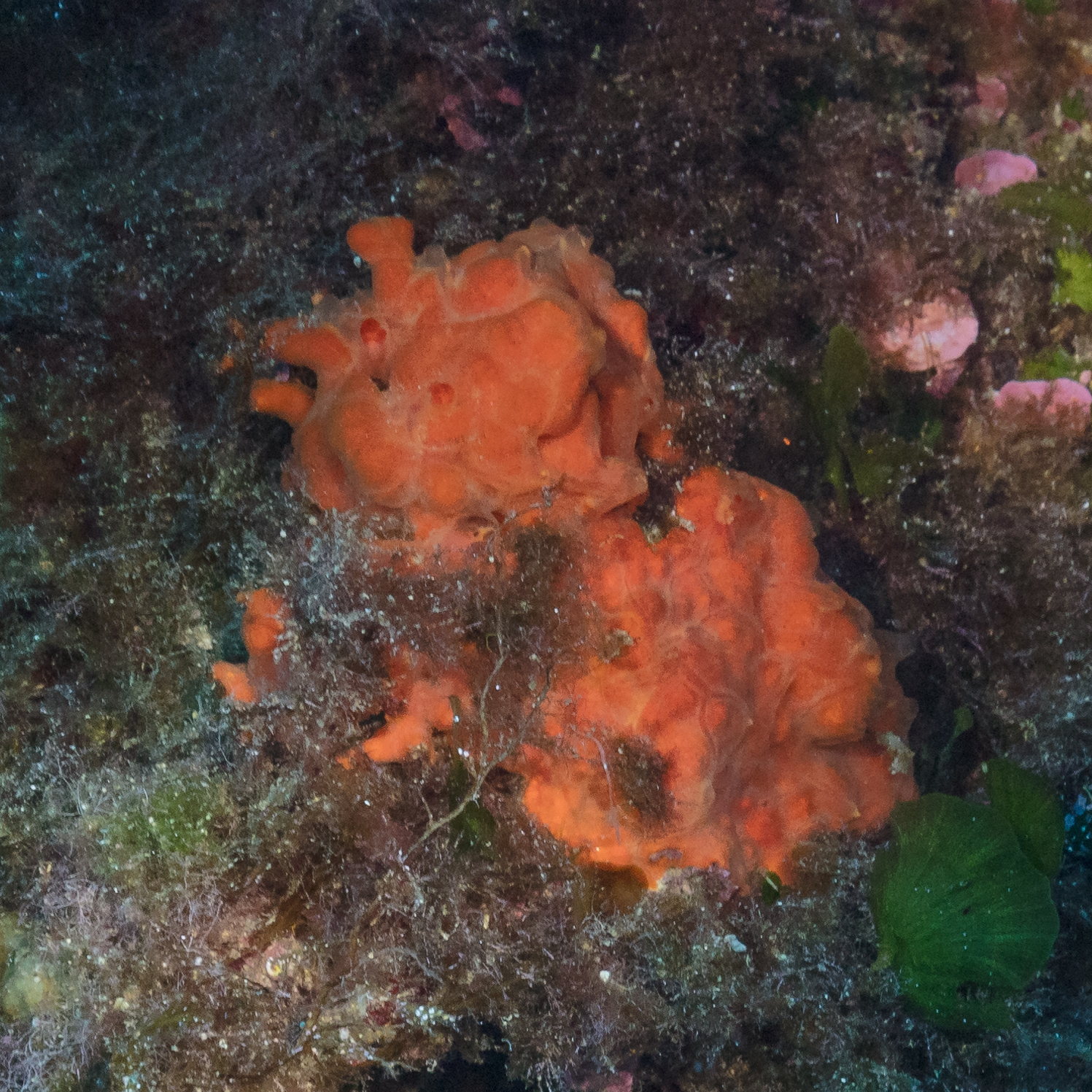
Crambe crambe

== Bibliography ==
- Babiç, K. 1922. Monactinellida und Tetractinellida des Adriatischen Meeres. Zoologische Jahrbücher. Abteilung für Systematik, Geographie und Biologie der Tiere 46(2): 217-302, pls 8-9.
- Barnes D.K.A.; Bell, J.J. (2002) Coastal sponge communities of the West Indian Ocean: taxonomic affinities, richness and diversity., Afr. J. Ecol. 40: 337-349
- Burton, M. (1956) The sponges of West Africa., Atlantide Report (Scientific Results of the Danish Expedition to the Coasts of Tropical West Africa, 1945-1946, Copenhagen) 4: 111-147.
- Lendenfeld, R. Von (1894) Die Tetractinelliden der Adria. (Mit einem Anhange über die Lithistiden)., Denkschriften der Kaiserlichen Akademieder Wissenschaften.Wien. Mathematisch-Naturwissenschaften Klasse 61: 91-204, pls I-VIII.
- Ben Mustapha, K.; Zarrouk, S.; Souissi, A.; El Abed, A. (2003). "Diversité des demosponges tunisiennes". Bull. Inst. Natn. Scien. Tech. Mer de Salanmbo (in French). 30. hdl:1834/1077. ISSN 0330-0080.
- Pansini, M. (1987) Littoral demosponges from the banks of the Strait of Sicily and the Alboran Sea.,
- Sarà, M. (1960) Poriferi del litorale dell’isola d’lschia e loro ripartizioneper ambienti., Pubblicazioni della Stazione zoologica di Napoli 31(3):421-472, pls XII-XIII.
- Sarà, M.; Siribelli, L. (1960) La fauna di Poriferi delle ‘secche’ del Golfo di Napoli. 1. La ‘secca’ della Gaiola., Annuario dell’Istituto e Museo de Zoologia dell’Università di Napoli 12(3): 1-93.
- Schmidt, O. (1862) Die Spongien des adriatischen Meeres., (Wilhelm Engelmann: Leipzig): i-viii, 1-88, pls 1-7.
- Schmidt, O. (1864) Supplement der Spongien des adriatischen Meeres. Enthaltend die Histologie und systematische Ergänzungen., (Wilhelm Engelmann: Leipzig): i-vi, 1-48, pls 1-4.
- Topsent, E. (1892) Diagnoses d’éponges nouvelles de la Méditerranée et plus particulièrement de Banyuls., Archives de Zoologie expérimentale et générale (2) 10 (Notes et Revue 6) xvii-xxviii.
- Van Soest, R.W.M. (1990) Monanchora stocki n. sp. (Porifera, Poecilosclerida) from the Mid-Atlantic Islands., Bijdragen tot de Dierkunde 60 (3-4): 249-255
- Van Soest, R.W.M. (2001) Porifera, in: Costello, M.J. et al. (Ed.) (2001)., European register of marine species: a check-list of the marine species in Europe and a bibliography of guides to their identification. Collection Patrimoines Naturels, 50:
- Van Soest, R.W.M. (2002) Family Crambeidae Lévi, 1963.
- Vosmaer, G.C.J. (1880) The Sponges of the Leyden Museum. 1. The family of the Desmacidinae., Notes from the Leyden Museum 2: 99-164.
