= Brain sponge =

Scientific classification
- Kingdom: Animalia
- Phylum: Porifera
- Class: Demospongiae
- Order: Poecilosclerida
- Family: Isodictyidae
- Genus: Isodictya
- Species: I. elastica

Binomial name
- Isodictya elastica (Vosmaer, 1880)

Synonyms
- Desmacidon elastica Vosmaer, 1880; Homoeodictya elastica (Vosmaer, 1880)

Species of sponge

The brain sponge (Isodictya elastica) is a species of marine demosponge in the family Isodictyidae. It is present from the west coast of South Africa to Port Elizabeth. It is endemic to this region.

== Description ==
The brain sponge may grow to 20 centimetres (7.9 in) across. It has a smooth surface, covered with many scattered oscula. It may be beige to pink in colour and grows in two forms: one massive and convoluted, rather like a brain, and the other with narrowing fingers. Its texture is soft and compressible.

== Habitat ==
This sponge lives on rocky reefs subtidally to 25 metres (82 ft).
