= Tetrapocillon kurushimensis =

Scientific classification
- Kingdom: Animalia
- Phylum: Porifera
- Class: Demospongiae
- Order: Poecilosclerida
- Family: Guitarridae
- Genus: Tetrapocillon
- Species: T. kurushimensis

Binomial name
- Tetrapocillon kurushimensis Tanita, 1961

Species of sponge

Tetrapocillon kurushimensis is a species of demosponge belonging to the family Guitarridae.

The species was first described in 1961 by Senji Tanita,

The species epithet, kurushimensis, describes it as being found in the Kurushima Strait of Japan. It is also found in seas off the Korean Peninsula.
