= Fibulia ramosa =

Scientific classification
- Kingdom: Animalia
- Phylum: Porifera
- Class: Demospongiae
- Order: Poecilosclerida
- Family: Dendoricellidae
- Genus: Fibulia
- Species: F. ramosa

Binomial name
- Fibulia ramosa (Ridley & Dendy, 1886)

Synonyms
- Desmacidon ramosa (Ridley & Dendy, 1886); Desmacidon ramosum (Ridley & Dendy, 1886); Isodictya ramosa (Ridley & Dendy, 1886); Plumocolumella ramosa (Ridley & Dendy, 1886)

Species of sponge

Fibulia ramosa, or the columnar sponge, is a species of deep-sea demosponge from the southern hemisphere.

== Description ==
The columnar sponge grows upright, made up by somewhat fused pale orange-brown column branches. These may become curved or twisted. It typically reaches a length of up to 60 mm (2.4 in) and a width of up to 40 mm (1.6 in). The surface is covered by small cone-like projections and has a sandpapery texture. The sponge is a firm, tough and leathery structure.

== Distribution and habitat ==
This species is found of the coasts of south-western Africa, as well as off the Prince Edward Islands. It is known to be one of the most common sponge species off the West Coast of South Africa, where it has been found growing on soft sediments. This is a deep water species and is typically found at a depth of 91–287 m (299–942 ft). It has, however, also been found growing on holdfasts in kelp forests.
