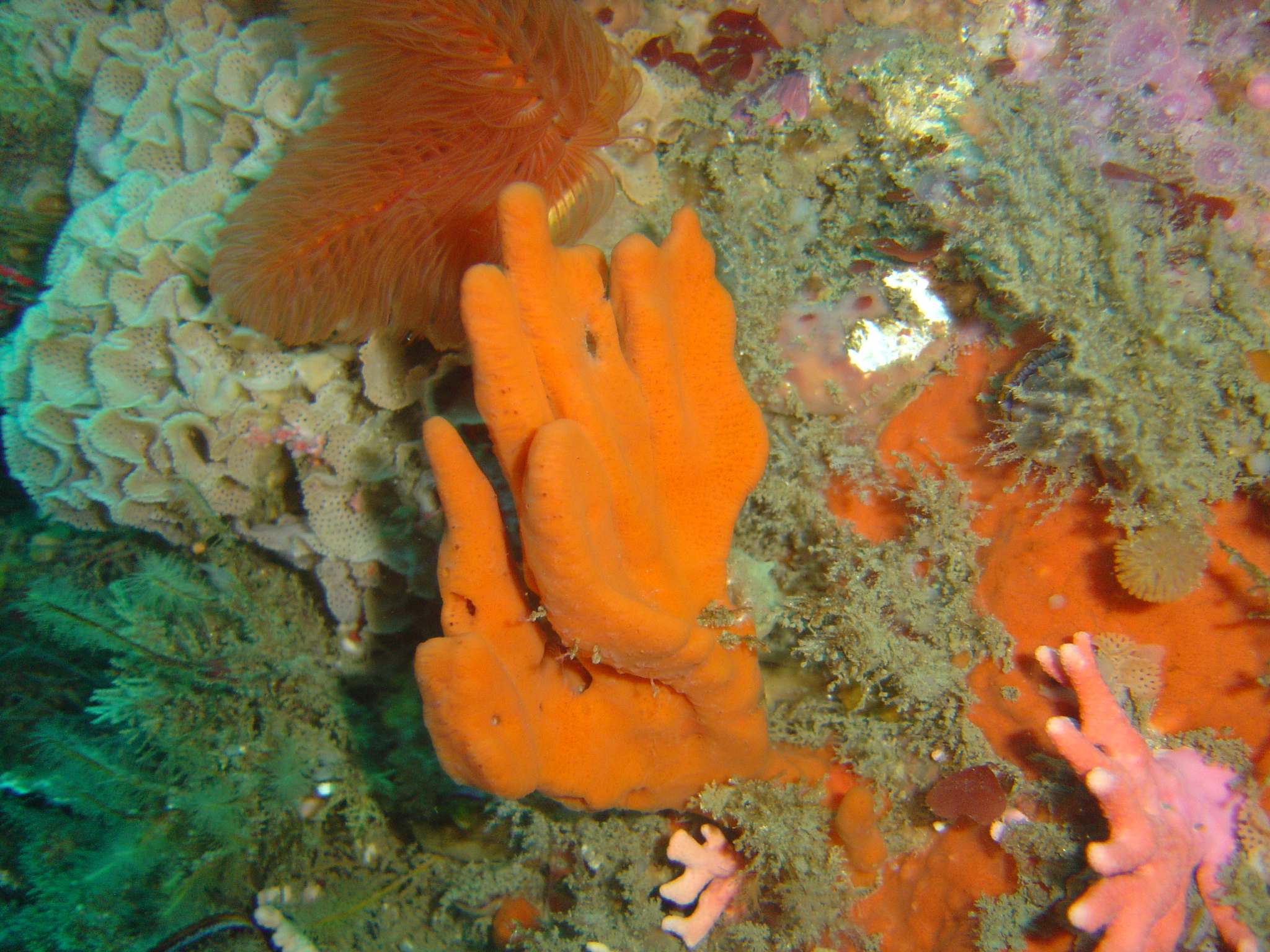

Scientific classification
- Kingdom: Animalia
- Phylum: Porifera
- Class: Demospongiae
- Order: Poecilosclerida
- Family: Isodictyidae
- Genus: Isodictya
- Species: I. grandis

Binomial name
- Isodictya grandis (Ridley & Dendy, 1886)

Synonyms
- Desmacidon grandis (Ridley & Dendy, 1886); Homoeodictya grandis Ridley & Dendy, 1886

= Flat leaf sponge =

Species of sponge

The flat leaf sponge (Isodictya grandis) is a species of marine demosponge in the family Isodictyidae. This sponge is known from the west coast of South Africa to False Bay. It is endemic to this region.

== Description ==
The flat leaf sponge may grow to 1 cm thick and 20 cm high. It is an erect, thin-bladed sponge, with the blades narrowing to points at the tips. Its texture is smooth but slightly hairy with small oscula on the blade edges. It is orange-red in colour.

== Habitat ==
This sponge lives on rocky reefs from 15-37m.
