= Tedania aurantiaca =

Scientific classification
- Kingdom: Animalia
- Phylum: Porifera
- Class: Demospongiae
- Order: Poecilosclerida
- Family: Tedaniidae
- Genus: Tedania
- Species: T. aurantiaca

Binomial name
- Tedania aurantiaca Goodwin, Brewin & Brickle, 2012

Species of sponge

Tedania aurantiaca is a species of sea sponge first found on the coast of South Georgia island, in the south west Southern Ocean.
