= Tedania elegans =

Scientific classification
- Kingdom: Animalia
- Phylum: Porifera
- Class: Demospongiae
- Order: Poecilosclerida
- Family: Tedaniidae
- Genus: Tedania
- Species: T. elegans

Binomial name
- Tedania elegans (Lendenfeld, 1888)

Synonyms
- List: Clathrissa elegans Lendenfeld, 1888; Tedania (Tedania) elegans (Lendenfeld, 1888)

Species of sponge

Tedania elegans is a species of sea sponge in the family Tedaniidae found in Australia.
