= Tedania wellsae =

Scientific classification
- Kingdom: Animalia
- Phylum: Porifera
- Class: Demospongiae
- Order: Poecilosclerida
- Family: Tedaniidae
- Genus: Tedania
- Species: T. wellsae

Binomial name
- Tedania wellsae Goodwin, Brewin & Brickle, 2012

Species of sponge

Tedania wellsae is a species of sea sponge first found on the coast of South Georgia island, in the south west Southern Ocean.
