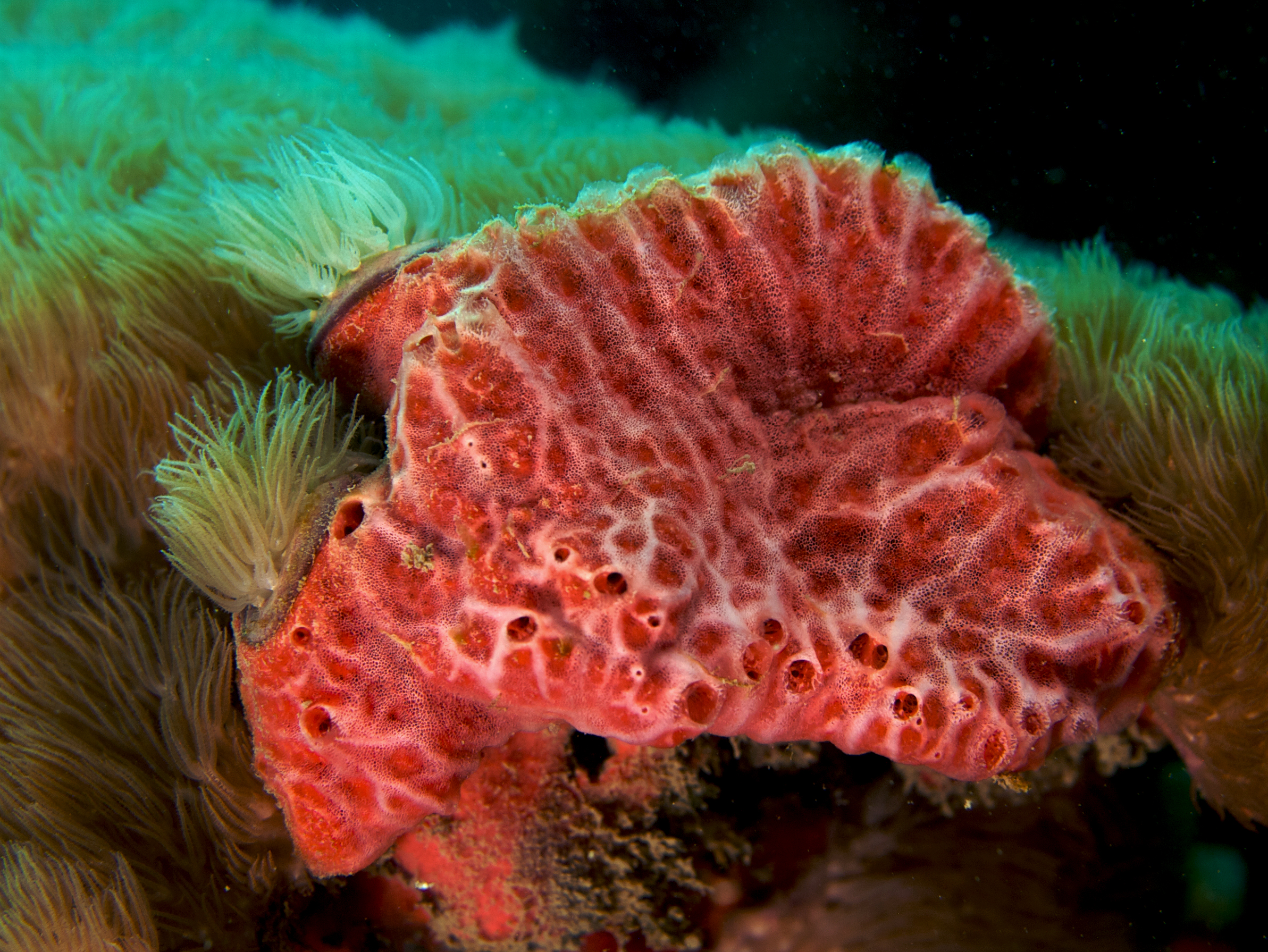

Scientific classification
- Kingdom: Animalia
- Phylum: Porifera
- Class: Demospongiae
- Order: Poecilosclerida
- Family: Crambeidae
- Genus: Monanchora; Carter

= Monanchora =

Genus of demosponges

Monanchora is a genus of demosponges belonging to the family Crambeida. The genus contains 18 species, which have been researched for their potential use in medicine.

== Description ==
=== Morphology ===
The species with in Monanchora vary in their morphology. The genus Monanchora is defined by belonging to the family Crambeidae while lacking pseudoatrose spicules. The structure of the species belonging to the genus Monachora varies from encrusting to lobate to ramose. A typical identifying characteristic of this genus is a canal system that is swollen and has a light colored lining. This canal system collapses when taken out of water. Species in this genus have simple skeletal arrangements that can develop bushes at the surface without the use of ectosomal skeletons. The spicules observed vary among and within species and can be categorized by size into two groups: megascleres and microscleres. In some species the microscleres may be reduced, absent or modified, resulting in problematic identification and assignment to the genus Monanchora. The genus Monachora and the genus Crambe are similar in morphology and chemistry. Even though the two are very similar, Monanchora lack the desma-like spicules that Crambe species have.

=== Chemistry ===
Many species of Monanchora have been researched for potential uses in the medicine. Some species produce a guanidine derived alkaloid called Monanchorin. The genus Crambe and Monanchora have similar chemical makeups.

== Distribution ==
Species belonging to the genus Monanchora are distributed around the world. They are found in shallow marine or brackish waters. They have a habitat of sea mounds or knolls.

== Discovery ==
Carter first described the genus Monanchora based on a washed up specimen of Monanchora clathrata. Due to the wave action, the specimen experienced on the shore, the shape was irregular and its structure was impossible to determine. Carter described the texture of the specimen as “crumb-of-bread” and the color as tawny. The specimen has a “sub-pinlike” skeletal arrangement and a spicule that was smooth and curved with a pointed shaft.

== Medical Use ==
A study found that Monanchora and Crambe produce pyrroloquinoline and guanidine-derived alkaloids, which potentially contain cytotoxix and antiviral, HIV-1 inhibitors, enzyme inhibitors, receptor antagonists, Calcium ion channel blockers, antifungals, and antimicrobials. These compounds are taxonomic traits of sponges in the Poecilosclerida order. These compounds are studied to investigate the potential use for cancer treatment and other therapeutic areas.

== Taxonomy ==
The following species are recognized:

- Monanchora alaskensis (Lambe, 1895)
- Monanchora arbuscula (Duchassaing & Michelotti, 1864)
- Monanchora bahamensis Esteves, de Paula, Lerner, Lôbo-Hajdu & Hajdu, 2018
- Monanchora brasiliensis Esteves, Lerner, Lôbo-Hajdu & Hajdu, 2012
- Monanchora clathrata Carter, 1883
- Monanchora coccinea Esteves, de Paula, Lerner, Lôbo-Hajdu & Hajdu, 2018
- Monanchora dianchora de Laubenfels, 1935
- Monanchora downesae Goodwin & Downey, 2021
- Monanchora enigmatica (Burton & Rao, 1932)
- Monanchora laevissima (Dendy, 1922)
- Monanchora laminachela Lehnert, Stone & Heimler, 2006
- Monanchora lipochela (Dendy, 1922)
- Monanchora megasigmifera Esteves, de Paula, Lerner, Lôbo-Hajdu & Hajdu, 2018
- Monanchora pulchra (Lambe, 1895)
- Monanchora quadrangulata (Lévi, 1958)
- Monanchora stocki van Soest, 1990
- Monanchora unguiculata (Dendy, 1922)
- Monanchora viridis (Kieschnick, 1900)
