= Angelika Brandt =

German deep-sea biologist

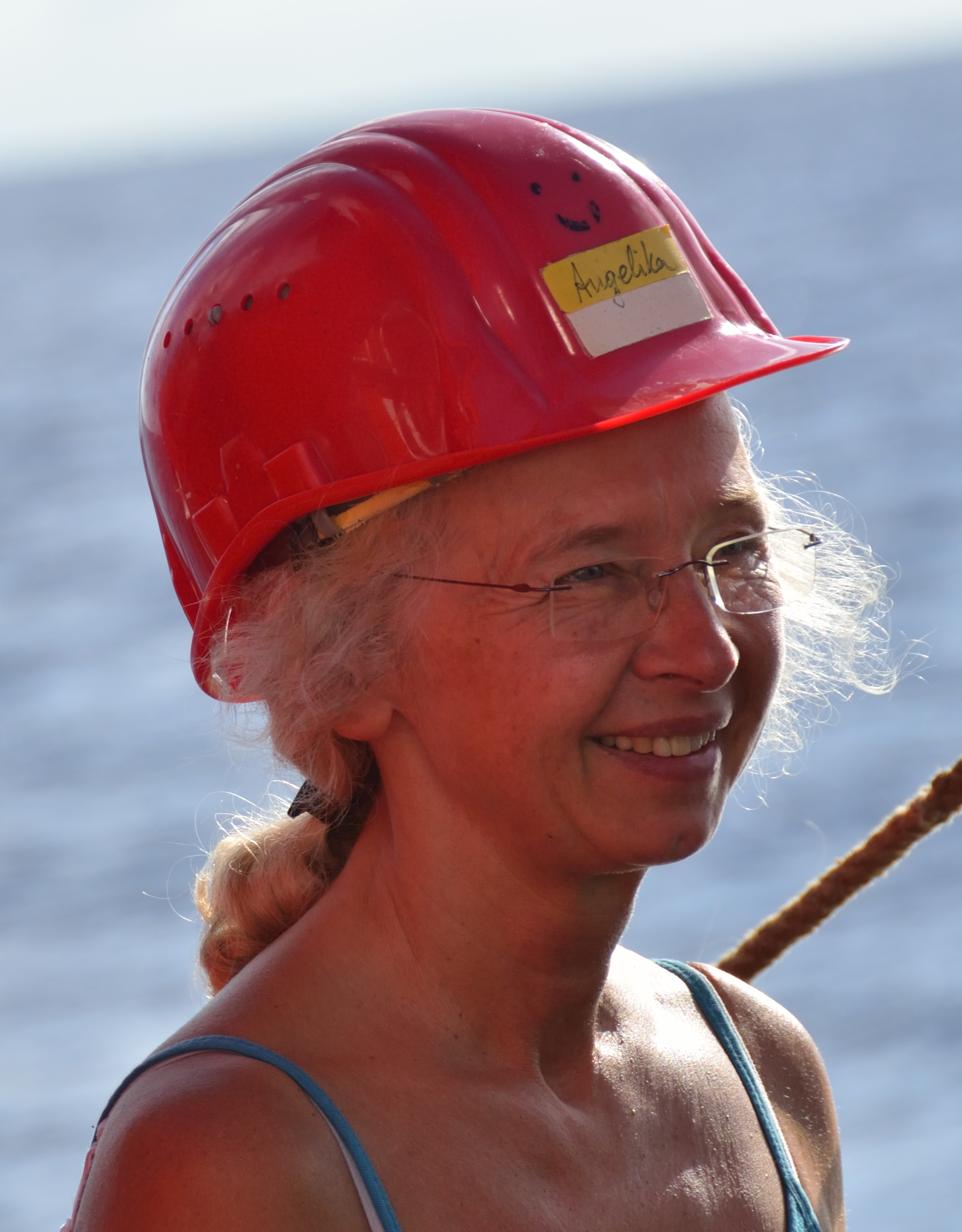
- Brandt on the RV Sonne
- Born: 6 December 1961 (age 64); Minden, Germany
- Education: University of Oldenburg
- Awards: SCAR Medal (2008); Adventurer of the year (2007)
- Scientific career
- Fields: Deep-sea biology
- Workplaces: Senckenberg Gesellschaft für Naturforschung; Goethe-University Frankfurt
- Website: hamburg.leibniz-lib.de/forschung/abteilungen/crustacea/associated-scientists/brandt.html

Angelika Brandt (born 6 December 1961) is the world leader in Antarctic deep-sea biodiversity and has developed, organised and led several oceanographic expeditions to Antarctica, notably the series of ANDEEP (ANtarctic benthic DEEP-sea biodiversity) cruises, which have contributed significantly to Antarctica and deep-sea biology. Brandt was the senior scientist of ANDEEP which was devoted entirely to benthic research in the Antarctic abyss.

== Early life and education ==
Brandt was born in Minden, Germany. She studied biology and education at the University of Oldenburg, Germany, receiving her MSc in 1987. Her PhD in zoology focussed on isopod crustaceans and was awarded in 1991, also from the University of Oldenburg. Brandt completed a post-doctoral position at the University of Kiel, Germany.

== Career and impact ==
Brandt's main research focus is macrofauna of the deep sea and polar regions. Within this broad research field she studies systematics, biodiversity, biogeography, evolution and ecology of deep-sea Isopoda (Crustacea, Malacostraca), with a special focus on Antarctic marine benthic systematics, evolution, biodiversity and biogeography.

Following her post-doc at the Institute for Polar Ecology at the University of Kiel (Germany), Brandt was appointed as professor of special zoology at the University of Hamburg in 1995. In 2003 she was appointed deputy-director and then director (2004-2009) of the Zoological Museum of the University of Hamburg, where she curated the Invertebrates II (Crustacea and Polychaeta) collection. Brandt is now the head of marine zoology of the Senckenberg Gesellschaft für Naturforschung. She is also professor at the Goethe-University Frankfurt. She has joined numerous expeditions to the polar regions, including being a participant on the maiden voyage of the RV Sonne in 2014/2015. Her work has led her to participate on over 20 research vessel and three expedition cruises.

Brandt has numerous scientific peer-reviewed articles, books, conference participations and other publications to her name. Brandt's work on the ANtarctic benthic DEEP-sea biodiversity (ANDEEP) cruises has ranged from the discovery of new life to being featured as a special issue of Deep Sea Research and reviewed in the journal Nature.

From 2011 to 2015 Brandt served on the scientific steering committee for the Southern Ocean Observing System (SOOS) and is still one of Germany's national representative at SOOS. She served as a supporting session leader for session M-2 (Southern Ocean Life and Ecology) at the Scientific Committee on Antarctic Research (SCAR) Horizon Scan retreat, and was a member of the scientific steering committee for the international and collaborative Census for the Diversity of Abyssal Marine Life (CeDAMar) and project leader and ANtarctic benthic DEEP-sea biodiversity: colonization history and recent community patterns (ANDEEP) project. She still serves as a steering committee member of the SCAR Scientific Research Program (SRP) State of the Antarctic Ecosystem AntEco. Brandt is also one of Germany's representatives to the SCAR Scientific Science Group-Life Sciences (SSG-LG). She is currently a member of the Marine Biodiversity and Ecosystem Functioning project at the EU Network of Excellence, serves as a science advisor to the Atlantic Ocean Observing System (Atlantos) and is the head of Invertebrate II collection at CeNak.

Brandt has been a fellow of the Linnean Society (UK) since 2003, a member of the Akademie der Wissenschaften und der Literatur Mainz (Germany) since 2012, the Deutsche Zoologische Gesellschaft (DZG), Deutsche Gesellschaft für Polarforschung (DGP), Gesellschaft für biologische Systematik (GfbS), the Society (TCS, USA), the Systematics Association (UK), the Biological Society of Washington, and Gesellschaft deutscher Naturforscher und Ärzte (GdNÄ). She served as European Governor to the Crustacean society (TCS, USA) from 2000 to 2002. She has also served as the deputy chair of the Deutsche Gesellschaft für Meeresforschung (DGM) and was on the advisory board of ESF ERICOM-RV Aurora Borealis Science (ESAP) Member (2009 - 2012). Brandt currently serves on the senate commission on oceanography at the German Research Foundation (DFG). She also performs advisory roles, including the Annette-Barthelt Foundation, the German Academic Exchange Service (DAAD), the Science Planning & Coordination committee of the Australian National Antarctic Research (ANARE), and the Natural Environmental Research Council (NERC) (UK). Since 2008 she has served on the editorial board for the Journal of Marine Biodiversity as well as serving on Polish Polar Research (PPR).

== Awards and honors ==
Brandt's PhD was awarded with the Annette-Barthelt Foundation science prize in 1992. She became a fellow of the Linnean Society of London in 2003. Her co-authored 2007 Nature publication was designated as 4th of the 10 most important scientific discoveries 2007 by Time magazine and she received the National Geographic Society award for Adventurer of the Year 2007. In 2008 Brandt was awarded the SCAR Medal for excellences in Polar Sciences. In 2012 Brandt was invited to give a plenary lecture at the XXXII SCAR OSC. In 2022, she received the Carlo Heip Award, which she accepted during the 6th World Conference on Marine Biodiversity in 2023.
