= Fibulia =

Scientific classification
- Kingdom: Animalia
- Phylum: Porifera
- Class: Demospongiae
- Order: Poecilosclerida
- Family: Dendoricellidae
- Genus: Fibulia (Carter, 1886)

Type species
- Fibulia carnosa Carter, 1886

Synonyms
- Plumocolumella (Burton,1929); Xytopsaga (Laubenfels, 1936)

Genus of sponges

Fibulia is a genus of sponges belonging to the family Dendoricellidae. The species of this genus are found in Southern South Hemisphere.

== Species ==
The following species are recognised:

- Fibulia anchorata (Carter, 1881)
- Fibulia carnosa Carter, 1886
- Fibulia conulissima (Whitelegge, 1906)
- Fibulia cribriporosa (Burton, 1929)
- Fibulia hispidosa (Whitelegge, 1906)
- Fibulia intermedia (Dendy, 1896)
- Fibulia maeandrina (Kirkpatrick, 1907)
- Fibulia myxillioides (Burton, 1932)
- Fibulia novaezealandiae (Brøndsted, 1924)
- Fibulia ramosa (Ridley & Dendy, 1886), Columnar sponge
