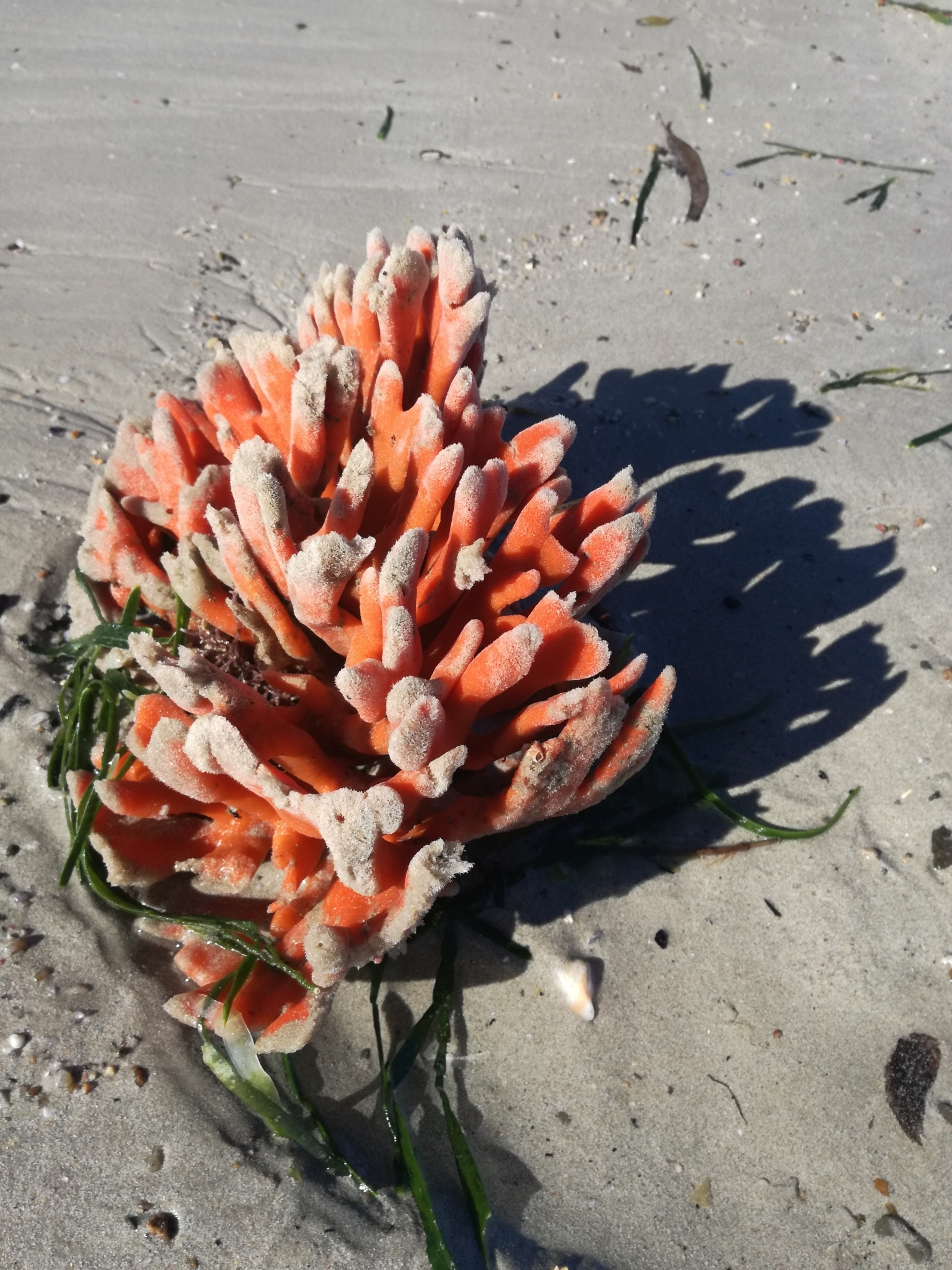
- Isodictya frondosa

Scientific classification
- Kingdom: Animalia
- Phylum: Porifera
- Class: Demospongiae
- Order: Poecilosclerida
- Family: Isodictyidae
- Genus: Isodictya; Bowerbank, 1864

Synonyms
- List: Cercidochela Kirkpatrick, 1907; Desmacidon (Homoeodictya) Ehlers, 1870; Homoeodictya Ehlers, 1870; Neoesperiopsis de Laubenfels, 1949; Textiliforma Carter, 1885; Valentis Laubenfels, 1936

= Isodictya =

Genus of sponges

Isodictya is a genus of marine demosponges in the family Isodictyidae.

== Species ==
Species in the genus include:

- Isodictya alata (Stephens, 1915)
- Isodictya aspera Bowerbank, 1877
- Isodictya bentarti Rios, Cristobo & Urgorri, 2004
- Isodictya cavicornuta Dendy, 1924
- Isodictya chichatouzae Uriz, 1984
- Isodictya compressa (Esper, 1794)
- Isodictya conulosa (Ridley & Dendy, 1886)
- Isodictya cutisanserina Goodwin, Jones, Neely & Brickle, 2016
- Isodictya deichmannae (de Laubenfels, 1949)
- Isodictya delicata (Thiele, 1905)
- Isodictya doryphora (Brøndsted, 1927)
- Isodictya dufresni Boury-Esnault & van Beveren, 1982
- Isodictya echinata Thomas & Matthew, 1986
- Isodictya ectofibrosa (Lévi, 1963)
- Isodictya elastica (Vosmaer, 1880)
- Isodictya erinacea (Topsent, 1916)
- Isodictya foliata (Carter, 1885)
- Isodictya frondosa (Lévi, 1963)
- Isodictya frondosa (Pallas, 1766)
- Isodictya grandis (Ridley & Dendy, 1886)
- Isodictya histodermella de Laubenfels, 1942
- Isodictya kerguelenensis (Ridley & Dendy, 1886)
- Isodictya lankesteri (Kirkpatrick, 1907)
- Isodictya lenta (Vosmaer, 1880)
- Isodictya microchela (Topsent, 1915)
- Isodictya multiformis (Stephens, 1915)
- Isodictya obliquidens (Hentschel, 1914)
- Isodictya palmata (Ellis & Solander, 1786)
- Isodictya porifera (Whitelegge, 1906)
- Isodictya pulviliformis (Koltun, 1955)
- Isodictya quatsinoensis (Lambe, 1893)
- Isodictya rigida (Lambe, 1893)
- Isodictya setifera (Topsent, 1901)
- Isodictya spinigera (Kirkpatrick, 1907)
- Isodictya staurophora (Hentschel, 1911)
- Isodictya toxophila Burton, 1932
- Isodictya trigona (Topsent, 1917)
- Isodictya vancouverensis (Lambe, 1893)
- Isodictya verrucosa (Topsent, 1913)
