= Chondrocladia robertballardi =

Scientific classification
- Kingdom: Animalia
- Phylum: Porifera
- Class: Demospongiae
- Order: Poecilosclerida
- Family: Cladorhizidae
- Genus: Chondrocladia
- Species: C. robertballardi

Binomial name
- Chondrocladia robertballardi Cristobo, Rios, Pomponi & Xavier, 2015

Species of carnivorous sponges

Chondrocladia robertballardi is a species of carnivorous sponges that was discovered by Cristobo, Ríos, Pomponi and Xavier in 2014, and described by them in 2015. The discovery was made in the north-east Atlantic, in the Gorringe and Galicia Banks.
