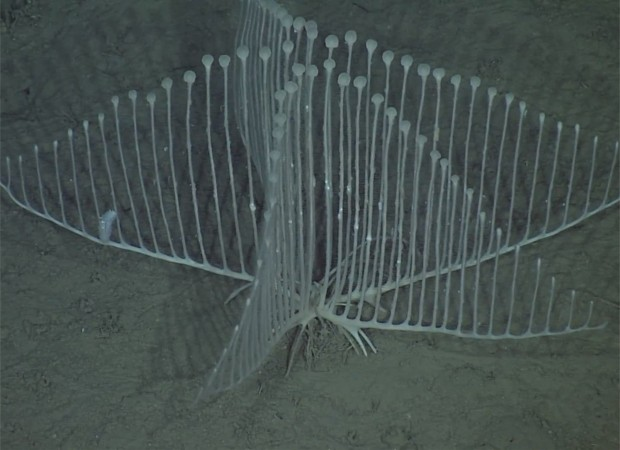

Scientific classification
- Kingdom: Animalia
- Phylum: Porifera
- Class: Demospongiae
- Order: Poecilosclerida
- Family: Cladorhizidae
- Genus: Chondrocladia
- Subgenus: Symmetrocladia; Lee et al., 2012
- Species: C. lyra

Binomial name
- Chondrocladia lyra Lee et al., 2012

= Chondrocladia lyra =

Species of sponge

Chondrocladia lyra, also known as the lyre sponge or harp sponge, is a species of carnivorous deep-sea sponge first discovered off the Californian coast living at depths of 10,800–11,500 feet (3,300–3,500 m) by Welton L. Lee, Henry M Reiswig, William C. Austin, and Lonny Lundsten from the Monterey Bay Aquarium Research Institute (MBARI).

The species was listed among the Top 10 New Species 2013 discovered in 2012 as selected by the International Institute for Species Exploration at Arizona State University out of more than 140 nominated species. The selection was publicised on 22 May 2013.

== Structure ==
Chondrocladia lyra is named the harp sponge because its basic structure resembles a lyre or harp. It is a sessile organism which anchors itself to the soft seafloor using a rhizoid, a root-like structure that embeds into the sea floor. From the top of the rhizoid, 1 to 6 horizontal, equidistant stolons with vertical branches form the "vanes" of the sponge (this is evident in all of Chondrocladia). Stolons vary from being straight to curved, often with mixtures of straight and curved stolons in the same specimen. Branches are generally shortest near the outer tip of the vanes, growing gradually longer near the center where the longest branches usually occur. Depending on the number, the vanes display pentaradiate, tetra radiate, or biradiate symmetries. The vanes give C. lyra its harp-like structure and these are covered in velcro-like hooks and spines, which it uses to snare prey that drift past it in currents. Of the specimens found, the largest recorded is nearly 60 centimeters in length.

== Feeding ==
External videos
- The harp sponge: an extraordinary new species of carnivorous sponge

Typical sponges are suspension feeders, filtering bacteria and microscopic organisms from the surrounding water through their aquiferous system. C. lyra and other carnivorous sponges, however, capture much larger prey, like copepods and other crustaceans, with the velcro-like hooks on external body surfaces. Once the hooks have ensnared the sponge's prey, it secretes a digestive membrane that surrounds and engulfs the captured prey, breaking it down until the C. lyra can absorb it through its pores.

== Reproduction ==
The vertical branches of the harp sponge are the support for filaments and terminal balls. The terminal balls are relatively large, spherical casings full of spermatophores that can fertilize other harp sponges. The spermatophores are released by the terminal balls, and sigmas protruding from the sperm are caught by protruding isochelae on the filaments.

The wide frame of C. lyra optimizes the chances for successful fertilization. It allows the sponge's sperm to have a wider range when traveling downstream. The harp sponge is also better at catching sperm due to the widened stolons thoroughly lined with filaments. When the filaments snare spermatophores, they fuse with the recipient tissues. This reaction shows a swelling in the related tissues. From these areas, oogenesis occurs, followed by the maturation of the oocytes.

== Habitat ==
Chondrocladia lyra has been found in the northeast Pacific Ocean, off the coast of northern California, at the Escanaba Ridge and the Monterey Canyon. Specimens have been found in soft abyssal sediment at depths between 3,316 and 3,399 m (10,879 and 11,152 ft), with estimates ranging between ~3,000 and 5,000 m (9,843 and 16,404 ft), attached to the seafloor using root-like rhizoid. They have been seen rooted on the sides of slopes and bottom of the Monterey Canyon, where their prey is funneled into the narrow crevasses the sponges inhabit. While it has only been observed off northern California, it likely has a much wider latitudinal range of 1,600 kilometres (990 mi) or more.
