= Pyloderma =

Scientific classification
- Domain: Eukaryota
- Kingdom: Animalia
- Phylum: Porifera
- Class: Demospongiae
- Order: Poecilosclerida
- Family: Dendoricellidae
- Genus: Pyloderma; Kirkpatrick, 1907

Genus of sponges

Pyloderma is a genus of sponges belonging to the family Dendoricellidae.

The species of this genus are found in Pacific Ocean.

Species:

- Pyloderma demonstrans Dendy, 1924
