= Phoriospongia =

Scientific classification
- Domain: Eukaryota
- Kingdom: Animalia
- Phylum: Porifera
- Class: Demospongiae
- Order: Poecilosclerida
- Family: Chondropsidae
- Genus: Phoriospongia; Marshall, 1880

Genus of sponges

Phoriospongia is a genus of sponges belonging to the family Chondropsidae.

The species of this genus are found in Malesia and Australia.

Species:

- Phoriospongia arenifibrosa (Dendy, 1896)
- Phoriospongia argentea (Marshall, 1880)
- Phoriospongia canaliculata Lendenfeld, 1889
- Phoriospongia carcinophila (Lendenfeld, 1889)
- Phoriospongia flabellopalmata (Carter, 1885)
- Phoriospongia levis Lendenfeld, 1888
- Phoriospongia mammillata (Lendenfeld, 1888)
- Phoriospongia mozambiquensis Calcinai & Belfiore, 2020
- Phoriospongia papillosa (Lamarck, 1815)
- Phoriospongia poni (de Laubenfels, 1950)
- Phoriospongia reticulum Marshall, 1880
- Phoriospongia solida Marshall, 1880
- Phoriospongia squalida (Lendenfeld, 1888)
- Phoriospongia syringiana (Whitelegge, 1906)
