= Chondropsis =

Chondropsis may refer to:

- Chondropsis (sponge), a genus of sponges in the family Chondropsidae
- Chondropsis (fungus), a genus of fungi in the family Parmeliaceae, synonym of Xanthoparmelia
- Chondropsis, a genus of plants in the family Gentianaceae, synonym of Exacum
