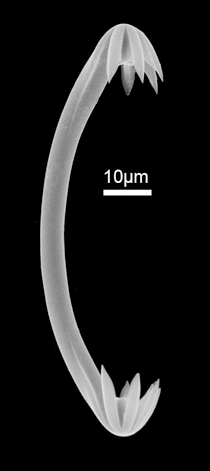

Scientific classification
- Kingdom: Animalia
- Phylum: Porifera
- Class: Demospongiae
- Order: Poecilosclerida
- Family: Cladorhizidae
- Genus: Chondrocladia
- Subgenus: Meliiderma
- Species: C. turbiformis

Binomial name
- Chondrocladia turbiformis Vacelet, Kelly & Schlacher-Hoenlinger, 2009

= Chondrocladia turbiformis =

Species of sponge

Chondrocladia turbiformis is a species of carnivorous sponge discovered in 2009.
