= Tetrapocillon =

Scientific classification
- Kingdom: Animalia
- Phylum: Porifera
- Class: Demospongiae
- Order: Poecilosclerida
- Family: Guitarridae
- Genus: Tetrapocillon; Brøndsted, 1924

Type species
- Tetrapocillon novae-zealandiae Brøndsted, 1924

Genus of sponges

Tetrapocillon is a genus of sponges belonging to the family Guitarridae.

The genus was first described in 1924 by Holger Valdemar Brøndsted, with the type species being Tetrapocillon novaezealandia.

== Species ==
Species accepted by WoRMS are:

- Tetrapocillon atlanticus van Soest, 1988
- Tetrapocillon kurushimensis Tanita, 1961
- Tetrapocillon minor Pulitzer-Finali, 1993
- Tetrapocillon novaezealandiae Brøndsted, 1924
- Tetrapocillon patbergquistae Fromont, Alvarez, Gomez & Roberts, 2011
