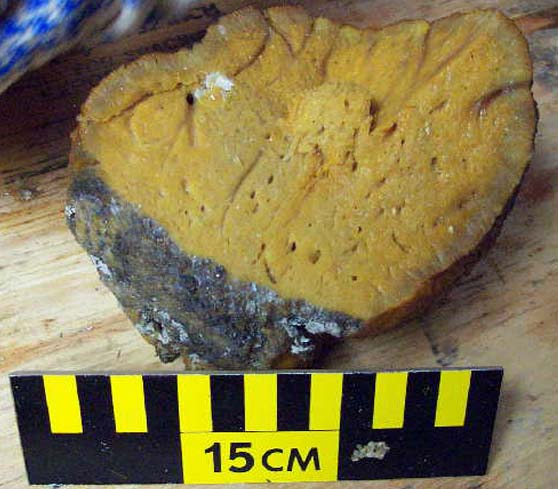
- Fire sponge (Tedaria ignis)

Scientific classification
- Kingdom: Animalia
- Phylum: Porifera
- Class: Demospongiae
- Order: Poecilosclerida
- Family: Tedaniidae
- Genus: Tedania; Gray, 1867

Species
- See text

= Tedania =

Genus of sponges

Tedania is a genus of sea sponges in the family Tedaniidae.

== Species ==
The following species are recognised in the genus Tedania:

- Subgenus Tedania (Stylotedania) Van Soest, 2017
  - Tedania folium Van Soest, 2017
- Subgenus Tedania (Tedania) Gray, 1867
  - Tedania anhelans (Vio in Olivi, 1792)
  - Tedania assabensis Keller, 1891
  - Tedania baeri Van Soest & Hooper, 2020
  - Tedania battershilli Bergquist & Fromont, 1988
  - Tedania bispinata Hentschel, 1911
  - Tedania bowerbanki Van Soest & Hooper, 2020
  - Tedania brasiliensis Mothes, Hajdu & van Soest, 2000
  - Tedania brevispiculata Thiele, 1903
  - Tedania brondstedi Burton, 1936
  - Tedania chevreuxi Topsent, 1891
  - Tedania commixta Ridley & Dendy, 1886
  - Tedania conica Baer, 1906
  - Tedania connectens (Brøndsted, 1924)
  - Tedania coralliophila Thiele, 1903
  - Tedania dirhaphis Hentschel, 1912
  - Tedania diversirhaphidiophora Brøndsted, 1924
  - Tedania elegans (Lendenfeld, 1888)
  - Tedania fibrosa Ridley & Dendy, 1887
  - Tedania flexistrongyla Koltun, 1959
  - Tedania fragilis Lambe, 1895
  - Tedania fulvum Aguilar-Camacho, Carballo & Cruz-Barraza, 2018
  - Tedania galapagensis Desqueyroux-Faúndez & van Soest, 1996
  - Tedania ignis (Duchassaing & Michelotti, 1864)
  - Tedania inermis Hentschel, 1911
  - Tedania kagalaskai Lehnert, Stone & Heimler, 2006
  - Tedania klausi Wulff, 2006
  - Tedania levigotylota Hoshino, 1981
  - Tedania livida Goodwin, Jones, Neely & Brickle, 2016
  - Tedania macrodactyla (Lamarck, 1814)
  - Tedania maeandrica Thiele, 1903
  - Tedania murdochi Topsent, 1913
  - Tedania obscurata (De Laubenfels, 1930)
  - Tedania oligostyla de Laubenfels, 1954
  - Tedania pacifica de Laubenfels, 1954
  - Tedania palola Hoshino, 1981
  - Tedania panis (Selenka, 1867)
  - Tedania pilarriosae Cristobo, 2002
  - Tedania placentaeformis Brøndsted, 1924
  - Tedania polytyla Hentschel, 1911
  - Tedania purpurescens Bergquist & Fromont, 1988
  - Tedania reticulata Thiele, 1903
  - Tedania rhoi Sim & Lee, 1998
  - Tedania rubicunda Lendenfeld, 1888
  - Tedania rudis (Bowerbank, 1875)
  - Tedania sansibarensis Baer, 1906
  - Tedania sasuensis Kim & Sim, 2005
  - Tedania scotiae Stephens, 1915
  - Tedania songakensis Kim & Sim, 2005
  - Tedania spinostylota Bergquist & Fromont, 1988
  - Tedania strongyla Li, 1986
  - Tedania strongylostyla Kennedy & Hooper, 2000
  - Tedania stylonychaeta Lévi, 1963
  - Tedania suctoria Schmidt, 1870
  - Tedania tepitootehenuaensis Desqueyroux-Faúndez, 1990
  - Tedania toxicalis De Laubenfels, 1930
  - Tedania tropicalis Aguilar-Camacho, Carballo & Cruz-Barraza, 2018
  - Tedania tubulifera Lévi, 1963
  - Tedania urgorrii Cristobo, 2002
  - Tedania verrucosa Carter, 1886
  - Tedania vulcani Lendenfeld, 1897
- Subgenus Tedania (Tedaniopsis) Dendy, 1924
  - Tedania armata Sarà, 1978
  - Tedania aurantiaca Goodwin, Brewin & Brickle, 2012
  - Tedania charcoti Topsent, 1907
  - Tedania corticata Sarà, 1978
  - Tedania cristagalli Dendy, 1924
  - Tedania gracilis Hentschel, 1914
  - Tedania gurjanovae Koltun, 1958
  - Tedania infundibuliformis Ridley & Dendy, 1886
  - Tedania laminariae Sarà, 1978
  - Tedania lanceta Koltun, 1964
  - Tedania massa Ridley & Dendy, 1886
  - Tedania mucosa Thiele, 1905
  - Tedania oxeata Topsent, 1916
  - Tedania phacellina Topsent, 1912
  - Tedania sarai Bertolino, Schejter, Calcinai, Cerrano & Bremec, 2007
  - Tedania tantula (Kirkpatrick, 1907)
  - Tedania tenuicapitata Ridley, 1881
  - Tedania triraphis Koltun, 1964
  - Tedania turbinata (Dendy, 1924)
  - Tedania vanhoeffeni Hentschel, 1914
  - Tedania wellsae Goodwin, Brewin & Brickle, 2012
- Subgenus unassigned
  - Tedania rubra Lendenfeld, 1888
