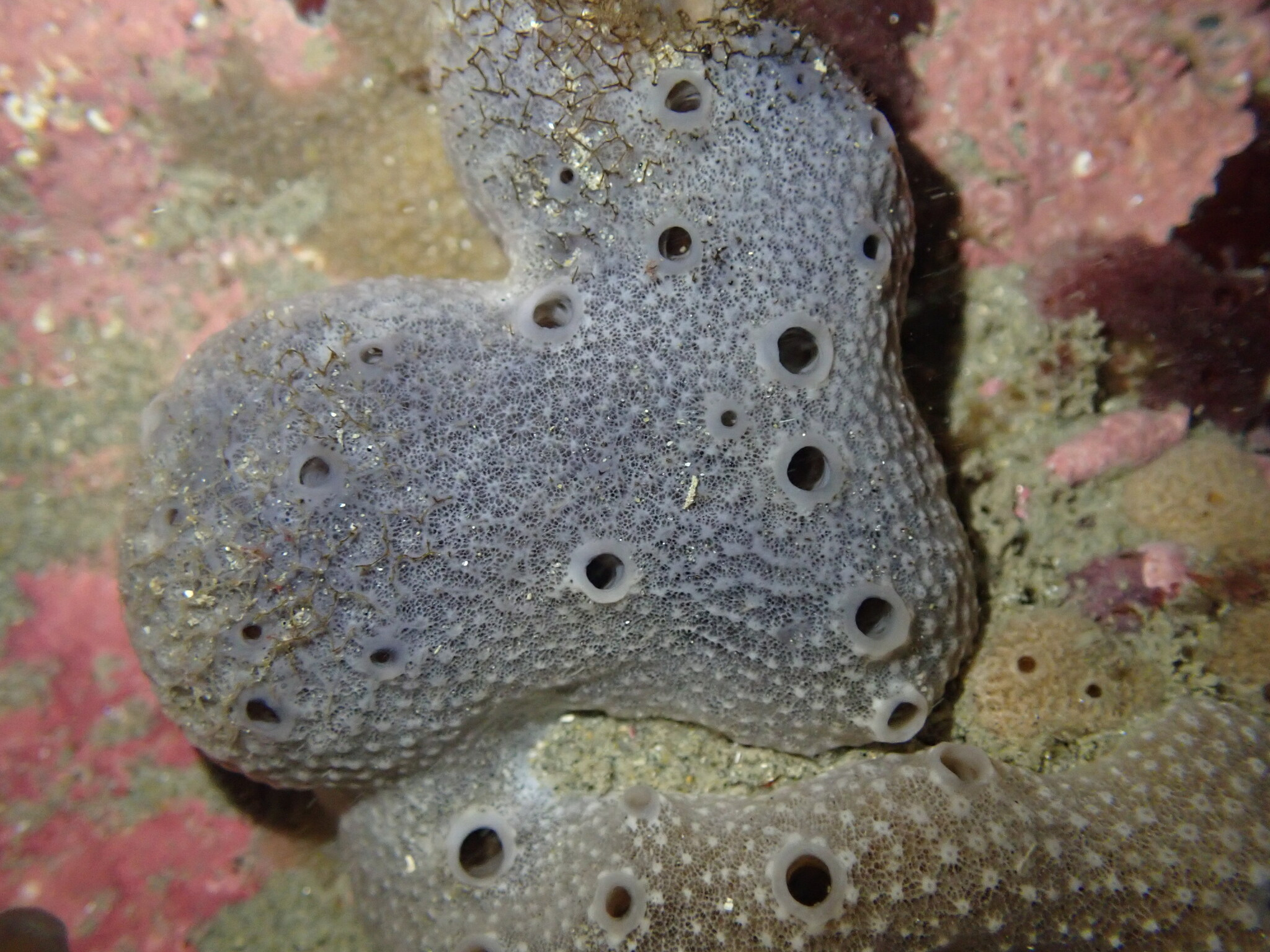
- Strongylacidon conulosum

Scientific classification
- Kingdom: Animalia
- Phylum: Porifera
- Class: Demospongiae
- Order: Poecilosclerida
- Family: Chondropsidae
- Genus: Strongylacidon; Lendenfeld, 1897

Synonyms
- Xytopsiphum de Laubenfels, 1950; Xytopsues de Laubenfels, 1936

= Strongylacidon =

Genus of sponges

Strongylacidon is a genus of sponges in the family Chondropsidae. The species of this genus are found in Southern Hemisphere.

== Species ==
The following species are recognised in the genus Strongylacidon:

- Strongylacidon bermuda (de Laubenfels, 1950)
- Strongylacidon chelospinatum Menegola, Santos, Moraes & Muricy, 2012
- Strongylacidon conulosum Bergquist & Fromont, 1988
- Strongylacidon fasciculatum Pulitzer-Finali, 1993
- Strongylacidon griseum (Schmidt, 1870)
- Strongylacidon inaequale (Hentschel, 1911)
- Strongylacidon intermedium Burton, 1934
- Strongylacidon kaneohe (de Laubenfels, 1950)
- Strongylacidon meganese (de Laubenfels, 1951)
- Strongylacidon mollissimum (Lendenfeld, 1887)
- Strongylacidon platei (Thiele, 1905)
- Strongylacidon plicatum (Hentschel, 1911)
- Strongylacidon poriticola van Soest, 1984
- Strongylacidon rubrum van Soest, 1984
- Strongylacidon sansibarense Lendenfeld, 1897
- Strongylacidon solangeae Menegola, Santos, Moraes & Muricy, 2012
- Strongylacidon stelliderma (Carter, 1886)
- Strongylacidon stelligerum (Whitelegge, 1906)
- Strongylacidon unguiferum van Soest, 2009
- Strongylacidon viride van Soest, 1984
- Strongylacidon zukerani (de Laubenfels, 1957)
