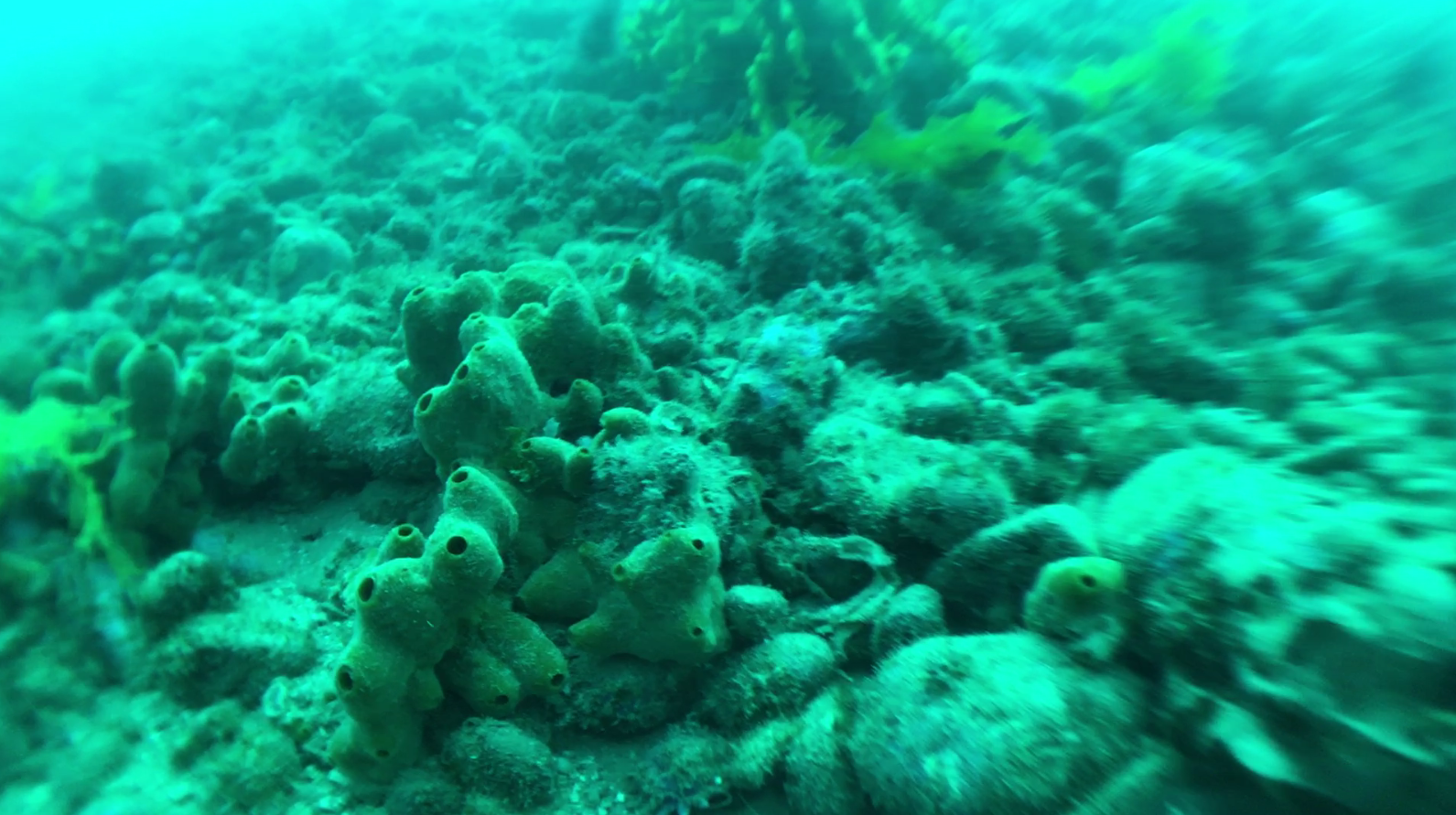
- Chondropsis kirkii

Scientific classification
- Kingdom: Animalia
- Phylum: Porifera
- Class: Demospongiae
- Order: Poecilosclerida
- Family: Chondropsidae
- Genus: Chondropsis; Carter, 1886

Synonyms
- Burtonispongia Laubenfels, 1936; Collosclerophora Dendy, 1917; Sigmatella Lendenfeld, 1888

= Chondropsis (sponge) =

Genus of sponges

Chondropsis is a genus of sponges belonging to the family Chondropsidae.

The species of this genus are found in Southern Africa, Malesia, Australia.

Species:

- Chondropsis arenacea (Dendy, 1917)
- Chondropsis arenifera Carter, 1886
- Chondropsis australis (Lendenfeld, 1888)
- Chondropsis ceratosus Kirkpatrick, 1900
- Chondropsis chaliniformis
- Chondropsis columnifera Dendy, 1895
- Chondropsis confoederata (Lamarck, 1814)
- Chondropsis isimangaliso Samaai, Pillay & Janson, 2019
- Chondropsis kirkii (Bowerbank, 1841)
- Chondropsis lamella (Lendenfeld, 1888)
- Chondropsis macropsamma (Lendenfeld, 1888)
- Chondropsis subtilis Calcinai, Bavestrello, Bertolino, Pica & C.Wagner
- Chondropsis topsenti Dendy, 1895
- Chondropsis wilsoni Dendy, 1895
