= Desmacididae =

Scientific classification
- Domain: Eukaryota
- Kingdom: Animalia
- Phylum: Porifera
- Class: Demospongiae
- Order: Poecilosclerida
- Family: Desmacididae

Family of sponges

Desmacididae is a family of sponges belonging to the order Poecilosclerida.

Genera:

- Desmacidon Bowerbank, 1861
- Desmapsamma Burton, 1934
