= Phellodermidae =

Scientific classification
- Kingdom: Animalia
- Phylum: Porifera
- Class: Demospongiae
- Order: Poecilosclerida
- Genus: Phellodermidae van Soest & Hajdu, 2002

Family of sponges

Phellodermidae is a family of sponges belonging to the order Poecilosclerida, first described by Rob van Soest and Eduardo Hajdu in 2002.

Genera:

- Echinostylinos Topsent, 1927
- Phelloderma Ridley & Dendy, 1886
