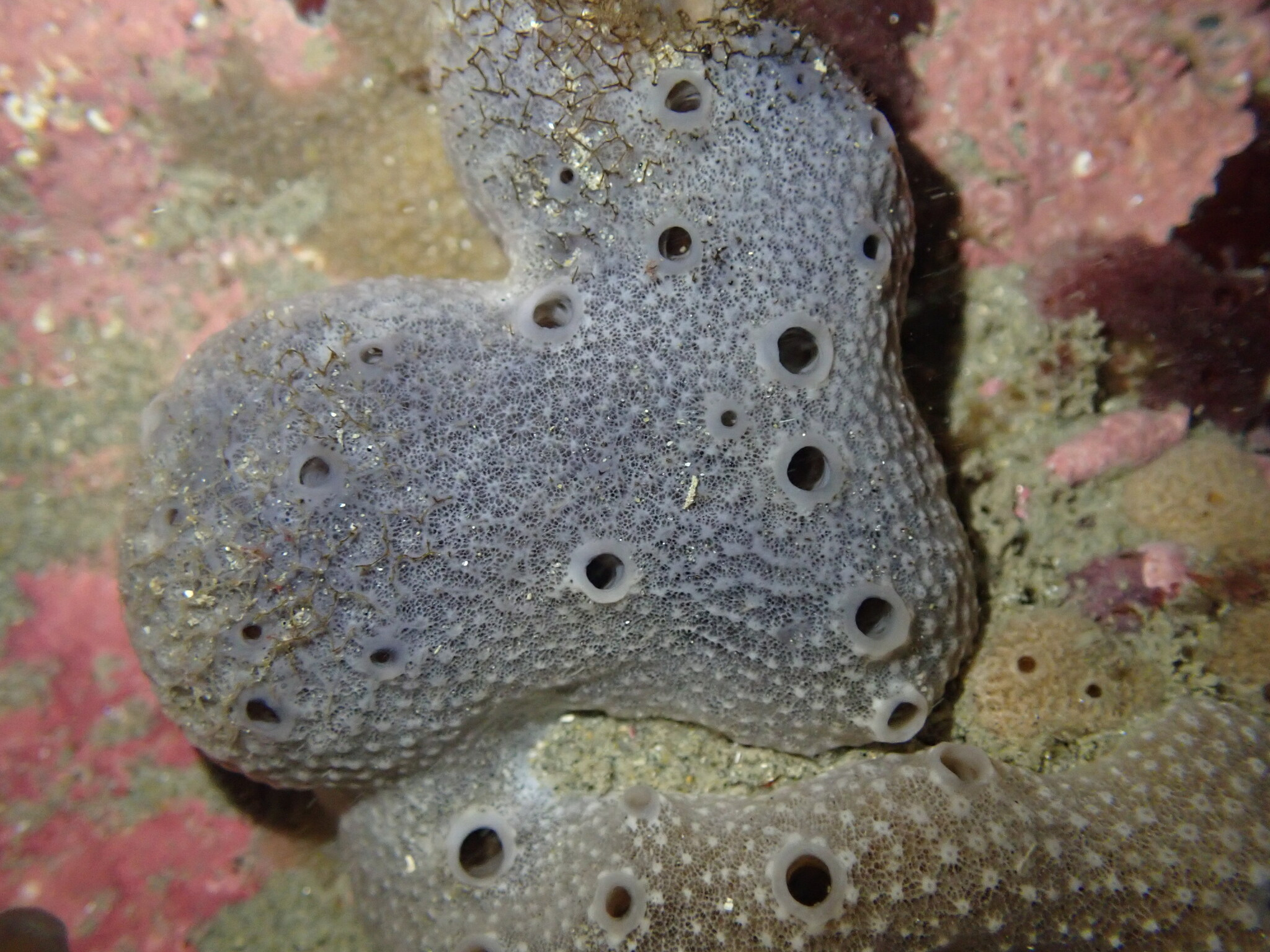
- Strongylacidon conulosum

Scientific classification
- Kingdom: Animalia
- Phylum: Porifera
- Class: Demospongiae
- Order: Poecilosclerida
- Family: Chondropsidae; Carter, 1886

Synonyms
- List: Chondropsiidae; Collosclerophoreae Dendy, 1922; Collosclerophoridae Dendy, 1922; Phoriospongidae; Phoriospongiidae; Phoriospongiinae Lendenfeld, 1889; Psammascidae Laubenfels, 1936

= Chondropsidae =

Family of sponges

Chondropsidae is a family of sponges belonging to the order Poecilosclerida.

Genera:

- Batzella Topsent, 1893
- Chondropsis Carter, 1886
- Phoriospongia Marshall, 1880
- Psammoclema Marshall, 1880
- Strongylacidon Lendenfeld, 1897
