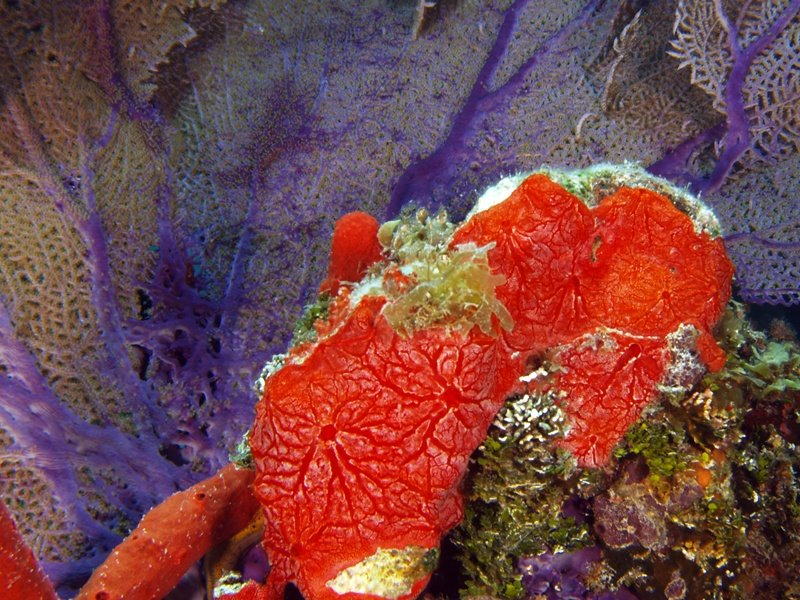

Scientific classification
- Kingdom: Animalia
- Phylum: Porifera
- Class: Demospongiae
- Order: Poecilosclerida
- Family: Crambeidae
- Genus: Monanchora
- Species: M. arbuscula

Binomial name
- Monanchora arbuscula Duchassaing & Michelotti, 1864

Synonyms
- Monanchora barbadensis Hetchel, 1969; M. unguifera de Laubenfels, 1953; Pandaros arbusculum Duchassaing & Michelotti, 1864

= Monanchora arbuscula =

Species of marine demosponge

Monanchora arbuscula is a species of marine demosponge in the family Crambeidae.

== Description ==
Monanchora arbuscula is an encrusting or bushy demosponge which is dark red or bright scarlet on its inside and its surface. It forms either a low or tall mass, and individual organisms can have a bush, round, or fan shape. It has scattered openings (oscula) which are surrounded by a white collar in a star-like pattern. These collars are formed from exhalant canals which can sometimes not be seen. There are a few oscula which are on the ends of short tube-shaped lobes, and there are many knobs (lamellae) along the surface.

Often, specimens will have different combinations of kinds of spicules which attach them to their medium. When certain specimens lack one or more of these types of spicule, identifying them becomes problematic. For example, while encrusting specimens have fine filaments of roughly tylostyle spicules, bushy specimens have a central mesh of spicules which are surrounded by spongin.

When taken out of the water, the exhalant canals collapse, and their red-orange interior color disappears. When handled, it will stain human skin because of the soft consistency of its tissue. The interior skeleton, however, is very tough.

== Taxonomy ==
At the time of its description, the basionym Pandaros arbusculum Duchassaing & Michelotti, 1864 was first used to name the species. It has also been described under the erroneous synonyms Monanchora barbadensis Hechtel, 1969 and M. unguifera de Laubenfels, 1953.

== Distribution and habitat ==
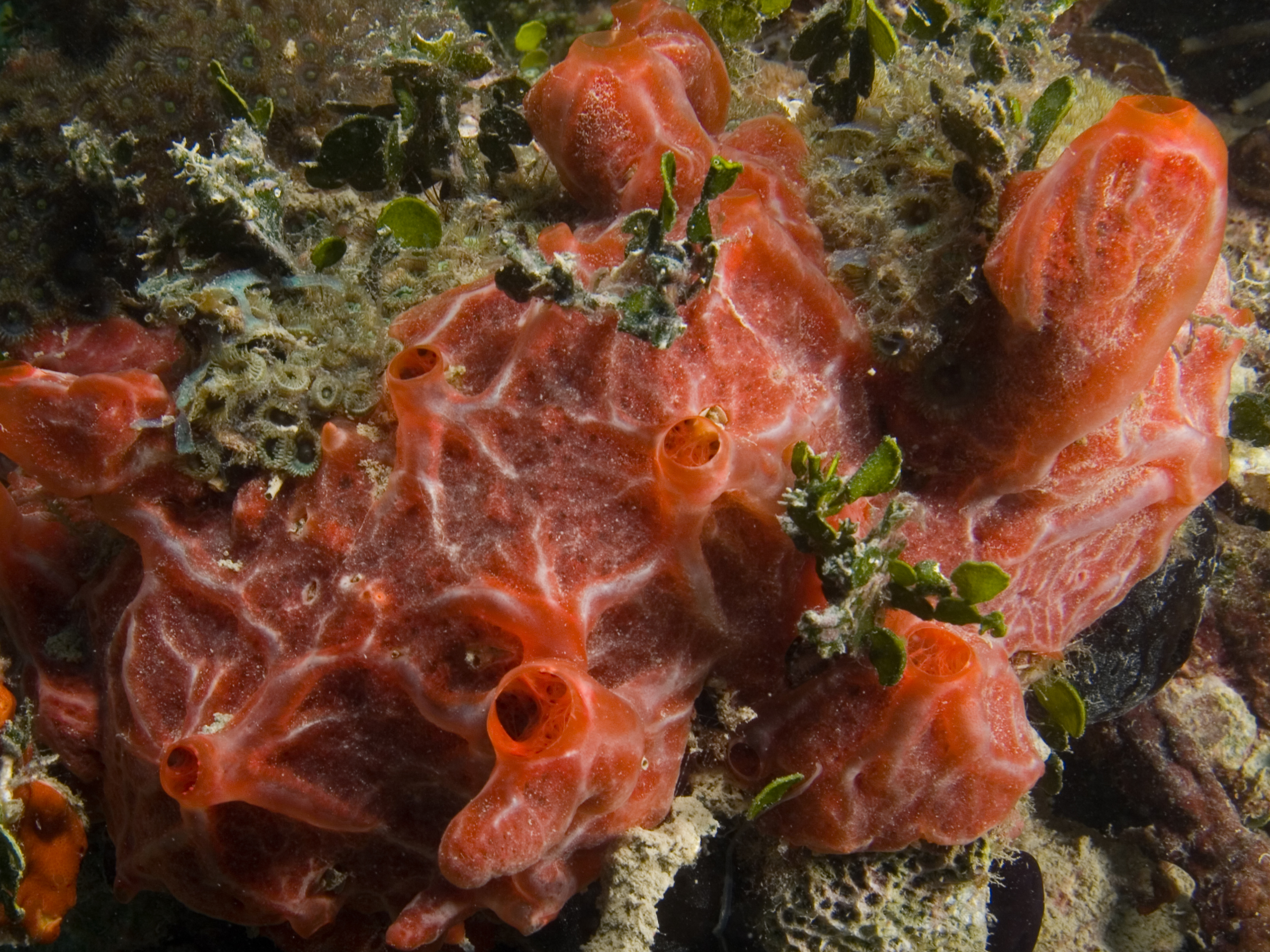
M. arbuscula can grow on a variety of substrates in reef habitats

Monanchora arbuscula is found in brackish waters and is associated with reefs. It is found at depths of 2–58 m (6.6–190.3 ft) in tropical environments of the Western Atlantic. It may encrust different species in shallow reefs, such as dead corals, mollusc shells, and gorgonian axes. It can also be found on hard substrate on the bottom, or in mangrove ponds.

== Behavior ==
As a species of demosponge, Monanchora arbuscula is hermaphroditic. It begins its life cycle as a zygote, which develops into a free-swimming larva. The larva lands on substrate and begins growing into a juvenile sponge there.
