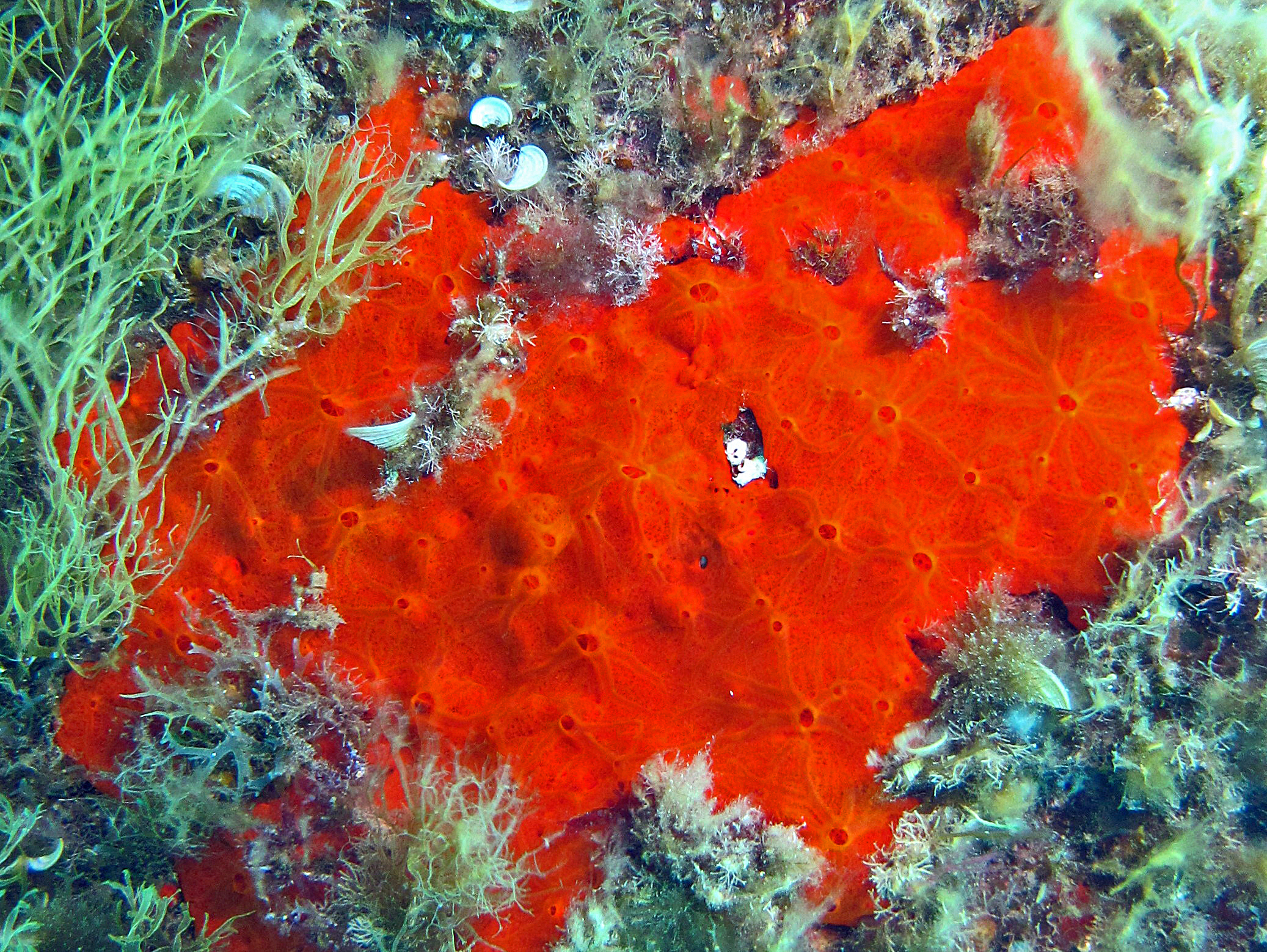
- Crambe crambe

Scientific classification
- Domain: Eukaryota
- Kingdom: Animalia
- Phylum: Porifera
- Class: Demospongiae
- Order: Poecilosclerida
- Family: Crambeidae
- Genus: Crambe; Vosmaer, 1880

Synonyms
- Plicatella Schmidt, 1870; Tetranthella Lendenfeld, 1894

= Crambe (sponge) =

Genus of sponges

Crambe is a genus of demosponges belonging to the family Crambeidae.

== Species ==
- Crambe acuata (Lévi, 1958)
- Crambe amarilla Esteves, Lôbo-Hajdu & Hajdu, 2007
- Crambe chilensis Esteves, Lôbo-Hajdu & Hajdu, 2007
- Crambe crambe (Schmidt, 1862)
- Crambe erecta Pulitzer-Finali, 1993
- Crambe maldonadoi Esteves, Lôbo-Hajdu & Hajdu, 2007
- Crambe panamensis Maldonado, Carmona, van Soest & Pomponi, 2001
- Crambe tailliezi Vacelet & Boury-Esnault, 1982
- Crambe tuberosa Maldonado & Benito, 1991
