= Rhizoid =

Protuberances that extend from the lower epidermal cells of bryophytes and algae

Rhizoids are protuberances that extend from the lower epidermal cells of bryophytes and algae. They are similar in structure and function to the root hairs of vascular land plants. Similar structures are formed by some fungi and sponges. Rhizoids may be unicellular or multicellular.

== Evolutionary development ==
Plants originated in aquatic environments and gradually migrated to land during their long course of evolution. In water or near it, plants could absorb water from their surroundings, with no need for any special absorbing organ or tissue. Additionally, in the primitive states of plant development, tissue differentiation and division of labor were minimal, thus specialized water-absorbing tissue was not required. The development of specialized tissues to absorb water efficiently and anchor the plant body to the ground enabled the spread of plants onto land.

== Description ==
Rhizoids absorb water mainly by capillary action in which water moves up between threads of rhizoids; this is in contrast to roots in which water moves up through a single root. However, some species of bryophytes do have the ability to take up water inside their rhizoids.

=== Land plants ===
In land plants, rhizoids are trichomes that anchor the plant to the ground. In the liverworts, they are absent or unicellular, but they are multicellular in mosses. In vascular plants, they are often called root hairs and may be unicellular or multicellular.

=== Algae ===
In certain algae, there is an extensive rhizoidal system that allows the alga to anchor itself to a sandy substrate from which it can absorb nutrients. Microscopic free-floating species, however, do not have rhizoids at all.

=== Fungi ===
In fungi, rhizoids are small branching hyphae that grow downwards from the stolons and anchor the fungus to the substrate, where they release digestive enzymes and absorb digested organic material.

=== Sponges ===
Rhizoid-like structures are also present in some species of sponge, where they are used to anchor the sponge into the ground. One notable example of this structure is in the lyre sponge (Chondrocladia lyra), which feeds carnivorously via "branches" that grow vertically off of stolons located on top of the rhizoid.

== See also ==
- Rhizine, the equivalent structure in lichens
