= Guitarridae =

Scientific classification
- Domain: Eukaryota
- Kingdom: Animalia
- Phylum: Porifera
- Class: Demospongiae
- Order: Poecilosclerida
- Family: Guitarridae

Family of sponges

Guitarridae is a family of sponges belonging to the order Poecilosclerida.

Genera:

- Coelodischela Vacelet, Vasseur & Lévi, 1976
- Guitarra Carter, 1874
- Tetrapocillon Brøndsted, 1924
