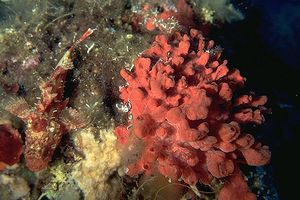
- Crambe crambe

Scientific classification
- Kingdom: Animalia
- Phylum: Porifera
- Class: Demospongiae
- Order: Poecilosclerida
- Family: Crambeidae; Lévi, 1963

Genera
- See text

= Crambeidae =

Family of sponges

Crambeidae is a family of marine demosponges.

Identification of members of this family of sponges is based on microscopic examination of the spicules in their skeleton. The megascleres consist of peripheral thinner subtylostyles and thicker choanosomal styles while the microscleres are exclusively anchorate chelae.

== Genera ==
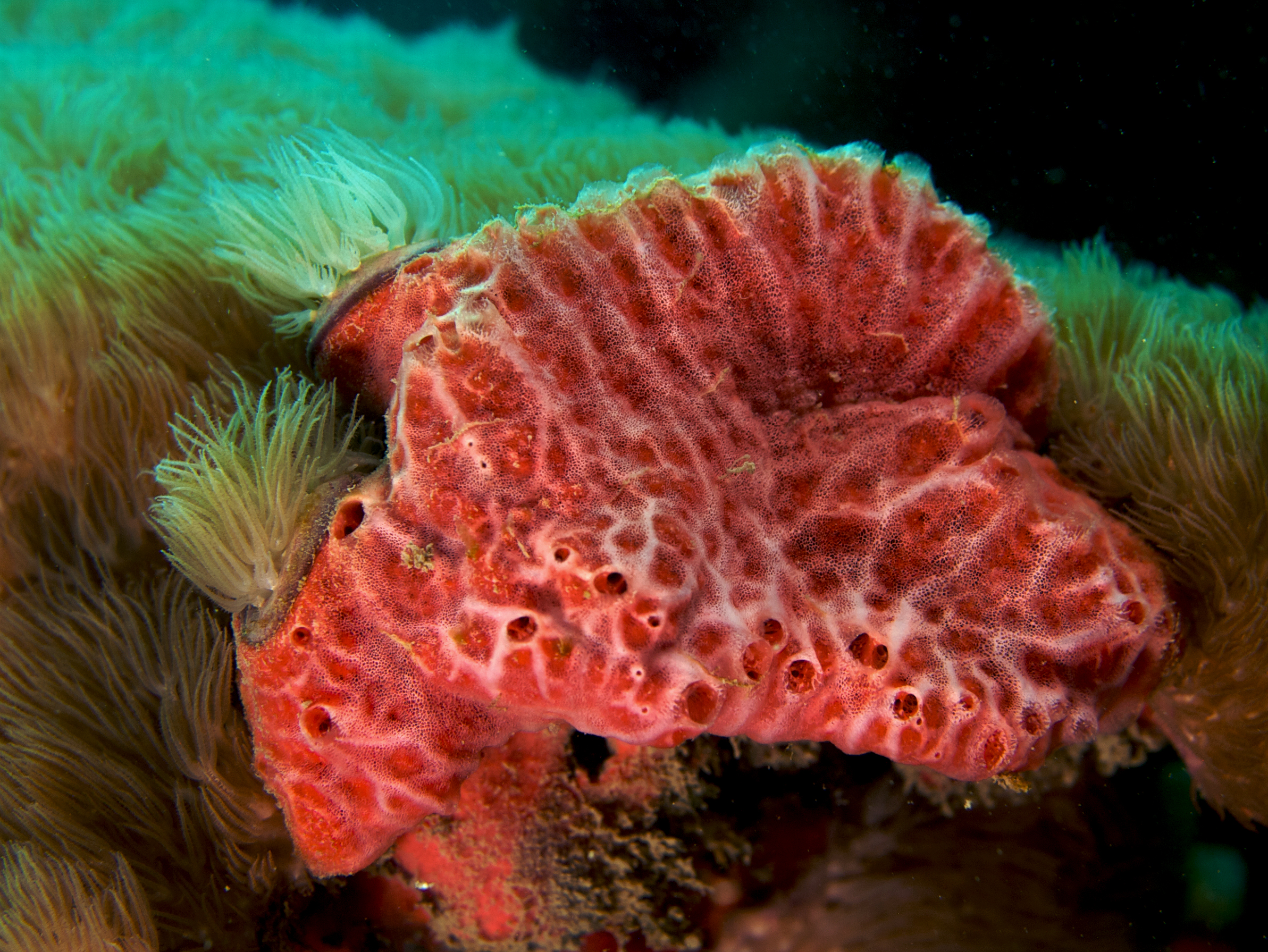
Monanchora arbuscula

- Crambe Vosmaer, 1880
- Discorhabdella Dendy, 1924
- Lithochela Burton, 1929
- Monanchora Carter, 1883
