= Dendoricellidae =

Scientific classification
- Domain: Eukaryota
- Kingdom: Animalia
- Phylum: Porifera
- Class: Demospongiae
- Order: Poecilosclerida
- Suborder: Myxillina
- Family: Dendoricellidae

Family of sponges

Dendoricellidae is a family of sponges belonging to the order Poecilosclerida.

Genera:

- Dendoricella Lundbeck, 1905
- Fibulia Carter, 1886
- Pyloderma Kirkpatrick, 1907
