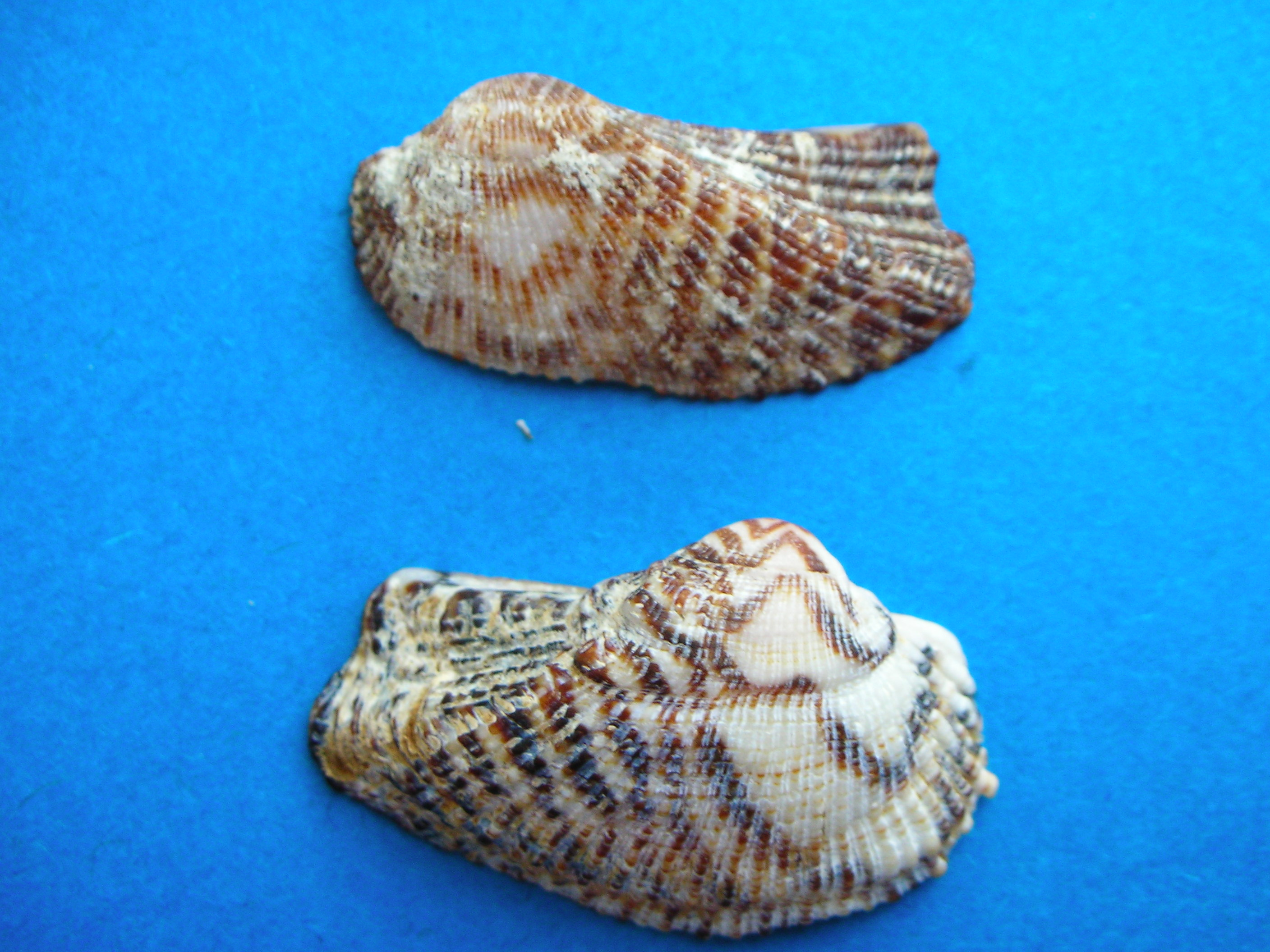

Scientific classification
- Kingdom: Animalia
- Phylum: Mollusca
- Class: Bivalvia
- Order: Arcida
- Family: Arcidae
- Genus: Arca
- Species: A. noae

Binomial name
- Arca noae Linnaeus, 1758

= Arca noae =

Species of bivalve

Arca noae or the Noah's Ark shell is a species of bivalve mollusc in the family Arcidae. It is found in the Mediterranean Sea from low tide mark to a depth of 60 metres (200 ft).

== Description ==
The shell of Arca noae grows to about 10 cm (4 in) in length. It is shortened at the anterior end and elongated posteriorly. It is irregularly striped in brown and white and has finely sculptured ribs running from the umbones to the margin. The hinge is long and straight and the shell is attached strongly to the substrate by byssal threads. There are pallial eyes on the edges of the mantle, especially at the posterior end.

Right and left valve of the same specimen:

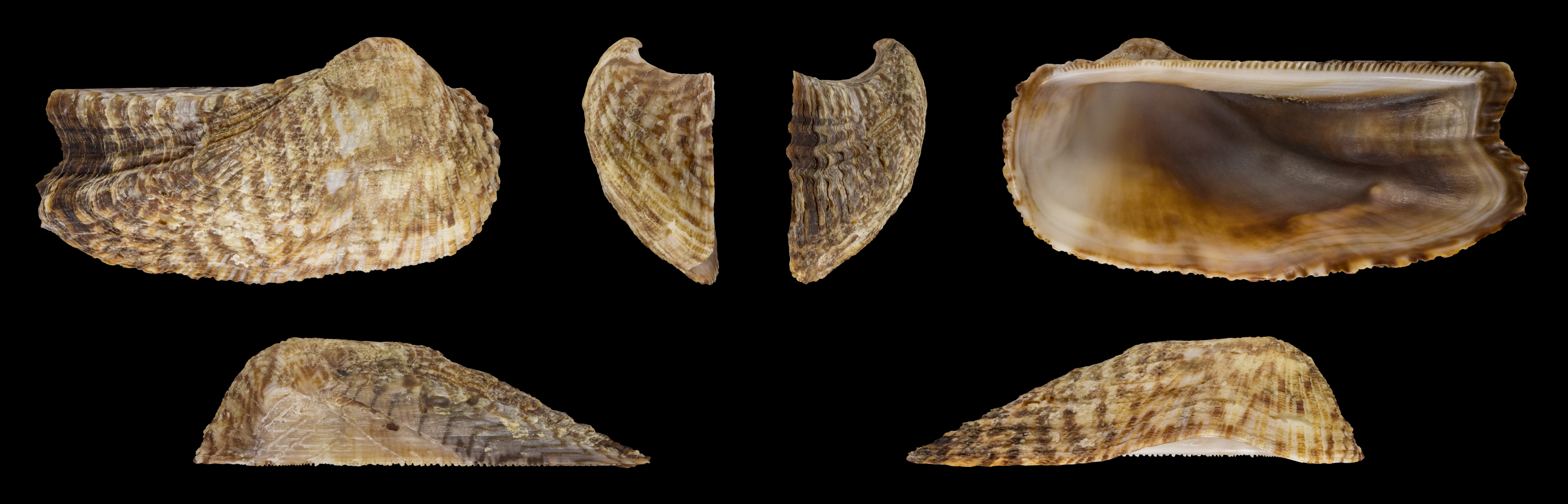
Right valve

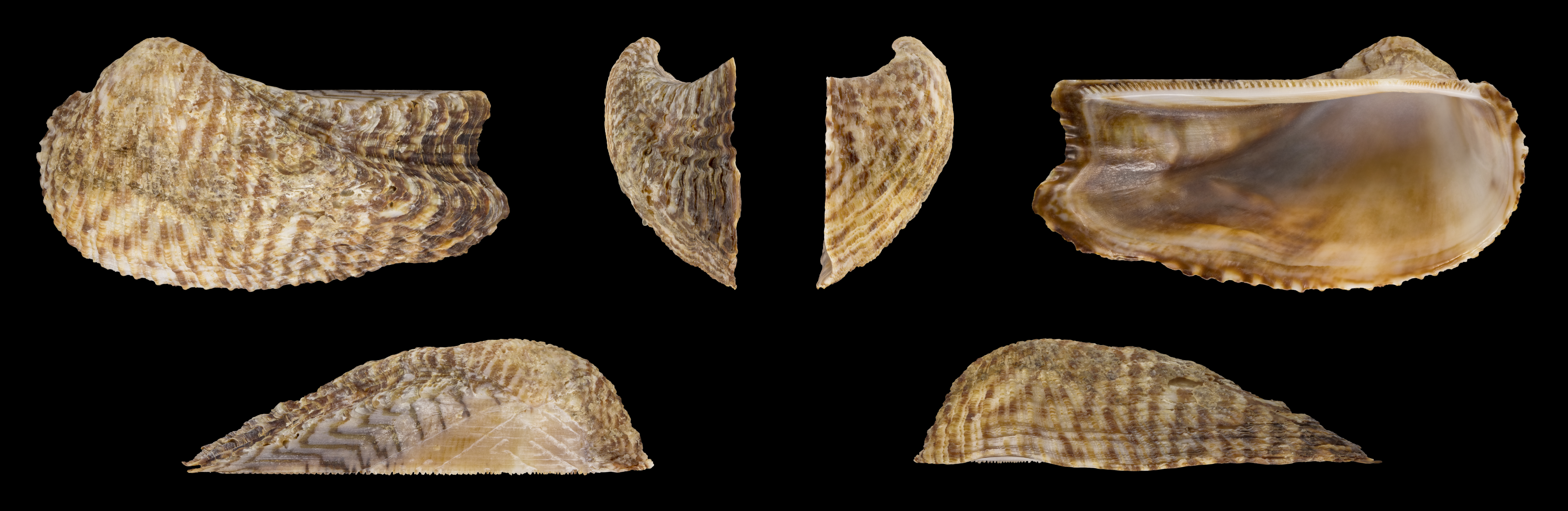
Left valve

var. abbreviata

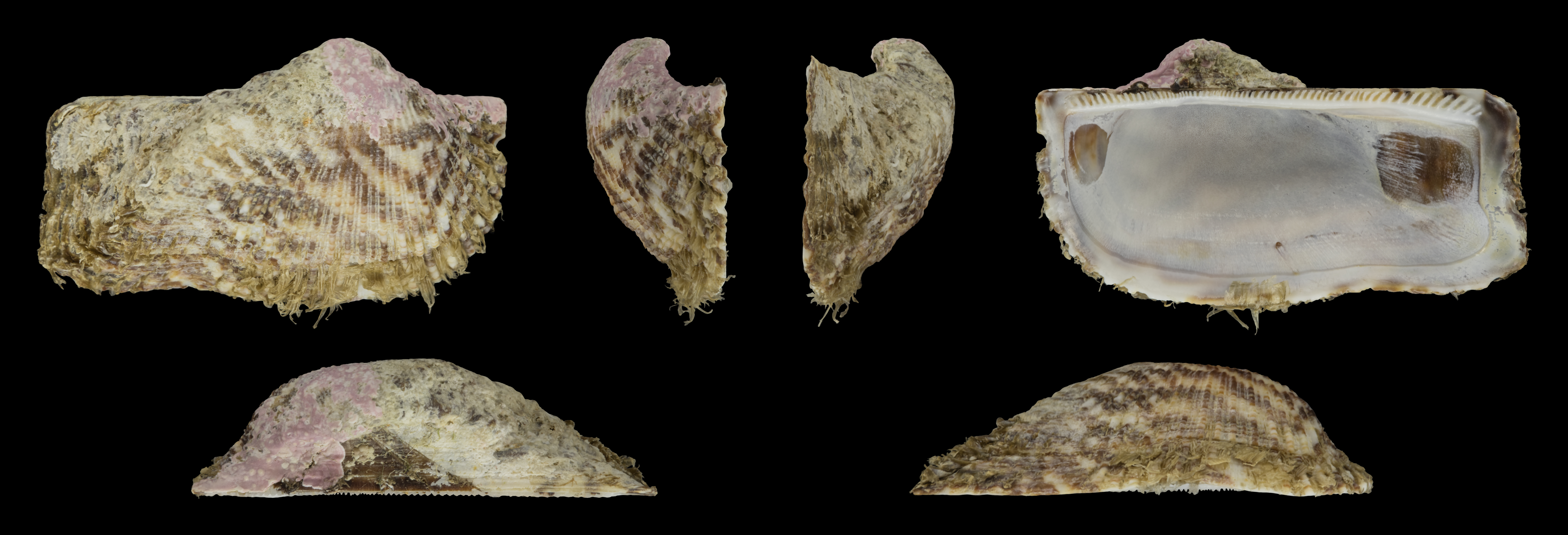
Right valve

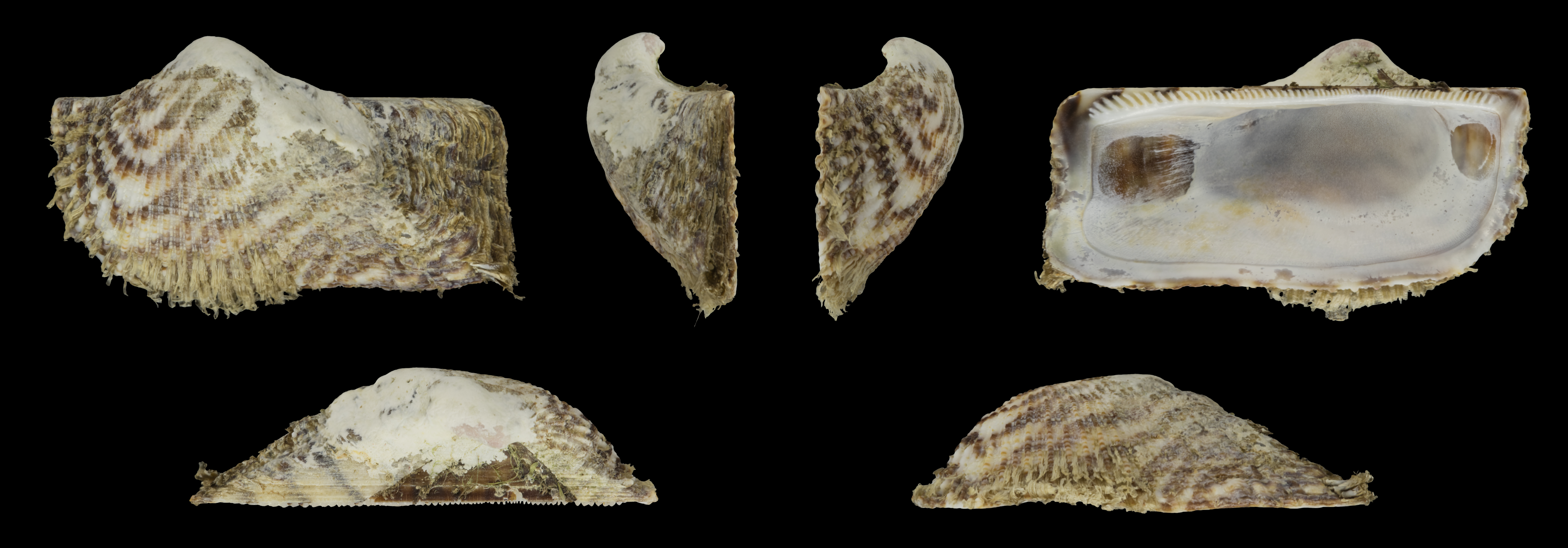
Left valve

== Distribution ==
Arca noae is found in the Mediterranean Sea. It was once common in the Adriatic, but in 1949/50 there was a sudden unexplained, catastrophic decline in numbers. Since then, populations have been creeping back upwards, and in 2002, densities of up to 13 individuals per square metre (11 square feet) were recorded. However, due to a lack of records, it is unclear whether the population had returned to its previous size.

== Biology ==
In the lower part of the intertidal zone in the Adriatic, Arca noae often grows in association with Modiolus barbatus. The shells are often heavily encrusted with epibionts. Water is drawn into the shell mainly at the posterior end. Plankton and fine organic particles are filtered out as the water passes over the gills and inedible particles are rejected at the same time.

== Uses ==
Arca noae is fished commercially in the Adriatic Sea, either by divers gathering individual shells by hand or from boats using specially adapted rakes which are pulled along the seabed. The shellfish are then sold in local markets.
