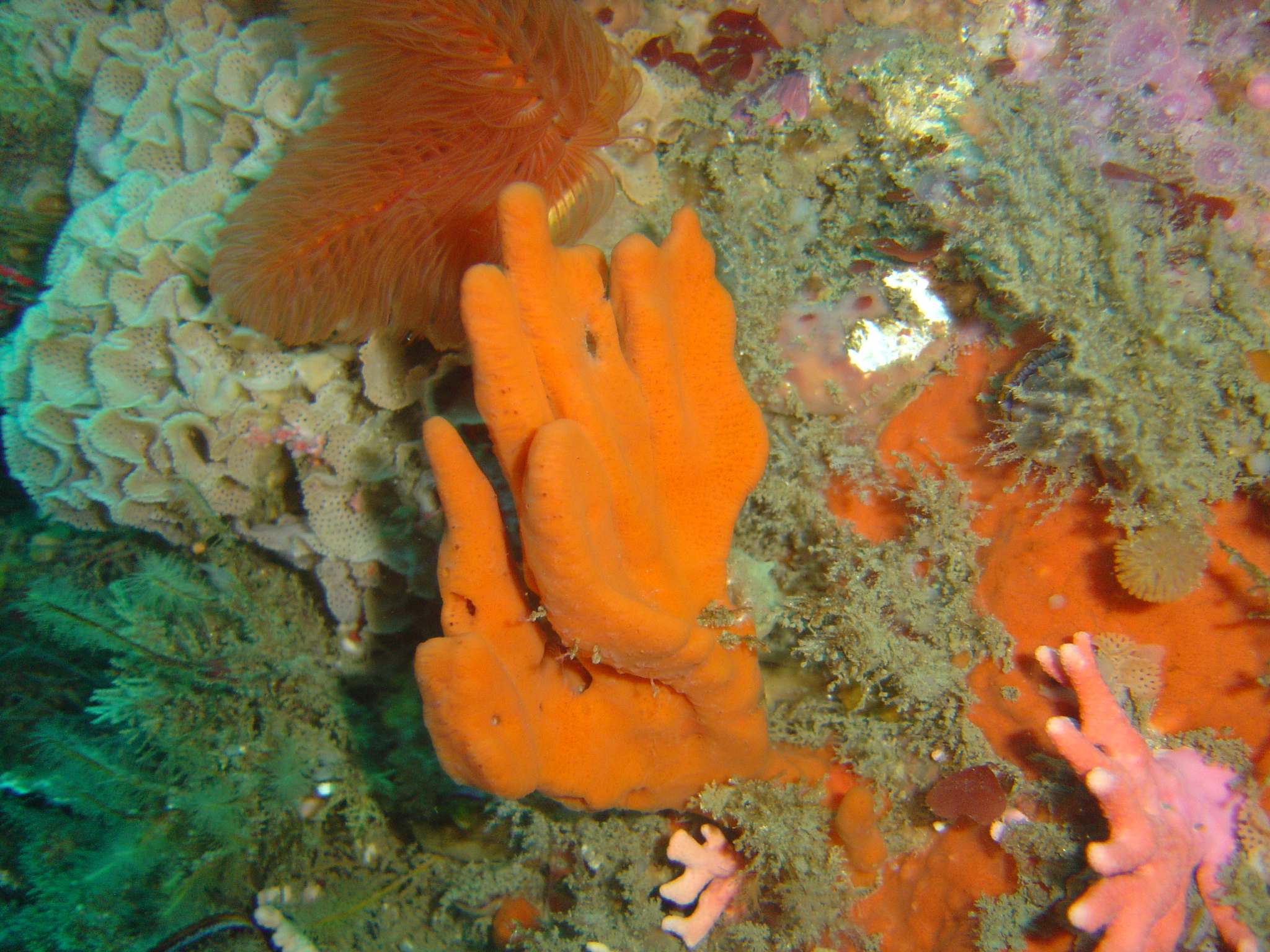

Scientific classification
- Kingdom: Animalia
- Phylum: Porifera
- Class: Demospongiae
- Order: Poecilosclerida
- Family: Isodictyidae; Dendy, 1924

Genera
- see text

= Isodictyidae =

Family of sponges

Isodictyidae is a family of marine demosponges.

== Genera ==
Genera in the family include:

- Coelocarteria Burton, 1934
- Isodictya Bowerbank, 1864
