= Antarctic Benthic Deep-Sea Biodiversity Project =

International project to investigate deep-water biology of the Scotia and Weddell seas

The Antarctic Benthic Deep-Sea Biodiversity Project (ANDEEP) is an international project to investigate deep-water biology of the Scotia and Weddell seas. Benthic refers to "bottom-dwelling" organisms that are known to exhibit unusual characteristics not normally seen in shallow-dwelling creatures. ANDEEP has already made many notable discoveries, such as animals with gigantism and extraordinary longevity.
