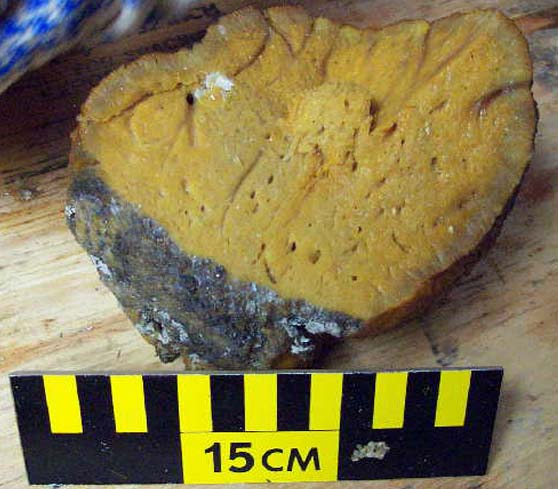
- Tedaria ignis

Scientific classification
- Domain: Eukaryota
- Kingdom: Animalia
- Phylum: Porifera
- Class: Demospongiae
- Order: Poecilosclerida
- Family: Tedaniidae

= Tedaniidae =

Family of sponges

Tedaniidae is a family of sponges belonging to the order Poecilosclerida.

Genera:

- Hemitedania Hallmann, 1914
- Strongylamma Hallmann, 1917
- Tedania Gray, 1867
- Trachytedania Ridley, 1881
