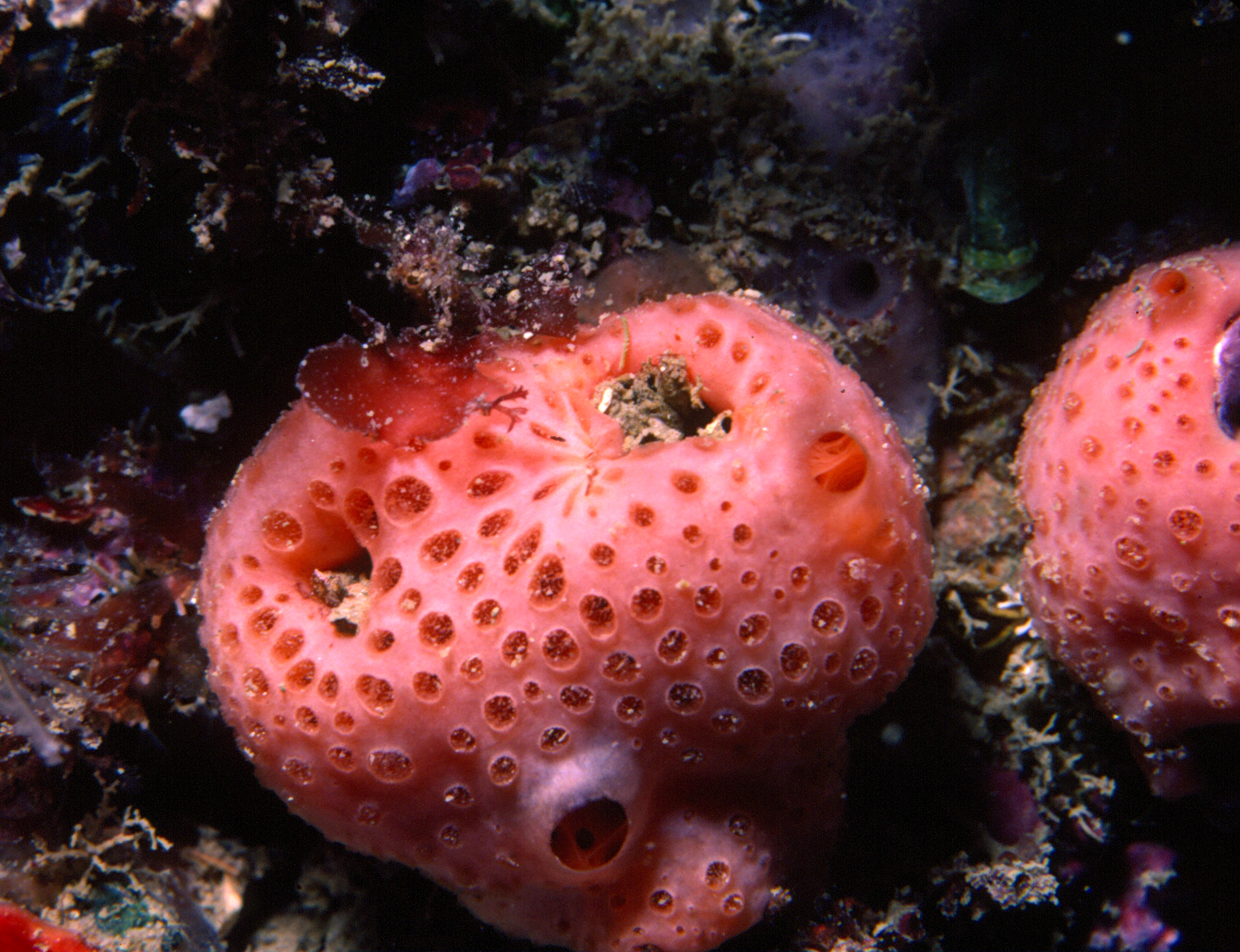
- Hemimycale columella (Hymedesmiidae)

Scientific classification
- Kingdom: Animalia
- Phylum: Porifera
- Class: Demospongiae
- Order: Poecilosclerida; Topsent, 1928

Families
- See text

= Poecilosclerida =

Order of sponges

Poecilosclerida is an order of the demosponge class. It is the most speciose demosponge order with over 2200 species (World Porifera Database). It contains about 25 recognised families. They are characterised by having chelae microscleres, that is, the minute spicules scattered through the tissues, usually in the 10-60 μm range, have a shovel-like structure on the end.

Most of the families are viviparous with parenchymella larvae that are uniformly ciliated.

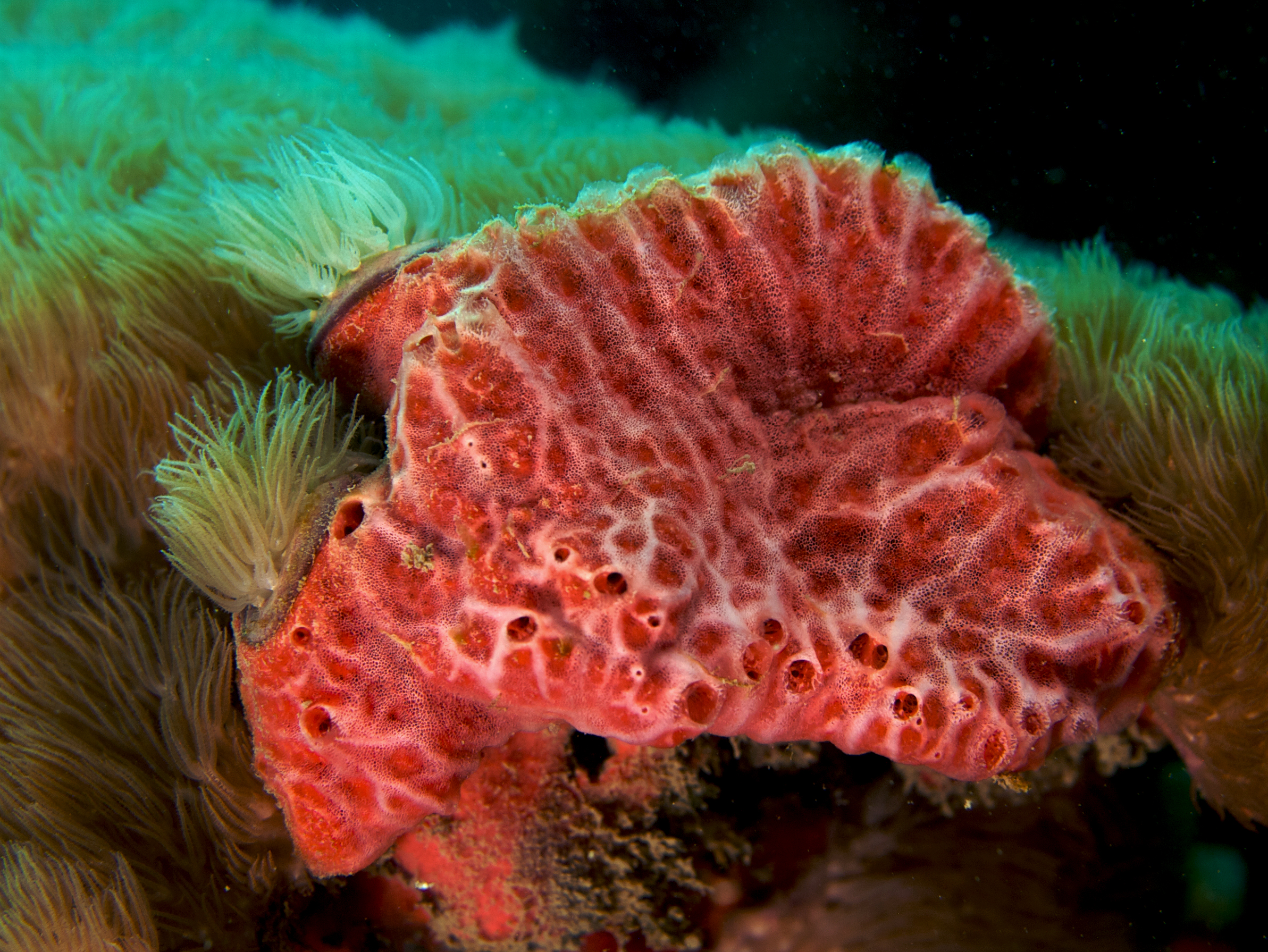
Monanchora arbuscula (Crambeidae)

== Families ==
As of 2018, the following families are recognized:

- Family Acarnidae
- Family Chondropsidae
- Family Cladorhizidae
- Family Coelosphaeridae
- Family Crambeidae
- Family Crellidae
- Family Dendoricellidae
- Family Desmacididae
- Family Esperiopsidae
- Family Guitarridae
- Family Hymedesmiidae
- Family Iotrochotidae
- Family Isodictyidae
- Family Latrunculiidae
- Family Microcionidae
- Family Mycalidae
- Family Myxillidae
- Family Phellodermidae
- Family Podospongiidae
- Family Tedaniidae
