= Abyssocladia falkor =

Scientific classification
- Kingdom: Animalia
- Phylum: Porifera
- Class: Demospongiae
- Order: Poecilosclerida
- Family: Cladorhizidae
- Genus: Abyssocladia
- Species: A. falkor

Binomial name
- Abyssocladia falkor Ekins & Hopper, 2023

Species of sponge

Abyssocladia falkor is a deep-sea species of carnivorous sponges from the genus Abyssocladia. It was discovered in August 2020 on the research vessel RV Falkor and later described in 2023 by Ekins & Hopper. A. falkor is found at depths of around 1800 m at the Great Barrier Reef in Australia. Like other Cladorhizids, it lacks the typical filter-feeding system of other sponges. Instead, it relies on a carnivorous feeding strategy, characterized by abyssochelae and sigmancistras, specialized hook-like spicules used to catch and immobilize prey. The internal composition of other specialized spiculas enables stability and flexibility in its otherwise delicate flower-like body form.

== Etymology ==
The species was named falkor as epitheton in honor of the Schmidt Ocean Institute research vessel RV Falkor that enabled the discovery.

== Biology ==
=== The genus Abyssocladia ===
Along with 38 other species of carnivorous sponges, Abyssocladia falkor belongs to the genus Abyssocladia and further the family Cladorhizidae. Most sponges have an aquiferous system and filter water to get their food. Carnivorous sponges have undergone exaptation, where the function of some spicules used for support and structure have evolved to function as prey-catching structures instead, such as abyssochelae and microscleres.

The species in the genus Abyssocladia are characterized by their unique prey-catching structure called abyssochelae. Sizes in this group can vary from a few millimeters to several centimeters tall and just a few millimeters wide. With soft external tissues and thin skeleton, sponges belonging to Abyssocladia have a very fragile appearance but strong spicules enable stability to their upright structure.

Abyssocladia sponges have a worldwide distribution, most of them in the deep sea around 3000 m, but some species in the group as shallow as 200-1000 m down. Resources are scarce at these depths, and their unusual process of feeding most likely evolved to get more nutrients in one meal than filter feeding the deep-sea water.

=== Morphology ===
The holotype (main sample used for describing the species) is a pedunculate species with a short stem supporting a circular, disc-shaped body. The disc has a diameter of 7.8 mm and thickness of 1.3 mm. From the disc margin, slender filaments radiate outward in a single plane, reaching 2.3 mm long and 0.1 mm wide.

The paratype of Abyssocladia falkor, extra specimens apart from the holotype used to show variation, has a body of 6.7 mm diameter and 1.6 mm width. It shows the full stem and root system (which were lost from the holotype during collection), extending to 40 mm in length, and filaments reaching 4.0 mm. The colour of the species is cream when alive, but also on deck and preserved in ethanol.

Like other carnivorous sponges, Abyssocladia falkor has both an internal (endosomal) and external (ectosomal) skeleton of spicules.

==== Endosomal skeleton ====
The endosomal skeleton is made of various specialized spicules, each with its own structure and function. The axis of the stem consists of longitudinal tracts of mycalostyles; long, thin and slightly curved structural spicule with one rounded base, and sinuous styles; slightly bent or s-shaped spicules with one pointy end and one rounded end. Sinuous styles have a very important function as support beams inside the sponge's body as they interlock with other spicules and enable a strong but flexible structure. Furthermore, they allow soft, delicate sponge tissues to keep shape without being rigid or brittle. Without this type of spicule, the straight, delicate and flower-like structure would be too stiff and prone to snapping in deep-sea currents.

Filaments, consisting solely of subtylostyles; long and straight spicules with one pointy end and one knob-like end, radiate from the disc-shaped body. Within the body, style spicules are scattered and overlap each other, forming a criss-cross network, which helps fill space and gives internal support. The roots of Abyssocladia falkor include large mycalostyles, styles, sinuous styles, occasional subtylostyles and rarely strongyles.

==== Ectosomal skeleton ====
The ectosomal skeleton on the outer layer of the sponge creates a protective surface. It is made of tiny spicules of sigmancistras and abyssochelae. The sponge body and stem are layered with the mainly spherical microstrongyles, but also include the abyssochelae. Immediately under the outer layer are the sinuous styles. The ectosomal skeleton of the roots is a thin membrane with occasional abyssochelae, sigmas and sigmancistras. Both abyssochelae and sigmancistras are part of Abyssocladia falkor's prey-capturing coat on the sponge's filaments, working together to catch, hold, and immobilise small prey-crustaceans.

Megascleres: Include mycalostyles which are long and generally straight, sometimes with a slight curve, and have a rounded point. Styles are usually straight, sometimes with a slight curve, thickest in the centre with a blunt point, sometimes with a very faint style swelling. They are separated from the mycalostyles often by their location in the body but also could be a continuum of a single category of megasclere. The sinuous styles occur around the mycalostyles that form the stem, just beneath the dermal microstrongyles. Subtylostyles are long and straight, sharply pointed, and form the filaments. Rare strongyles also appear in the roots.

Microscleres: Consist of abyssochelae isochelae with curved shaft, and contacting opposing alae. On the exterior surfaces there are usually small sigmas and small sigmancistras. There are also long thin sigmas that are rare and only occur on the paratype body so may not be native. The predominately spherical to subspherical shaped microstrongyles are microspined. However they could also be dumbbell-shaped and rarely dildo- shaped. The microstrongyles have either a rounded (tylomicrostrongyle) or a sharp end (tylomicrostyles).

==== Feeding structure ====
Most species in Abyssocladia, A. falkor included, are characterized by the presence of abyssochelae. Abyssochelae (abyss = deep-sea, chela = claw) have through evolution transformed from chelea to specialized hook-like spicules. They are part of the sponge's "hunting gear" and used to trap and immobilize prey in the surrounding water. Not all carnivorous sponges have abyssochelae, but most species in Abyssocladia do.

Another type of specialized spicule found in A. falkor are sigmancistras, which are sigma-shaped (ς), microscopic barbed hooks. Both abyssochelae and sigmancistras are part of A. falkor's prey-capturing coat on the sponge's filaments, working together to catch, hold, and immobilise small prey-crustaceans.

A. falkor uses its hook shaped spicules to hold small crustaceans in place while its cells engulf them.

=== Distribution and habitat ===
Abyssocladia falkor is known only from the Coral Sea off Queensland, Australia. It occurs within the bathyal zone. The recorded depth of the collected holotype during the research expedition FK200802 was 1822 m.

The bathyal zone is characterized by cold, relatively stable temperatures, darkness due to the absence of sunlight, and high hydrostatic pressure. Food availability is low and mainly comes from sinking organic material produced in surface waters. The seafloor is typically made up of soft sediments or rocky areas, depending on the local terrain. Organisms living here are generally slow-growing and adapted to high pressure.

=== Reproduction ===
In general, little is known about the spermatogenesis and sexual reproduction of carnivorous sponges due to their scarceness and the limited accessibility to deep sea habitats. Within the genus Abyssocladia, viviparity has been described for the species A. microstrongylata: Living tissue contained embryos about 500 μm in diameter.

=== Taxonomy ===
Compared with similar species, A. falkor differs in its combination of body shape, spicule sets, and microstrongyle morphology. It can be distinguished from A. natsushimae, the closest related species, as it has a smaller, more circular body and does not contain two size classes of abyssochelae. It also differs from A. bruuni which is characterised by large abyssochelae and the absence of microstrongyles. With other species such as A. annae and A. fryerae, A. falkor shares some general similarities but differs in morphological details.

== Species discovery by research expedition FK200802 ==
During the research expedition FK200802 "Seamounts, Canyons & Reefs of the Coral Sea Cruise" at the Great Barrier Reef (Australia) in August 2020, a team of multidisciplinary scientists conducted the deepest-ever surveys of the Great Barrier Reef Marine Park and adjacent Coral Sea regions. For taking habitat samples, collecting specimens and recording high-resolution video material of the deep sea floor, the ROV SuBastian was deployed. Five undescribed species of black corals and deep sea sponges, one of them Abyssocladia falkor, were found at the deep sea floor, some at 1980m depth. Additionally, the rare fish species Rhinopias argoliba was documented for the first time in Australia. The cruise also retrieved complete specimens of the carnivorous deep sea sponges Chondrocladia zygainadentonis and Asbestopluma maxisigma using ROV sampling. During a former cruise with the RV Investigator, only incomplete specimens obtained by bottom trawl sampling could be retrieved. With complete specimens, the species description could be expanded and updated.

The research expedition was conducted by the Schmidt Ocean Institute on the research vessel RV Falkor. For this expedition, scientists from several institutes such as Geoscience Australia, James Cook University, University of Sydney, Japan Agency for Marine-Earth Science and Technology (JAMSTEC), Queensland Museum Network, and Queensland University of Technology collaborated. Through live-streaming of the video material filmed during the ROV dives on YouTube, the broader public was able to interact with the scientists.
