= USS Baron =

Cannon-class destroyer escort

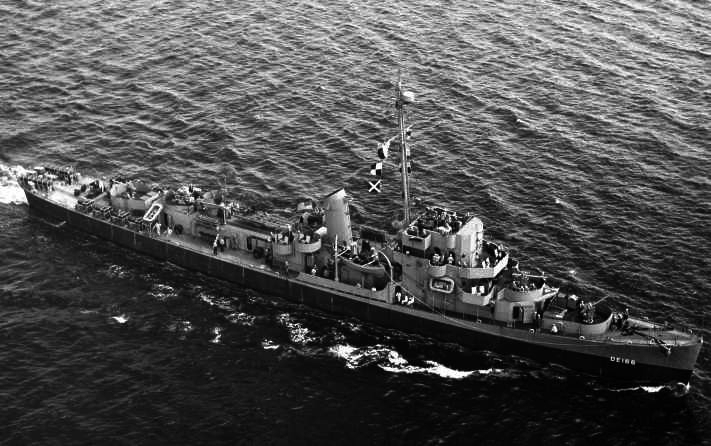

History

United States
- Name: USS Baron
- Namesake: Richard S. Baron
- Builder: Federal Shipbuilding and Drydock Company, Newark, New Jersey
- Laid down: 30 November 1942
- Launched: 9 May 1943
- Commissioned: 5 July 1943
- Decommissioned: 26 April 1946
- Stricken: 14 May 1952
- Honors and awards: 3 battle stars (World War II)
- Fate: Transferred to Uruguay, 3 May 1952

Uruguay
- Name: ROU Uruguay
- Acquired: 3 May 1952
- Stricken: 1990
- Identification: DE-1
- Fate: Sunk as Target in 1995

General characteristics
- Class & type: Cannon-class destroyer escort
- Displacement: 1,240 long tons (1,260 t) standard; 1,620 long tons (1,646 t) full
- Length: 306 ft (93 m) o/a; 300 ft (91 m) w/l
- Beam: 36 ft 10 in (11.23 m)
- Draft: 11 ft 8 in (3.56 m)
- Propulsion: 4 × GM Mod. 16-278A diesel engines with electric drive, 6,000 shp (4,474 kW), 2 screws
- Speed: 21 knots (39 km/h; 24 mph)
- Range: 10,800 nmi (20,000 km) at 12 kn (22 km/h; 14 mph)
- Complement: 15 officers and 201 enlisted
- Armament: 3 single × Mk.22 3-inch/50-caliber guns; 8 × 20 mm Mk.4 AA guns; 3 × 21 inch (533 mm) torpedo tubes; 1 × Hedgehog Mk.10 anti-submarine mortar (144 rounds); 8 × Mk.6 depth charge projectors; 2 × Mk.9 depth charge tracks

USS Baron (DE-166) was a Cannon-class destroyer escort in service with the United States Navy from 1943 to 1946. In 1952, she was transferred to Uruguay where she served as ROU Uruguay (DE-1) until 1990 when she was scuttled.

== Early career ==
=== Construction and commissioning ===
Baron was launched on 9 May 1943 by Federal Shipbuilding and Drydock Company, Newark, New Jersey; sponsored by Mrs. Anne Pl. Baron, widow of Lieutenant Commander Richard S. Baron for whom the ship was named; and, commissioned on 5 July 1943. Baron had been awarded the Navy Cross for risking his life to recover classified documents during the bombardment of Cavite, Philippines. He was killed on 15 March 1942 during the bombing of Cebu City, Philippines.

=== World War II Pacific Theatre operations ===
Baron departed New York on 8 September 1943 for the Pacific. Between October 1943 and August 1944 she escorted convoys among the island groups of the South Central Pacific Ocean. She also acted as a screen and fire-support ship during the following operations: Hollandia landings (21–24 April 1944); Truk-Satawan-Ponape raid (29 April – 1 May); Saipan invasion (20 June – 11 July); and capture of Guam (22–29 July). On 7 September 1944 she arrived at Mare Island Navy Yard for an overhaul.

Returning to the Pacific early in November 1944, Baron reported to Commander, Submarine Training, Pacific. Until the end of May 1945 she conducted training exercises with friendly submarines off Pearl Harbor and Guam. For the remainder of the war she operated in the vicinity of the Marshall Islands engaged in hunter-killer, air-sea rescue, patrol, and escort duties.

On 27 August 1945 Baron was ordered to Maloelap, Wotje, and Jaluit Atolls for the surrender of their Japanese garrisons. The surrender was completed by 6 September and Baron remained at Wotje Atoll until 18 September supervising the disarmament of the Japanese fortifications. She then steamed to San Diego, California, arriving on 29 September. Departing the next day, she proceeded to New York, where she arrived on 14 October. Baron went out of commission in reserve on 26 April 1946 at Green Cove Springs, Florida.

Baron received three battle stars for her World War II service in the Pacific.

== Use in the Uruguayan Navy ==
Baron was the first of two Cannon-class destroyers transferred to Uruguay under the Mutual Defense Assistance Program on 3 May 1952 and commissioned as ROU Uruguay (DE-1). The 20 mm Mk.4 AA guns and torpedo tubes were removed. In 1969, both destroyers participated in UNITAS X joint exercises with the U.S. and other South American navies.

== Sinking and rediscovery of the wreck ==
She was decommissioned in 1980 by the Uruguayan Navy, and sunk as a target ship in 1995 off the coast of Uruguay.

In 2025 the wreck was located and filmed by the Schmidt Ocean Institute's Uruguay Sub200 expedition. Upright and apparently in good condition it was covered in coral.

== In fiction ==
DE-166 appears in the fictional novel Thin Air as the USS Sturman.
