= Cladorhiza inversa =

Scientific classification
- Kingdom: Animalia
- Phylum: Porifera
- Class: Demospongiae
- Order: Poecilosclerida
- Family: Cladorhizidae
- Genus: Cladorhiza
- Species: C. inversa

Binomial name
- Cladorhiza inversa Ridley & Dendy, 1886

Synonyms
- Cladorrhiza inversa

Species of sponge

Cladorhiza inversa is a species of sponge in the taxonomic class Demospongiae. The body of the sponge consists of a spicule and fibers and is water absorbent.

The scientific name of this species was first published in 1886 by Ridley & Dendy.
