= RV Falkor Too =

Oceanografic research vessel to be used by the Schmidt Ocean Institute

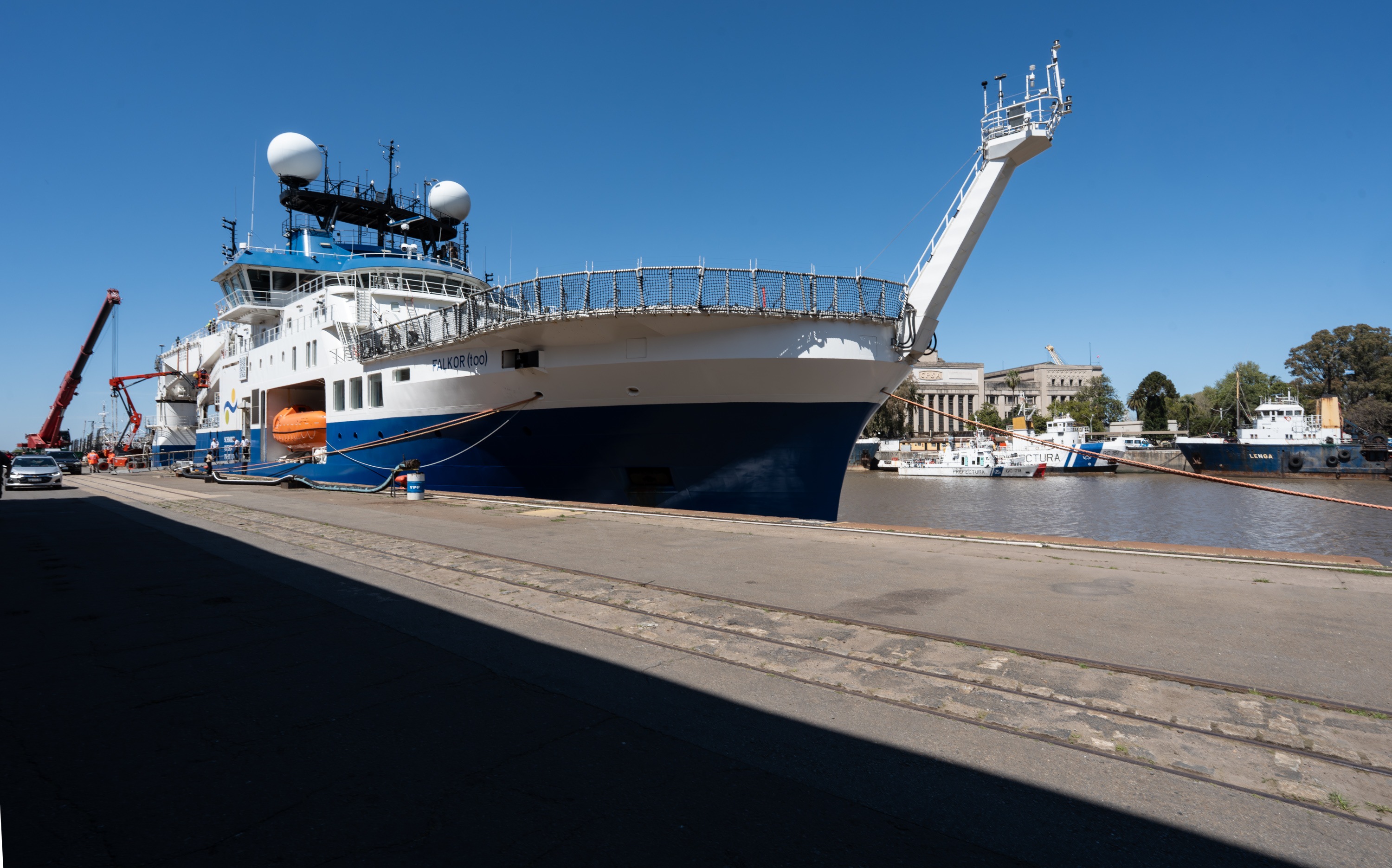
- Falkor (too) at the Port of Buenos Aires, 2025

History

Cyprus
- Name: Polar Queen
- Owner: GC Rieber Shipping
- Port of registry: Limassol
- Ordered: 2007-11-01
- Builder: C.N.P. Freire, S.A, Vigo, Spain
- Yard number: 703
- Laid down: 11 December 2008
- Launched: 1 July 2010
- In service: 2011
- Out of service: 2021

Cayman Islands
- Name: Falkor (too)
- Namesake: Falkor (luckdragon)
- Owner: V2 ORI LLC
- Operator: Schmidt Ocean Institute
- Port of registry: George Town, Cayman Islands
- Acquired: 23 March 2021
- Refit: 2021-2022
- Identification: IMO number: 9523378; MMSI number: 319210400; Callsign: ZGOJ7; DNV ID: 28798
- Status: re-launched March 2023

General characteristics
- Tonnage: 4,360 DWT
- Length: 110.16 m (361 ft 5 in) o/a; 97.8 m (320 ft 10 in) p/p
- Beam: 20.0 m (66 ft)
- Ice class: DNV ICE-C
- Installed power: Diesel-electric, 10,260 kW (13,759 hp); 6 × 1,710 kW (2,293 hp) MAN 9L21/31 diesel generators
- Propulsion: 2 × 3,800 kW (5,096 hp) Voith Schneider Propellers VSP 36R6EC/300-2; 1 × 1,350 kW (1,810 hp) Rolls-Royce TT2400 DPN CP azimuth thruster (retractable); 2 × 1,400 kW (1,877 hp) Rolls-Royce UL 2001 CP bow thrusters
- Speed: 15.85 knots (29.35 km/h; 18.24 mph) (maximum)
- Complement: 112
- Aviation facilities: Helicopter deck, max. helicopter weight 12.8 tonnes

RV Falkor (too) is an oceanographic research vessel refitted in 2021–2022 from the former multi-role offshore support vessel MS Polar Queen. The ship was purchased by the Schmidt Ocean Institute in March 2021. It replaced the RV Falkor.

== Building and Delivery ==
The Norwegian company Sea4 AS had ordered two new vessels to be built by the C.N.P. Freire, S.A shipyard in Vigo, Spain, in November 2007. The design for the two vessels was developed by the Norwegian naval architect and ship design company Skipsteknisk AS and called ST-254L CD. It is similar to the previously developed design ST-253, which was realized as hull number 701 at the Freire Shipyard as well. This shorter vessel- the Volstad Surveyor was later converted at the Damen shipyard and became the OceanXplorer 1.

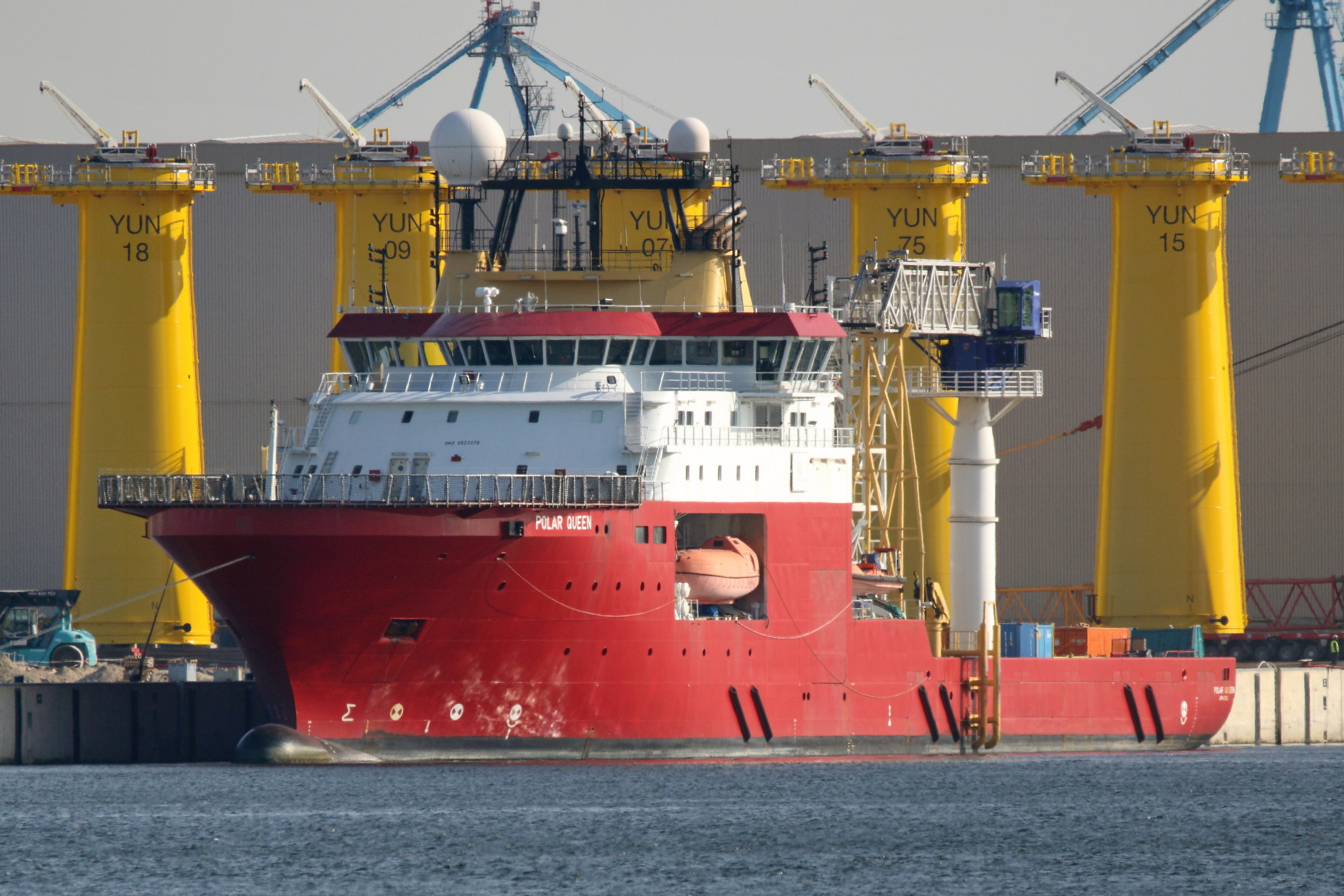
Polar Queen at the SIF-Terminal of the Prinses Arianehaven in Rotterdam, 2020

It was scheduled that the vessels with the hull numbers 702 and 703 would be delivered in February and August 2010 and operated by the two subsidiaries Sea4 I Shipping Ltd. and Sea 4 II Shipping Ltd. The keel for hull number 703 - the later Polar Queen was laid at the 11. December 2008. However, there was a six months delay due to the 2008 financial crisis. In September 2009, it was announced that GC Rieber Shipping had taken over Sea4's subsidiaries for a total of approximately 800 million NOK because at that time, no chartering agreements had been entered into for the newbuildings. Finally the Polar Queen was taken by GC Rieber at the 6. October 2011.

== Service ==
GC Rieber had signed a two-year charter contract with Oceanografía S.A. de C.V. for the Mexican state oil company Pemex, starting Offshore services in the Gulf of Mexico in November 2011. But before the contract expired a Maritime lien arose between GC Rieber and Oceanografía. As a consequence a federal judge in Texas has told a United States Marshal to seize the vessel.

Starting in October 2012, the Polar Queen was chartered by Boa Marine Services Inc. which was based in Houston, Texas, and a subsidiary of the Norwegian BOA Offshore AS. The charter contract was later prolonged beyond April 2015.

From April to December 2017, the ship was used to transport equipment and personnel for the construction of the Nordsee One offshore wind farm in the German North Sea.

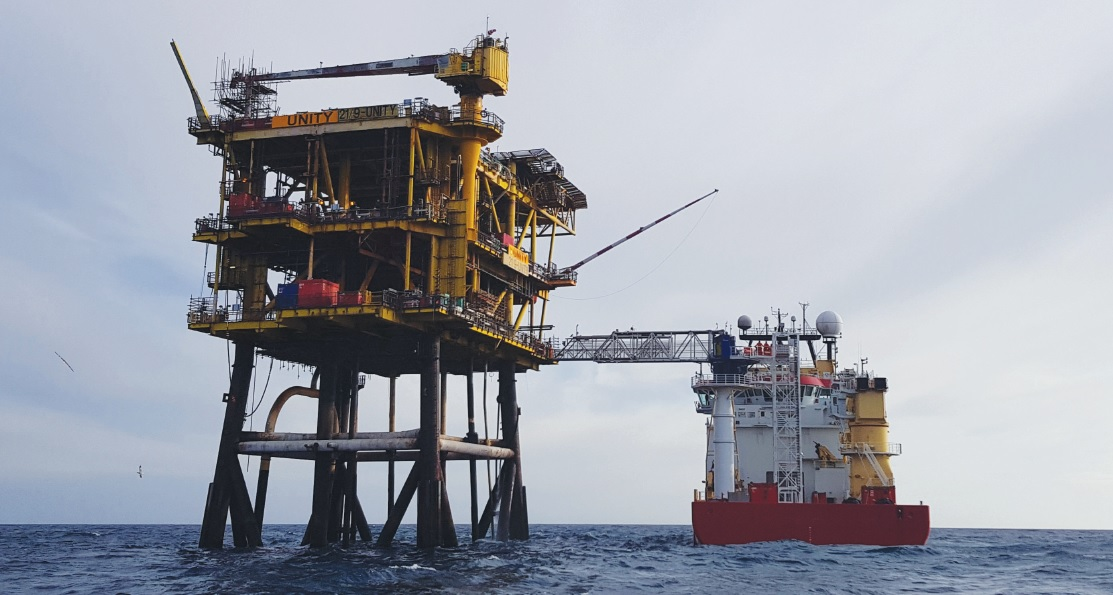
Polar Queen during a Walk to Work service on the riser platform Forties Unity in the Forties Oil Field

From 2018 to 2020, the Polar Queen was used for so called walk-to-work and accommodation services in the North Sea during the summer months. An active heave compensated gangway mounted on board the vessel, allowed technicians and engineers to walk to Normally unmanned installations, e.g. the offshore riser platform Forties Unity in the Forties Oil Field, to perform scheduled maintenance or repairs. When their shift was over, they could walk back to the vessel where they had their accommodation.

== Sale and refit ==
GC Rieber announced the sale of the vessel on 23. February 2021 and the Schmidt Ocean Institute confirmed the purchase one month later. The vessel sailed to Spain and arrived at Vigo in April 2021 to commence the refit.

== See also ==
- ROV SuBastian
- Uruguay Sub200
