= Axoniderma corona =

Scientific classification
- Kingdom: Animalia
- Phylum: Porifera
- Class: Demospongiae
- Order: Poecilosclerida
- Family: Cladorhizidae
- Genus: Axoniderma
- Species: A. corona

Binomial name
- Axoniderma corona (Lehnert, Watking & Stone, 2005)

Synonyms
- Cladorhiza corona Lehnert, Watking & Stone, 2005

Species of demosponge

Axoniderma corona is a species of demosponge in the family Cladorhizidae. It is known from type specimens found near the Aleutian Islands.

== Etymology ==
The generic name is derived from the Ancient Greek ἄξων (áxōn), "wheel", and δέρμα (dérma), "skin". The specific epithet comes from the Latin corona, meaning "crown", in reference to the fact that the species' distal appendages resemble a crown.
