= Axoniderma mexicana =

Scientific classification
- Kingdom: Animalia
- Phylum: Porifera
- Class: Demospongiae
- Order: Poecilosclerida
- Family: Cladorhizidae
- Genus: Axoniderma
- Species: A. mexicana

Binomial name
- Axoniderma mexicana (Lundsten, Reiswig & Austin, 2017)

Synonyms
- Cladorhiza mexicana Lundsten, Reiswig & Austin, 2017

Species of sponge

Axoniderma mexicana is a species of demosponge in the family Cladorhizidae. It is known from type specimens found around Mexico.

== Etymology ==
The generic name, Axoniderma, is derived from the Ancient Greek ἄξων (áxōn), "wheel", and δέρμα (dérma), "skin". The specific epithet, mexicana, refers to Mexico, where the species' holotype was discovered.
