= Axoniderma kensmithi =

Scientific classification
- Kingdom: Animalia
- Phylum: Porifera
- Class: Demospongiae
- Order: Poecilosclerida
- Family: Cladorhizidae
- Genus: Axoniderma
- Species: A. kensmithi

Binomial name
- Axoniderma kensmithi (Lundsten, Reiswig & Austin, 2017)

Synonyms
- Cladorhiza kensmithi Lundsten, Reiswig & Austin, 2017

Species of sponge

Axoniderma kensmithi is a species of demosponge in the family Cladorhizidae. It is known from type specimens found in the Pacific Ocean off the coast of California.

== Etymology ==
The generic name, Axoniderma, is derived from the Ancient Greek ἄξων (áxōn), "wheel", and δέρμα (dérma), "skin". The specific epithet, kensmithi, was given in honor of Dr. Kenneth L. Smith Jr., a marine biologist and ecologist.
