= Cladorhiza caillieti =

Scientific classification
- Kingdom: Animalia
- Phylum: Porifera
- Class: Demospongiae
- Order: Poecilosclerida
- Family: Cladorhizidae
- Genus: Cladorhiza
- Species: C. caillieti

Binomial name
- Cladorhiza caillieti Lundsten, Reiswig & Austin, 2014

Species of sponge

Cladorhiza caillieti is a carnivorous sponge of the family Cladorhizidae described in 2014 from specimens collected from the Juan de Fuca Ridge off the coast of Vancouver Island. It feeds on small crustaceans such as amphipods and copepods. C. caillieti is an elongate, bottlebrush-shaped sponge with filaments projecting from a main stem, and ranges from 7 to 9 cm in height. The specific epithet honors Dr. Gregor M. Cailliet of the Moss Landing Marine Laboratories.
