= Axoniderma hubbsi =

Scientific classification
- Kingdom: Animalia
- Phylum: Porifera
- Class: Demospongiae
- Order: Poecilosclerida
- Family: Cladorhizidae
- Genus: Axoniderma
- Species: A. hubbsi

Binomial name
- Axoniderma hubbsi (Lundsten, Reiswig & Austin, 2017)

Synonyms
- Cladorhiza hubbsi Lundsten, Reiswig & Austin, 2017

Species of demosponge

Axoniderma hubbsi is a species of demosponge in the family Cladorhizidae. It is known from type specimens found in the northeast Pacific Ocean.

== Etymology ==
The generic name is derived from the Ancient Greek ἄξων (áxōn), "wheel", and δέρμα (dérma), "skin". The specific epithet was given in honor of Carl Leavitt Hubbs.
