= Cladorhiza evae =

Scientific classification
- Domain: Eukaryota
- Kingdom: Animalia
- Phylum: Porifera
- Class: Demospongiae
- Order: Poecilosclerida
- Family: Cladorhizidae
- Genus: Cladorhiza
- Species: C. evae

Binomial name
- Cladorhiza evae Lundsten et al., 2014

Species of sponge

Cladorhiza evae is a species of carnivorous sponge native to hydrothermal vents in the Gulf of California.
