= Axoniderma poritea =

Scientific classification
- Kingdom: Animalia
- Phylum: Porifera
- Class: Demospongiae
- Order: Poecilosclerida
- Family: Cladorhizidae
- Genus: Axoniderma
- Species: A. poritea

Binomial name
- Axoniderma poritea (Ekins, Erpenbeck & Hooper, 2020)

Synonyms
- Cladorhiza poritea Ekins, Erpenbeck & Hooper, 2020

Species of sponge

Axoniderma poritea is a species of demosponge in the family Cladorhizidae. It is known from type specimens found on the east coast of Australia.

== Etymology ==
The generic name is derived from the Ancient Greek ἄξων (áxōn), "wheel", and δέρμα (dérma), "skin". The specific epithet was given due to the fact that, when looked at from above, the shape of the species' pseudoamphiasters resemble the corallites of the genus of coral Porites.
