= Axoniderma australis =

Scientific classification
- Kingdom: Animalia
- Phylum: Porifera
- Class: Demospongiae
- Order: Poecilosclerida
- Family: Cladorhizidae
- Genus: Axoniderma
- Species: A. australis

Binomial name
- Axoniderma australis (Ekins, Erpenbeck & Hooper, 2020)

Synonyms
- Cladorhiza australis Ekins, Erpenbeck & Hooper, 2020

Species of sponge

Axoniderma australis is a species of demosponge in the family Cladorhizidae. It is known from type specimens found off the coasts of Tasmania and New South Wales.

== Etymology ==
The generic name is derived from the Ancient Greek ἄξων (áxōn), "wheel", and δέρμα (dérma), "skin". The specific epithet comes from the Latin australis, meaning "southern", in reference to the species' southern distribution.
