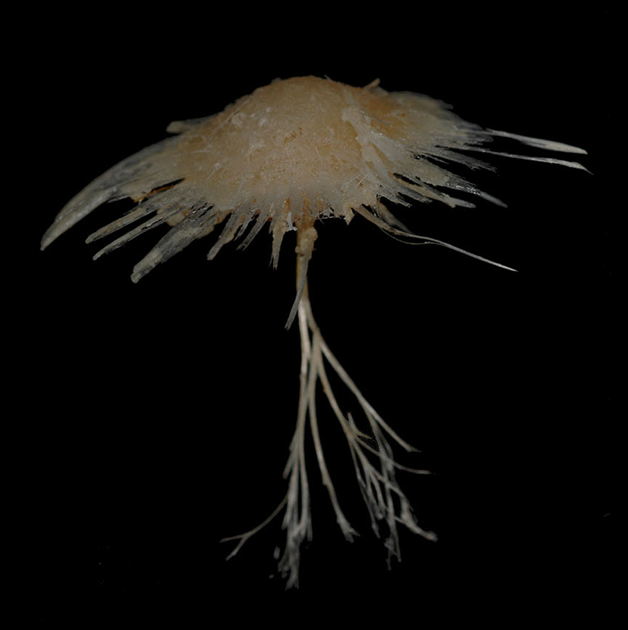
- An undescribed species off the coast of New Zealand

Scientific classification
- Kingdom: Animalia
- Phylum: Porifera
- Class: Demospongiae
- Order: Poecilosclerida
- Family: Cladorhizidae
- Genus: Cladorhiza; Sars, 1872

Species
- See text

Synonyms
- List: Axoniderma Ridley & Dendy, 1887; Cladorrhiza [lapsus]; Exaxinata Laubenfels, 1936; Raoa Laubenfels, 1936; Trochoderma Ridley & Dendy, 1886

= Cladorhiza =

Genus of sponges

Cladorhiza is a genus of carnivorous sponges, comprising around 40 species found in oceans around the world. Cladorhiza is the type genus of the family Cladorhizidae.

== Description ==
Species of Cladorhiza show a wide variety of forms. Some are globular, spherical, or conical, while others grow in tree-like or bush-like shapes. Many species have a narrow stalk or stem. Most species range from 2 to 12 cm in height, with a few attaining heights of 20 to 40 cm.

== Species ==
As of 2014, 40 valid species of Cladorhiza are recognized.

- Cladorhiza abyssicola Sars, 1872
- Cladorhiza acanthoxea Hestetun, Fourt, Vacelet, Boury-Esnault & Rapp, 2015
- Cladorhiza arctica Koltun, 1959
- Cladorhiza bathycrinoides Koltun, 1955
- Cladorhiza caillieti Lundsten, Reiswig & Austin, 2014
- Cladorhiza corallophila Göcke, Hestetun, Uhlir, Freiwald, Beuck & Janussen, 2016
- Cladorhiza corona Lehnert, Watling & Stone, 2005
- Cladorhiza corticocancellata Carter, 1876
- Cladorhiza depressa Kieschnick, 1896
- Cladorhiza diminuta Lopes & Hajdu, 2014
- Cladorhiza ephyrula Lévi, 1964
- Cladorhiza evae Lundsten, Reiswig & Austin, 2014
- Cladorhiza flosabyssi Topsent, 1909
- Cladorhiza fristedti (Lambe, 1900)
- Cladorhiza gelida Lundbeck, 1905
- Cladorhiza grimaldii Topsent, 1909
- Cladorhiza hubbsi Lundsten, Reiswig & Austin, 2017
- Cladorhiza iniquidentata Lundbeck, 1905
- Cladorhiza inversa Ridley & Dendy, 1886
- Cladorhiza kenchingtonae Hestetun, Tompkins-Macdonald & Rapp, 2017
- Cladorhiza kensmithi Lundsten, Reiswig & Austin, 2017
- Cladorhiza linearis Ridley & Dendy, 1886
- Cladorhiza longipinna Ridley & Dendy, 1886
- Cladorhiza mani Koltun, 1964
- Cladorhiza methanophila Vacelet & Boury-Esnault, 2002
- Cladorhiza mexicana Lundsten, Reiswig & Austin, 2017
- Cladorhiza microchela Lévi, 1964
- Cladorhiza mirabilis (Ridley & Dendy, 1886)
- Cladorhiza moruliformis Ridley & Dendy, 1886
- Cladorhiza nematophora Lévi, 1964
- Cladorhiza nicoleae Castello-Branco, Hestetun, Rapp & Hajdu, 2016
- Cladorhiza oxeata Lundbeck, 1905
- Cladorhiza penniformis Göcke & Janussen, 2013
- Cladorhiza pentacrinus Dendy, 1887
- Cladorhiza pteron Reiswig & Lee, 2007
- Cladorhiza rectangularis Ridley & Dendy, 1887
- Cladorhiza scanlonae Goodwin, Berman, Downey & Hendry, 2017
- Cladorhiza schistochela Lévi, 1993
- Cladorhiza segonzaci Vacelet, 2006
- Cladorhiza septemdentalis Koltun, 1970
- Cladorhiza similis Ridley & Dendy, 1886
- Cladorhiza tenuisigma Lundbeck, 1905
- Cladorhiza thomsoni Topsent, 1909
- Cladorhiza tridentata Ridley & Dendy, 1886
