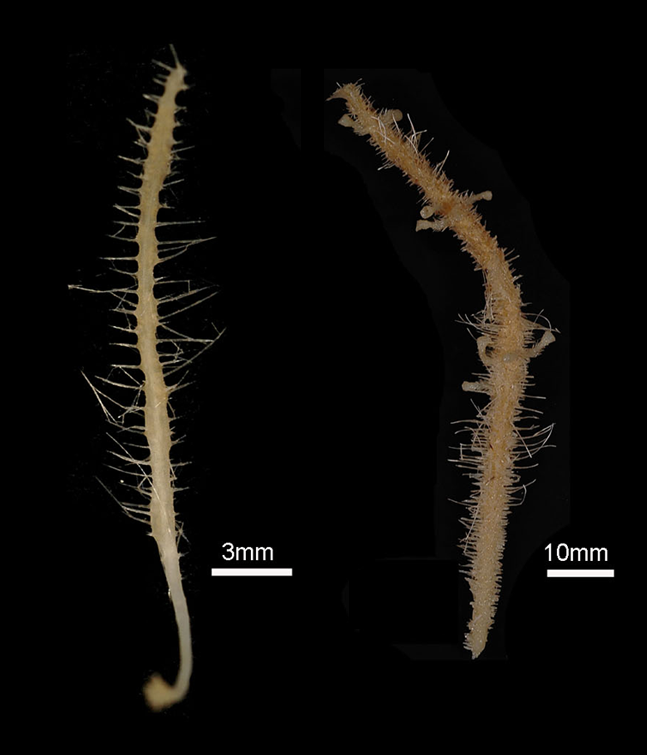
- Two undescribed species of Abyssocladia

Scientific classification
- Kingdom: Animalia
- Phylum: Porifera
- Class: Demospongiae
- Order: Poecilosclerida
- Family: Cladorhizidae
- Genus: Abyssocladia; Lévi, 1964

= Abyssocladia =

Genus of sponges

Abyssocladia is a genus of the family Cladorhizidae, a family of carnivorous sponges. It is made up of at least 39 species found in oceans all over the world.

== Description ==
This genus is characterized by its unique teeth-like structures called abyssochelae, although they are not present in every species. Types of microscleres could also include cleistochelae, arcute chelae, and/or sigmacistras. Their general morphology can be divided into two groups. The first group has a long peduncle and round top. The second group is feather-like with a shorter peduncle. Both groups have straight spicules and are covered in a layer of soft tissue with sticky microstrongyles protruding perpendicularly from the body, used to capture prey. Sizes of these organisms can vary from a few millimeters to several centimeters tall and just a few millimeters wide. Their thin skeleton and soft tissue can make these sponges very fragile.

== Feeding ==
Most carnivorous sponges lack an aquiferous system, meaning they cannot filter water to get their food. Instead, they have hook-like microscleres to capture prey, like small crustaceans. These structures entangle prey and amoebocytes in the sponge surround the prey, bringing it inside to be consumed. Digestion of its prey can take up to several days. This unusual process of feeding was likely adapted because it is easier for the organism to get more nutrients in one meal as compared to filter feeding in the deep sea.

== Distribution ==
In the deep sea, resources are sparse, so organisms tend to have clustered distribution. These carnivorous sponges are usually found around nutrient hot spots like seamounts, and oceanic ridges. While most species in Abyssocladia have been found at depths over 3,000 metres (9,800 ft), a few have been found in shallower waters around 1,000 m (3,300 ft). One species, A. antarctica, was found at 220 m (720 ft), in the Weddell Sea off the coast of Antarctica. In addition to the Weddell Sea, Abyssocladia have been found in many ocean basins all over the world, including the Pacific, Atlantic, and Indian oceans.

== Species ==
About 39 species are currently recognized:

- Abyssocladia annae Ekins, Erpenbeck & Hooper, 2020
- Abyssocladia antarctica Buskowiak & Janussen, 2021
- Abyssocladia atlantica Lopes & Hajdu, 2014
- Abyssocladia boletiphora Hestetun, Rapp & Xavier, 2017
- Abyssocladia bruuni Lévi, 1964
- Abyssocladia carcharias Kelly & Vacelet, 2011
- Abyssocladia claviformis Koltun, 1970
- Abyssocladia corniculiphora Hestetun, Rapp & Xavier, 2017
- Abyssocladia desmophora Hooper & Lévi, 1989
- Abyssocladia diegoramirezensis Lopes, Bravo & Hajdu, 2011
- Abyssocladia dominalba Vacelet, 2006
- Abyssocladia escheri Ekins, Erpenbeck & Hooper, 2020
- Abyssocladia falkor Elkins & Hooper, 2023
- Abyssocladia faranauti Hestetun, Fourt, Vacelet, Boury-Esnault & Rapp, 2015
- Abyssocladia flagrum Lehnert, Stone & Heimler, 2006
- Abyssocladia fryerae Hestetun, Rapp & Pomponi, 2019
- Abyssocladia gliscofila Ekins, Erpenbeck & Hooper, 2020
- Abyssocladia hemiradiata Hestetun, Rapp & Xavier, 2017
- Abyssocladia huitzilopochtli Vacelet, 2006
- Abyssocladia inflata Vacelet, 2006
- Abyssocladia kanaconi Vacelet, 2020
- Abyssocladia kellyae Hestetun, Rapp & Pomponi, 2019
- Abyssocladia koltuni Ereskovsky & Willenz, 2007
- Abyssocladia lakwollii Vacelet & Kelly, 2014
- Abyssocladia leverhulmei Goodwin, Berman, Downey & Hendry, 2017
- Abyssocladia marianensis Hestetun, Rapp & Pomponi, 2019
- Abyssocladia microstrongylata Vacelet, 2020
- Abyssocladia mucronata Vacelet, 2020
- Abyssocladia myojinensis Ise & Vacelet, 2010
- Abyssocladia natsushimae Ise & Vacelet, 2010
- Abyssocladia naudur Vacelet, 2006
- Abyssocladia oxeata Koltun, 1970
- Abyssocladia oxyasters Ekins, Erpenbeck, Goudie & Hooper, 2020
- Abyssocladia polycephalus Hestetun, Pomponi & Rapp, 2016
- Abyssocladia stegosaurensis Hestetun, Rapp & Pomponi, 2019
- Abyssocladia symmetrica Ridley & Dendy, 1886
- Abyssocladia tecta Hestetun, Fourt, Vacelet, Boury-Esnault & Rapp, 2015
- Abyssocladia umbellata Lopes, Bravo & Hajdu, 2011
- Abyssocladia vaceleti Ríos & Cristobo, 2018
- Abyssocladia villosa Hestetun, Rapp & Pomponi, 2019
