= Asbestopluma =

Scientific classification
- Kingdom: Animalia
- Phylum: Porifera
- Class: Demospongiae
- Order: Poecilosclerida
- Family: Cladorhizidae
- Genus: Asbestopluma; Topsent, 1901

Genus of sponges

Asbestopluma is a genus of sponges belonging to the family Cladorhizidae.

The genus has cosmopolitan distribution. They are typically found in deep water, however it is possible to find them in shallow water caves, as some have been observed in the Trois Pépés cave at La Ciotat (a commune in Marseille, France). The sponge, along with the rest of the Cladorhizidae family is carnivorous, often being found in deep sea waters, in the Arctic and the Northwest Atlantic ocean.

Species:

- Asbestopluma agglutinans Vacelet, 2006
- Asbestopluma anisoplacochela Kelly & Vacelet, 2011
- Asbestopluma belgicae (Topsent, 1901)
