= Axoniderma =

Scientific classification
- Kingdom: Animalia
- Phylum: Porifera
- Class: Demospongiae
- Order: Poecilosclerida
- Family: Cladorhizidae
- Genus: Axoniderma; Ridley & Dendy, 1886

Species
- Axoniderma australis (Ekins, Erpenbeck & Hooper, 2020); Axoniderma corona (Lehnert, Watking & Stone, 2005); Axoniderma hubbsi (Lundsten, Reiswig & Austin, 2017); Axoniderma kensmithi (Lundsten, Reiswig & Austin, 2017); Axoniderma longipinna (Ridley & Dendy, 1886); Axoniderma mexicana (Lundsten, Reiswig & Austin, 2017); Axoniderma mirabile (Ridley & Dendy, 1886); Axoniderma poritea (Ekins, Erpenbeck & Hooper, 2020); Axoniderma similis (Ridley & Dendy, 1886)

Synonyms
- Trochoderma Ridley & Dendy, 1886

Genus of sponges

Axoniderma is a genus of carnivorous demosponges in the family Cladorhizidae.

== Taxonomy ==
The genus was first described by Stuart Oliver Ridley and Arthur Dendy in 1886 under the name Trochoderma, based on the type species Trochoderma mirabile. The name was derived from the Ancient Greek words τροχός (trokhós), "wheel", and δέρμα (dérma), "skin". However, upon the discovery that the generic name Trochoderma was already in use, as a genus of sea cucumbers, the name Axoniderma was proposed, instead utilizing another Ancient Greek word for "wheel", ἄξων (áxōn), thus making the type species Axoniderma mirabile.

== Species ==
The World Register of Marine Species includes the following species:

- Axoniderma australis (Ekins, Erpenbeck & Hooper, 2020)
- Axoniderma corona (Lehnert, Watking & Stone, 2005)
- Axoniderma hubbsi (Lundsten, Reiswig & Austin, 2017)
- Axoniderma kensmithi (Lundsten, Reiswig & Austin, 2017)
- Axoniderma longipinna (Ridley & Dendy, 1886)
- Axoniderma mexicana (Lundsten, Reiswig & Austin, 2017)
- Axoniderma mirabile (Ridley & Dendy, 1886)
- Axoniderma poritea (Ekins, Erpenbeck & Hooper, 2020)
- Axoniderma similis (Ridley & Dendy, 1886)
