= Uruguay Sub200 =

Uruguayan scientific expedition

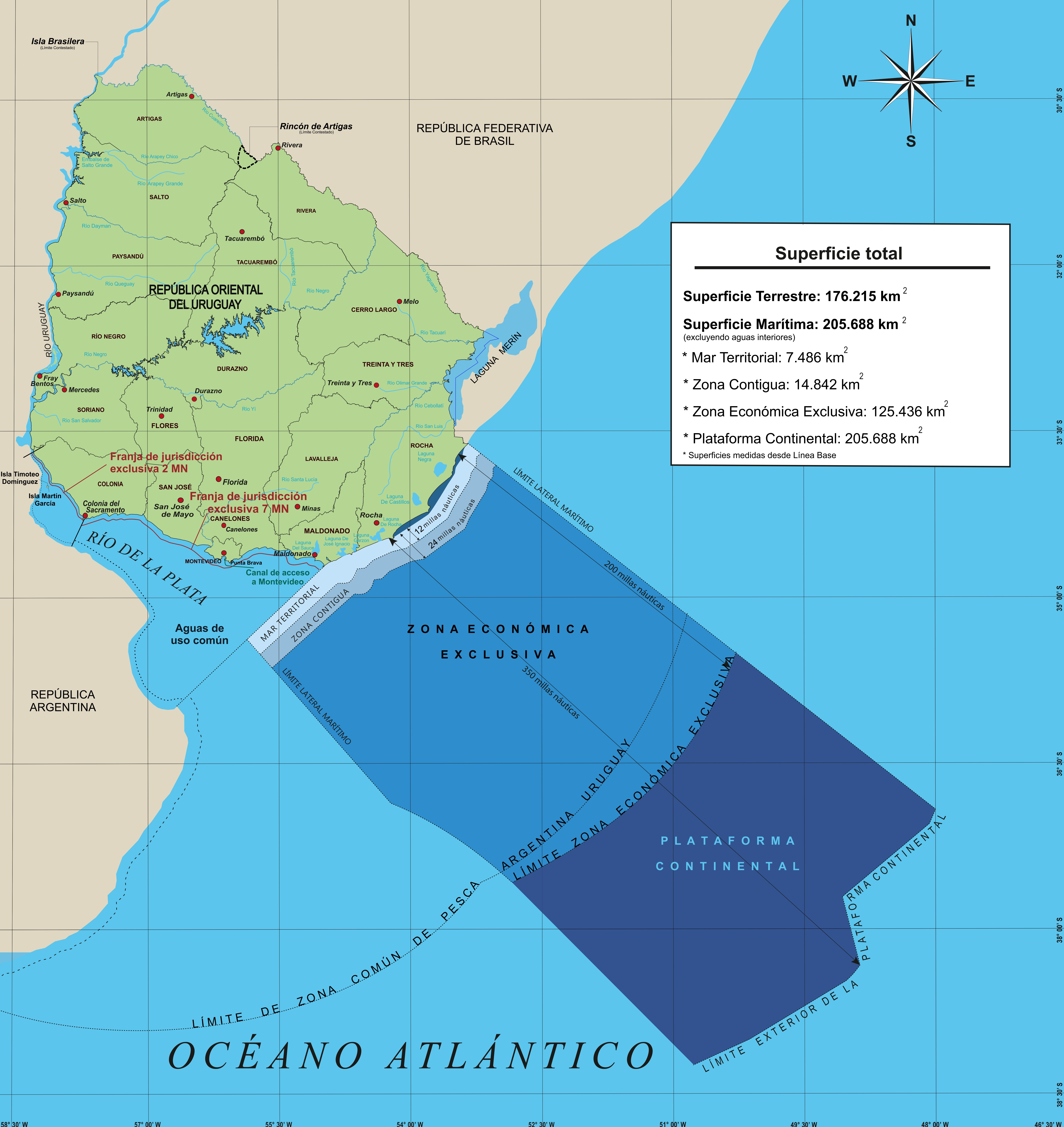
Uruguayan maritime space map.

The Uruguay Sub200 expedition was a scientific expedition deployed with the aim of exploring the bathypelagic zone of the Uruguayan continental margin and collecting specimens for the National Museum of Natural History of Uruguay (acronym MNHN).

== Overview ==
The project was conceived by Uruguayan scientists Alvar Carranza (PhD in biodiversity and conservation) and Leticia Burone (PhD in marine geology), who presented it to the Schmidt Ocean Institute, after which it was selected by this institution from among several international proposals.

The expedition was led by the University of the Republic aboard the oceanographic vessel RV Falkor Too of the Schmidt Ocean Institute (SOI). It was the first effort to systematically collect samples and images of organisms living in the depths of Uruguayan maritime space. The objective was to investigate seven submarine canyons, including those of Montevideo, Piriápolis, José Ignacio, Cabo Polonio, and also 27 submarine elevations with mesophotic coral reefs.

The campaign began on 22 August 2025 with the aim of exploring, until 19 September, the strip of the Uruguayan continental margin between 200 and 4,200 metres deep, from the border with Brazil in the north to the border with Argentina in the south. This is the most comprehensive study of Uruguay's continental shelf and deep ocean ecosystems to date.

== Species ==
Among the species observed are: Scyliorhinus, rays, brittle stars, and hermit crabs. A dark-belly skate was recorded for the first time in Uruguay.
