= Gregor Cailliet =

American scientist

Gregor Michel Cailliet
- Born: 1943 ?
- Scientific career
- Institutions: Moss Landing Marine Laboratories, part of The California State University
- Website: ichthyology.mlml.calstate.edu/Cailliet

Gregor Michel Cailliet is an American scientist who studies the ecology of marine fishes. He is professor emeritus at Moss Landing Marine Laboratories, part of The California State University, having officially retired in 2009.

== Education and career ==
Cailliet received a B.A. and Ph.D. from University of California at Santa Barbara. He is the author of the books Fishes: A field and laboratory manual on their structure, identification, and natural history (ISBN 0534055567) and Everyman's Guide to Ecological Living (New York, Macmillan: 1971), as well as many journal articles.

Cladorhiza caillieti, a carnivorous sponge first described in 2014, is named after him.
