= Gaia Blu =

Research vessel of the Italian National Research Council

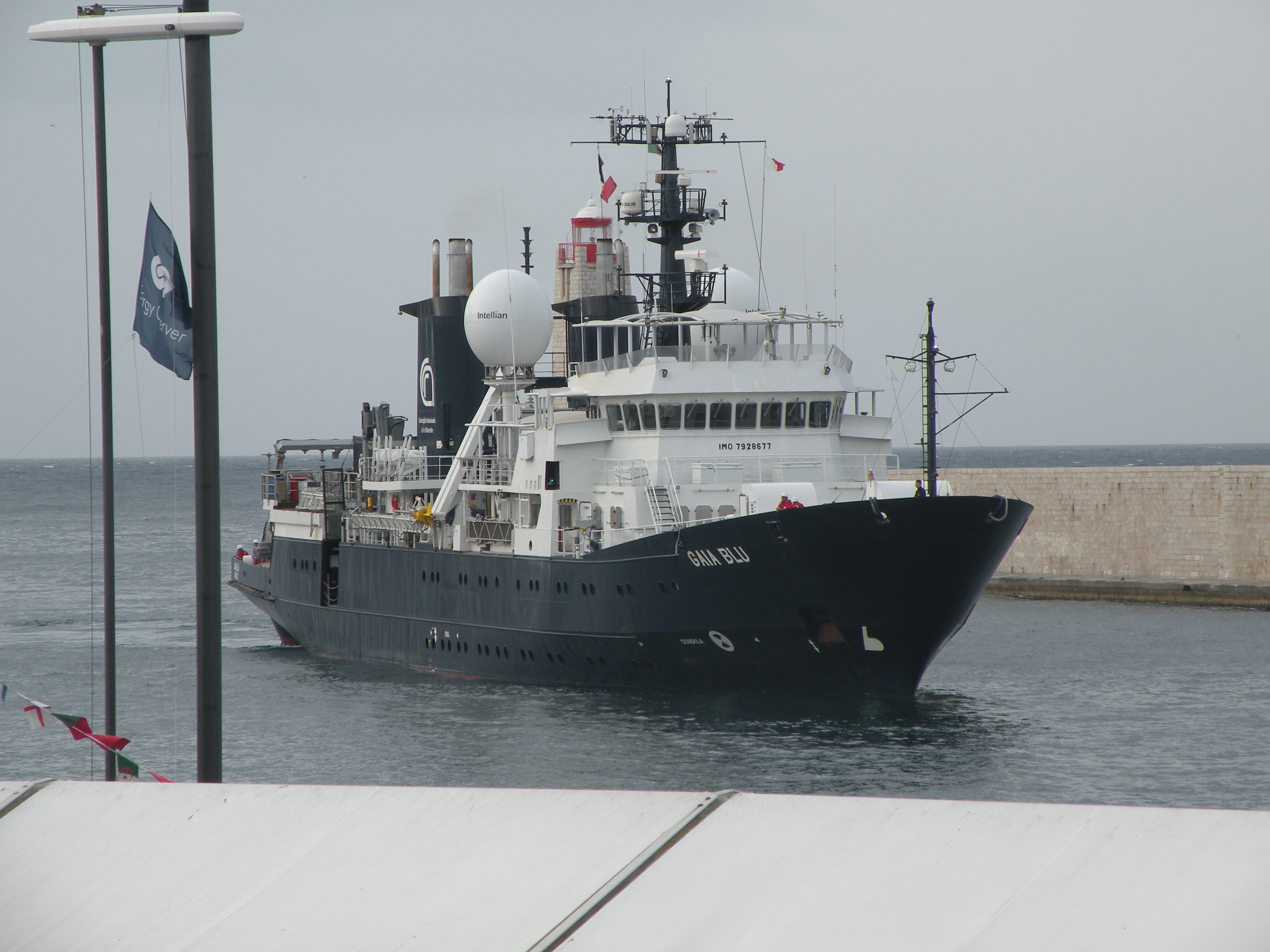
- Gaia Blu in 2025

History

Italy
- Name: Gaia Blu; Seefalke (Sea Hawk) (until July 2009); Falkor (until 2022)
- Operator: Consiglio Nazionale delle Ricerche, CNR
- Port of registry: Italy; Hamburg (until 2009); George Town, Cayman Islands (until 2022)
- Builder: Orenstein & Koppel AG, Lübeck, Germany
- Cost: $94 million (refit/conversion)
- Yard number: 760
- Launched: 22 December 1980
- Completed: 8 September 1981
- Refit: 2010-2012
- Identification: IMO number: 7928677; MMSI number: 247442600; Call sign: ICDA
- Status: in service

General characteristics
- Tonnage: 2,088 GT; 627 NT
- Displacement: 2,260 m³
- Length: 82.9 metres (272 ft)
- Beam: 13 metres (43 ft)
- Draft: 4.8 metres (16 ft)
- Depth: 6.67 metres (21.9 ft)
- Speed: 12 kn (cruising); 19.8 kn (max)
- Range: 13,000 nm
- Endurance: 40 days
- Capacity: 18 scientists
- Crew: 19+2 technicians
- Aviation facilities: 12.6 m diameter helideck.; No storage or refueling

Gaia Blu (formerly RV Falkor) is an oceanographic research vessel operated by the National Research Council of Italy. It concluded its first scientific expedition under this name on the 9th of December 2023.

== History ==
Gaia Blu was originally a fishery protection vessel named Seefalke ("Sea Falcon") built in 1981 in Lübeck, Germany. She was retrofitted into an oceanographic research vessel at Peters Werft shipyard in Wewelsfleth, Germany from 2009 to early 2012. The retrofitted vessel was renamed R/V Falkor, after the Luckdragon in the fantasy novel The Neverending Story. The ship became fully operational in 2013 and conducted a full year of scientific expeditions. In 2016, ROV SuBastian was added to Falkor, adding to her technological capabilities and scientific resources.

As a Schmidt Ocean Institute vessel, ship time aboard was made freely available to researchers once they had undergone an application, peer review process, and their proposal had been accepted. One condition for using the Falkor was that research findings and data from all expeditions were made publicly available. Researchers aboard Falkor received expert shipboard support, use of scientific equipment, as well as robotic and computational resources. RV Falkor was adaptable and could facilitate new technologies and external resources as required for each science expedition. The Schmidt Ocean Institute announced a change of ownership of the vessel on 14 March 2022. The vessel was donated to the Italian National Research Council and renamed to Gaia Blu.

== Facilities ==
Gaia Blu has dynamic positioning capabilities which allow it to maintain position when required to deploy scientific instruments. Gaia Blu's mapping capabilities include shallow and deep-water multibeam echo sounders and subsea acoustic positioning system for acoustic research and seafloor mapping. The research vessel's mapping capabilities have been used to map over a million square kilometers of the seafloor, including the discovery of 14 new underwater features. The mapping data collected is shared as part of the Nippon Foundation-GEBCO Seabed 2030 Project with aims to achieve complete seafloor coverage by 2030.

Gaia Blu has two workboats, a high-performance computing system, and real-time water temperature, pH, fluorescence, and salinity measurement capabilities.

=== Control room ===
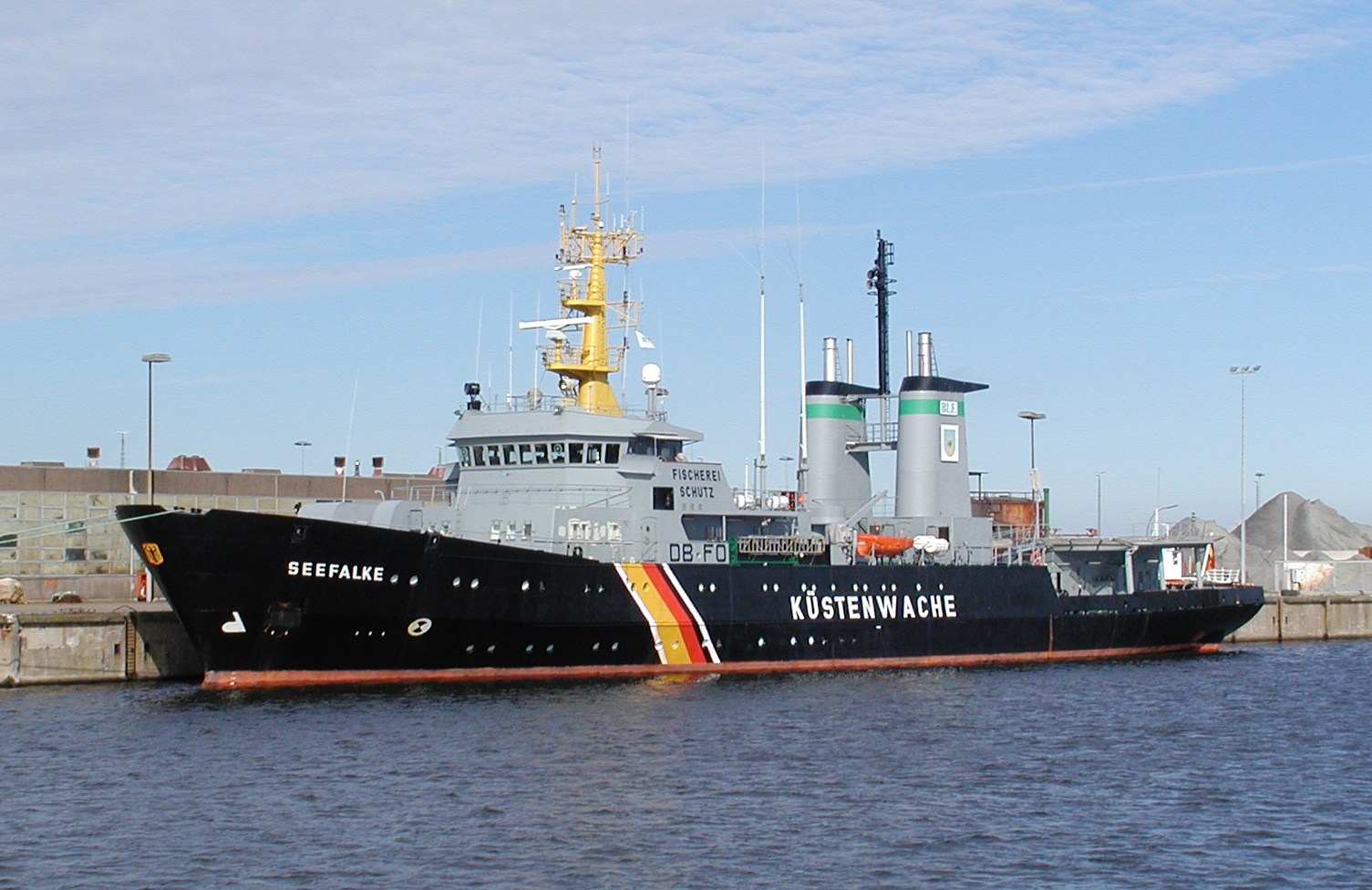
RV Falkor in 2006

The control room is dedicated to operating the underwater robots (ROV/AUV) as well as electronic instrumentation interaction, sonar control, and seafloor mapping. The primary work area has four captain's chairs with over 20 customizable monitors which can be configured to control one or more systems at a time. Two additional desks and monitors provide workspace and/or act as a multibeam editing workstation.

=== Working decks ===
Gaia Blu has side and aft working for decks. The working decks are designed to deploy ROV SuBastian, light packages, profilers, an ROV (SAAB Sea Eye Falcon), two elevator and lander platforms rated to 11,000 meters, equipment brought on board by the science team, and the CTD system with either the J-frame or A-frame cranes and winch system. A staging bay is used to securely mount additional equipment. The aft deck is additionally equipped with 500 kW of unregulated electrical power, hot and cold freshwater outlets, incubator seawater outlets, and compressed air outlets.

=== Wet and dry labs ===
Gaia Blu has both wet and dry laboratories located immediately to the aft deck for the effective processing and study of samples. Both labs include features to stabilize instruments and enable lab work at sea with customizable screens running a variety of data feeds. The 32 square-meter wet lab is equipped with -80 °C, -30 °C, and +4 °C freezers, flammable gas piping, compressed air outlets, a fume hood, as well taps for freshwater and incubated and uncontaminated saltwater. The dry lab is directly connected to the control room allowing researchers to work alongside the control room.

=== Internet connectivity ===
Gaia Blu maintains an internet connection using a Seatel 97 series marine stabilized antenna system on C Band, the original frequency allocation for communications satellites. Schmidt Ocean Institute has set up over 15 Virtual Local Area Networks (VLAN) to distribute bandwidth to different devices. The VLAN system maximizes the speed and efficiency of applications over the network with traffic-shaping/ WAN optimization technologies, enabling automatic report delivery and real-time monitoring. Outreach operations are supported by a private, secure VPN tunnel between ship and shore and live acquisition to Schmidt Ocean Institute website and science sensors in real-time.
