= ROV SuBastian =

Remotely operated underwater vehicle owned by the Schmidt Ocean Institute

The ROV SuBastian is a remotely operated underwater vehicle owned and operated by the Schmidt Ocean Institute from its research vessel RV Falkor (too) for scientific exploration of the deep sea. It can reach depths up to 4,500m (2.8 miles). The tethered robot has an array of scientific capability which includes:

- Deploying and recovering scientific equipment
- Photomosaicing
- Sample collection
- Seawater characterization
- Seafloor mapping
- 4k High-resolution video

ROV SuBastian is an adaptable system and additional sensors and scientific instruments can be mounted onto the ROV based on a science party's specific research goals.

== History ==
ROV SuBastian was named after the character Bastian from the German fantasy novel The Neverending Story combined with “sub,” as the vehicle is used subsurface. ROV SuBastian operates solely from R/V Falkor.

ROV SuBastian was specifically designed and constructed for scientific research in 2015 by a California-based team of engineers. The design and construction process took approximately 18 months. SuBastian was tank tested at the Monterey Bay Aquarium Research Institute prior to its first deep sea launch. The inaugural dive occurred in 2016 in the deep sea off Guam. As of 2020, ROV SuBastian has completed over 400 dives around the globe, enabling researcher's access to remote regions and depths. Researchers utilizing ROV SuBastian have discovered new species, seafloor features, and advanced scientific exploration of the global ocean.

In March 2025, ROV SuBastian was used to film the first footage of a live colossal squid in its natural environment. A juvenile colossal squid, with a size of about 30 cm, was filmed at a depth of 600 meters near the South Sandwich Islands in the Atlantic Ocean.

== Specifications ==
ROV SuBastian weighs 3,200kg and is 2.7m x 1.8m x 1.8m, roughly the same size as a subcompact car. The vehicle is fitted with syntactic foam, allowing it to be neutrally buoyant while diving. SuBastian moves using five thrusters; one thruster moves it sideways, two move it forward and back, and another two are used for vertical movement. It is tethered to Falkor with a highly flexible and robust umbilical cable, which provides electrical and optical signals between the ship and ROV. The umbilical uses a cantilever system to avoid entanglement with propellers. ROV SuBastian transits at a speed of 0.5 – 3 knots, depending on depth and currents. Once deployed, ROV SuBastian is controlled by at least two pilots aboard the ship. The dive length depends on objective, depth, and weather. The average dive time is around 8 hours, but there are no technical limits on how long an ROV can stay down.
