= Schmidt Ocean Institute =

Non-profit foundation

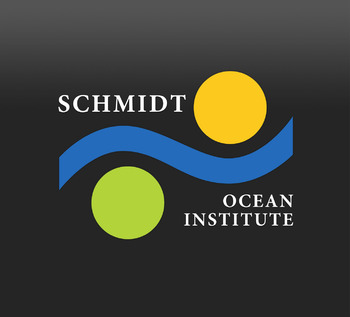
- Formation: 2009 (17 years ago)
- Founder: Eric Schmidt; Wendy Schmidt
- Type: 501(c)(3) tax exempt private foundation
- Tax ID no.: 26-4562328
- Location: Palo Alto, California, United States of America
- Affiliations: The Schmidt Family Foundation; Schmidt Sciences; 11th Hour Racing; Remain
- Website: Schmidt Ocean Institute

Schmidt Ocean Institute (SOI) is a 501(c)(3) non-profit operating foundation established in March 2009 by Eric Schmidt and Wendy Schmidt. The Institute's goal is to advance innovative oceanographic research and discovery through technological advancement, collaborative research, outreach and education, and open sharing of information. SOI supports oceanographic research by providing collaborators with free ship time aboard their research vessel RV Falkor (too) and expert technical shipboard support. Collaborating researchers and institutions utilizing Falkor commit to openly share and communicate the outcomes of their research, including raw observations and data. Research proposals are reviewed through a peer-reviewed process and assessed based on their potential for technological innovation, oceanographic research, and overall impact. Since its inception in 2009, SOI has supported over 60 expeditions all around the globe.

== Research vessels ==
The Schmidt Ocean Institute has operated three research vessels, R/V Lone Ranger (later renamed Sea Ranger), R/V Falkor and R/V Falkor (too). The Lone Ranger, a 255-foot former ocean tug, was donated to the Institute by Peter B. Lewis in 2009 and was operated by the Institute to support research in Bermuda and the Bahamas but has since been sold into private ownership as the Sea Ranger, a research vessel for Witherby Publishing Group.

In 2012 the Schmidt Ocean Institute completed the retrofit of a former German Fisheries protection vessel into a state-of-the-art oceanographic research vessel. The newly retrofitted vessel was renamed R/V Falkor after the luckdragon from The Neverending Story. R/V Falkor became fully operational for scientific use in 2013 following a year of sea trials. Since then, Falkor has hosted numerous international science teams and institutes, successfully supporting oceanographic research. In 2015, R/V Falkor became the first oceanographic research vessel with a high-performance computing system expanding data storage and processing capabilities.

In 2023 the Schmidt Ocean Institute completed the retrofit of a multi-role offshore support vessel into a 110 m-long (360 ft) state-of-the-art mobile research facility named RV Falkor (too). The RV Falkor (too) has 8 laboratories, three multibeam echosounder arrays, seven over-the-side launch and recovery handling systems for science equipment and one of the largest cranes on a research vessel.

== Expeditions and notable discoveries ==
Schmidt Ocean Institute research is focused on oceanographic exploration, seafloor mapping, and marine technology innovation. Researchers aboard R/V Falkor have discovered many new species, as well as new seafloor features and environments utilizing the ships onboard mapping technologies and ROV SuBastian.

Notable accomplishments include the discovery of the world’s deepest known living fish, among several new species in the Mariana Trench. In March 2020, ROV SuBastian recorded footage of a Siphonophore off the coast of Australia that is likely the longest animal on Earth.

R/V Falkor’s advanced multibeam mapping capabilities enabled the discovery of 14 new underwater features and mapped over one million square kilometers of the seafloor.

Important discoveries have been made in hydrothermal vent and cold seep environments. During the Microbial Mysteries expedition, researchers discovered large venting mineral towers that reach up to 23 meters in height featuring volcanic flanges that create the illusion of looking at a mirror when observing the superheated hydrothermal fluids beneath them. Expeditions on R/V Falkor have more than doubled the number of known hydrothermal vent sites in the Mariana Back-arc region and discovered a recently erupted underwater lava field. In 2016, an Unmanned Aerial Vehicle (UAV) with scientific instruments completed the first-ever successful mission launched from a ship without the help of a launching system.

SOI testified before the United States House of Representatives Committee on Science, Space, and Technology, Environment Subcommittee in 2019 to discuss ocean exploration including how it benefits society and is important to assess changes in ocean conditions.

In 2020, the SOI’s seafloor mapping technology aboard R/V Falkor discovered the largest peaked coral reef at the Great Barrier Reef reaching a height of more than 1,640 feet tall, the first of its kind discovered in more than 120 years.

In January 2025, after the iceberg A-84 broke away from the George VI Ice Shelf, the team aboard SOI’s R/V Falkor (too) working in the Bellingshausen Sea modified their research plans to study the newly exposed seafloor.

Rearchers of the Schmidt Ocean Institute using ROV SuBastian filmed the first footage in history of an alive colossal squid in March 2025. It was a juvenile colossal squid with a size of about 30 cm (12 in), filmed at a depth of about 600 meters near the South Sandwich Islands in the Atlantic Ocean.

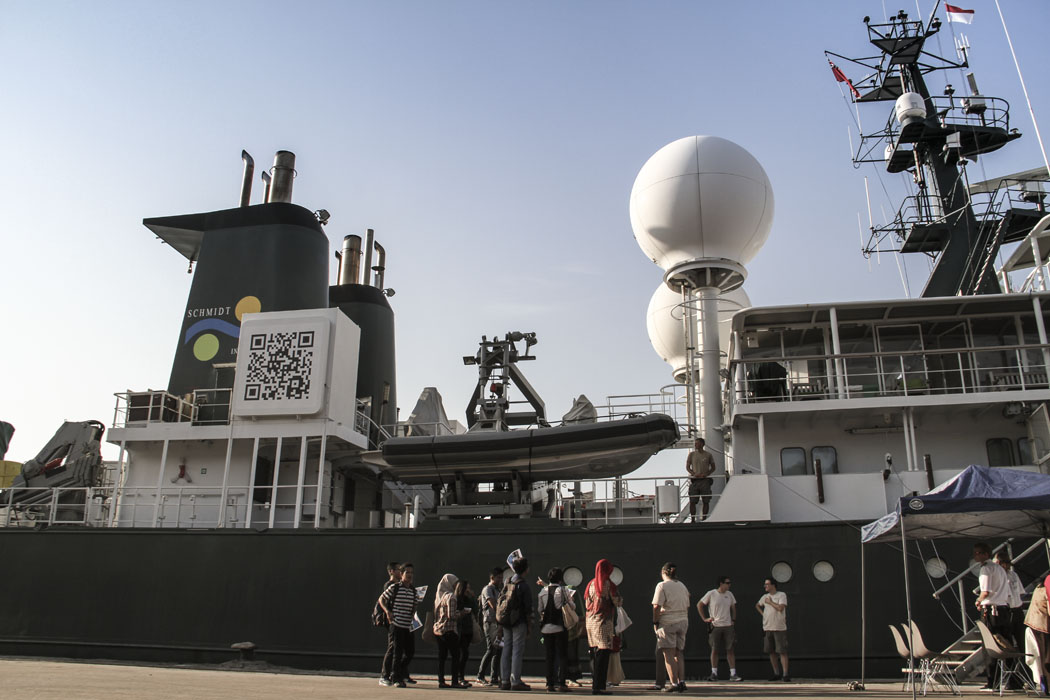
R/V Falkor

== Outreach ==
Schmidt Ocean Institute engages in a number of outreach and education activities in order to promote the research conducted aboard the ship. Some of SOI's outreach activities include public ship tours, ship-to-shore connections, art exhibits, weekly blog posts, and social media updates. In addition, all ROV dives are live-streamed for public viewing. SOI footage is available under a CC-NC license.

=== Artist-at-Sea and Student Opportunities ===
SOI provides opportunities for artists and student oceanographers to take part in research expeditions through Student Opportunities and Artist-at-Sea programs. Artist-at-Sea participants collaborate with the science team to create pieces inspired by oceanographic research. Pieces from the Artist-at-Sea program have been displayed around the world in a traveling exhibit. The Student Opportunities program provides undergraduate and graduate students a chance to take part in seagoing scientific research.
