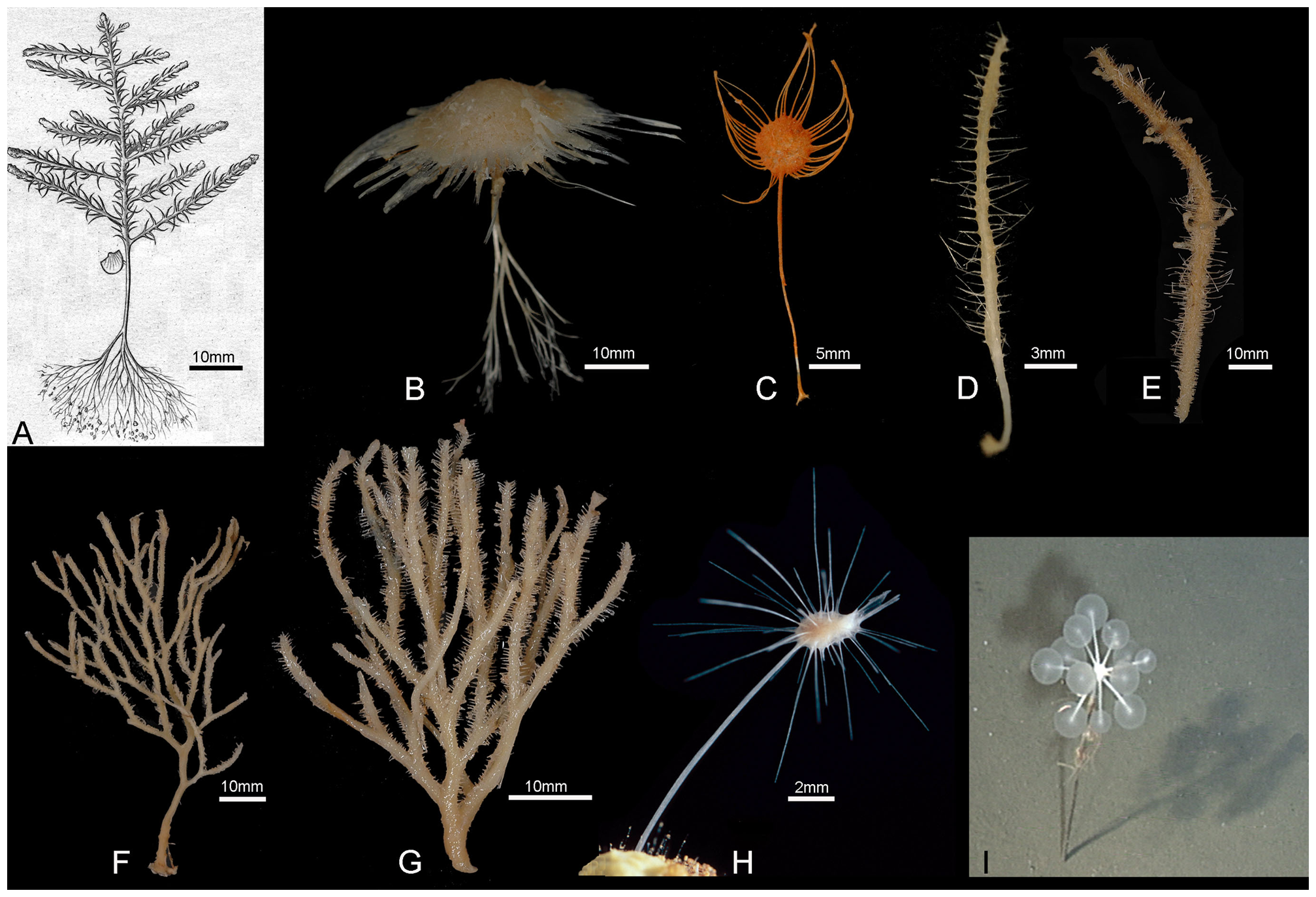
- Representatives of the diversity of forms in Cladorhizidae

Scientific classification
- Kingdom: Animalia
- Phylum: Porifera
- Class: Demospongiae
- Order: Poecilosclerida
- Family: Cladorhizidae; Dendy, 1922

Genera
- See text

= Cladorhizidae =

Family of sponges

Cladorhizidae is a family of carnivorous demosponges. The sponges are carnivorous and prey on crustaceans and other small animals.

A species of this family was found to be bioluminescent.

== Genera ==
The World Register of Marine Species includes the following genera:

- Abyssocladia Lévi, 1964
- Abyssosdiskos Ekins, Erpenbeck, Goudie & Hooper, 2020
- Asbestopluma Topsent, 1901
- Axoniderma Ridley & Dendy, 1886
- Bathytentacular Ekins, Erpenbeck, Goudie & Hooper, 2020
- Cercicladia Rios, Kelly & Vacelet, 2011
- Chondrocladia Thomson, 1873
- Cladorhiza Sars, 1872
- Euchelipluma Topsent, 1909
- Koltunicladia Hestetun, Vacelet, Boury-Esnault, Borchiellini, Kelly, Rios, Cristobo & Rapp, 2016
- Lollipocladia Vacelet, 2008
- Lycopodina Lundbeck, 1905
- Nullarbora Ekins, Erpenbeck, Goudie & Hooper, 2020
